= Midrash Shmuel (aggadah) =

Aggadic midrash on the Books of Samuel

Midrash Samuel (Hebrew: מדרש שמואל) is an aggadic midrash on the books of Samuel.

== Names ==
It is first quoted by Rashi, who calls it by several names: "Midrash Shmuel", "Aggadat Midrash Shmuel", "Aggadah deShmuel", and "Midrash 'Et la-'Asot la-Adonai" - the last name probably derived from Psalms 119:126, with which the midrash begins. It is also called "Aggadat Shmu'el". The name "Shocher Tov" has been erroneously given to it, the error is because in the Venice edition of 1546 the midrash was printed together with Midrash Tehillim, whose title "Shocher Tov" was taken to refer to both works.

== Contents of the midrash ==
The midrash is divided into 32 chapters. Chapters 1-24 cover I Samuel, and chapters 25-32 cover II Samuel.

The midrash contains aggadic interpretations and homilies on the books of Samuel, each homily being prefaced and introduced by a verse taken from some other book of the Bible. It resembles most of the other aggadic midrashim in diction and in style; in fact, it is a collection of teachings found in such midrashim and referring to the books of Samuel. The editor arranged the teachings in the sequence of the Scripture passages to which they refer. The midrash, however, does not entirely cover the Biblical books; but as it contains all the passages quoted from it by other authorities, it may be assumed that (with two exceptions added by later copyists: chapter 4:1 and chapter 32:3 et seq.) it never contained any more than it does now, and that its present form is that into which it was cast by its compiler.

The author has collected these teachings from the Mishnah, Tosefta, Mekhilta, Sifre, Yerushalmi, Bereshit Rabbah, Leviticus Rabbah, Shir ha-Shirim Rabbah, Kohelet Rabbah, Eichah Rabbah, Ruth Rabbah, Esther Rabbah, Midrash Tehillim, Pesikta de-Rav Kahana, Pesikta Rabbati, and Tanhuma. Only once does he quote a teaching from Talmud Bavli (Eruvin 64a), which he introduces with the words "Taman amrin" (They say there). This, as well as the fact that all the amoraim mentioned in this midrash lived in the Land of Israel, justifies the assumption that its compiler lived there as well. His name and the time at which he lived can not be definitely determined. Zunz assigns him to the first half of the 11th century, although the reasons which he gives for this assumption have been refuted by S. Buber. Strack & Stemberger (1991) indicate that the work was composed much earlier than the 11th century (although later revised), since it is cited by Samuel ben Hofni, Nissim Gaon, and other early sources.

== Editions ==
A manuscript of this midrash is in the Parma Library. The first printed edition appeared at Constantinople in 1517. In 1546 it was printed again in Venice, and subsequently at various places and times. An 1893 edition was produced by Solomon Buber, with introduction and notes (Cracow). In 2009 the Schechter Institute of Jewish Studies in Jerusalem published a new critical edition in Hebrew, "based on the first edition with a thorough historical introduction, variant readings and a scientific commentary."

== Bibliography ==
- . The JE cites the following works:
  - Zunz, G. V. pp. 269–270;
  - Weiss, Dor, iii. 276;
  - S. Buber, preface to his edition of the midrash.
- Strack, H.L.; Stemberger, G. (1991), Introduction to the Talmud and Midrash, Edinburgh: T&T Clark, ISBN 978-0-8006-2524-5
