= Yalkut haMachiri =

Work of midrash

Yalkut haMachiri (Hebrew: ילקוט המכירי) is a work of midrash. Its author was Machir ben Abba Mari, but his country and the period in which he lived are not definitively known. Moritz Steinschneider says that Machir lived in Provence; but his date remains a subject of discussion among modern scholars. Strack & Stemberger (1991) say that the work was most probably composed in the late 13th or 14th century.

== Contents ==
Yalkut haMachiri is similar in its contents to Yalkut Shimoni, with the difference that while the latter covers the whole Bible, haMachiri covers only the books of Isaiah, Jeremiah, Ezekiel, the twelve Minor Prophets, Psalms, Proverbs, and Job.

In the introductions to these books Machir said he composed the work to gather the scattered aggadic teachings into one group.

=== Sources ===
Machir used the following sources in his compilation: the two Talmuds, the Tosefta, the minor treatises, the Sifra, the Sifre, Pesikta Rabbati, Midrash Rabbah on the Pentateuch, Midrash Ḳohelet, Midrash Tehillim, Midrash Mishle, Midrash Iyyob, Midrash Tanhuma, a Midrash quoted as דשחנו"ע, Pirkei de-Rabbi Eliezer, Seder Olam Rabbah, and Haggadat Shir ha-Shirim, frequently quoting the last-named Midrash in the part on Book of Isaiah. Machir had another version of Deuteronomy Rabbah, of which only the part on the section "Devarim" exists now. It is difficult to ascertain whether Machir knew of Midrash Yelammedenu; he quotes only Midrash Tanhuma, but the passages which he cites are not found in the present text of that work, so that it is possible that he took these passages from the Yelammedenu.

Only the following parts of the Yalḳuṭ ha-Makiri are extant: Isaiah, published by I. Spira from a Leyden manuscript; Psalms, published by S. Buber (Berdychev, 1899) from two manuscripts (one, previously in the possession of Joseph b. Solomon of Vyazhin, was used by David Luria, and its introduction was published by M. Straschun in Fuenn's Ḳiryah Ne'emanah, p. 304; the other is MS. No. 167 in the Bodleian Library); the twelve Minor Prophets; Proverbs, extant in a manuscript which is in the possession of Grünhut, and which was seen by Azulai, published by Grünhut in Jerusalem in 5662 (= 1902).

== Significance ==
Moses Gaster attached great importance to Yalkut haMachiri, thinking that it was older than Yalkut Shimoni, the second part of which at least Gaster concluded was a bad adaptation from Yalkut haMachiri. Gaster's conclusions, however, were contested by A. Epstein, who declares that Yalkut haMachiri is both inferior to and later than "Yalkut Shimoni." Buber conclusively proved that the two works are independent of each other, that Machir lived later than the author of the "Yalkut Shimoni," and that he had not seen Yalkut Shimoni. Samuel Poznanski thinks that Machir lived in the fourteenth century.
