= Ruth Rabbah =

Ruth Rabbah (Hebrew: רות רבה) is an aggadic and homiletic interpretation of the Book of Ruth. Like the midrash on the four other "megillot", it is included in the Midrash Rabbot.

== Structure and origin ==
This midrash is divided into eight chapters or sections ("parashiyyot"). It covers the whole text of the Biblical book, interpreting it verse by verse, with a mixture of literal and allegorical interpretations. The eight chapters terminate, respectively, with Ruth 1:2, 1:17, 1:21, 2:9, 3:7, 3:13, 4:15, and 4:19. As in Eichah Rabbah, the commentary proper on the Book of Ruth is preceded by a long introduction (petichta), which consists of several proems having no connection with one another.

The commentary itself (except in chapters 1 and 7, where it follows directly upon the Biblical text) is generally introduced by one or more proems. It is composed in the spirit of the Palestinian aggadists, its main sources being the Jerusalem Talmud, Bereshit Rabbah, Vayikra Rabbah, and Eichah Rabbah. It would seem, moreover, that its author was opposed to the Babylonian Talmud; for in his interpretation of 4:7 (a passage which is omitted in the printed editions) he disparages that work. It is true that parallel passages are found in Shir ha-Shirim Rabbah (which Ruth Rabbah closely resembles regarding arrangement and mode of interpretation) and in Kohelet Rabbah. But nothing proves that Shir ha-Shirim Rabbah is anterior to Ruth Rabbah, while Kohelet Rabbah is recognized by modern scholars to be posterior to this midrash.

It apparently contains no Babylonian aggadot, and, although in 1:3 (= 2:4) it gives the aggadic interpretation of I Chronicles 4:22, which is also found in Bava Batra 91b, it may be seen that the source in Bava Batra is a baraita and not a Babylonian aggadah. Thus Ruth Rabbah is one of the earlier midrashim, composed about the same time as or shortly after Shir ha-Shirim Rabbah. According to Zunz, Ruth Rabbah (as well as Shir ha-Shirim Rabbah and Kohelet Rabbah) was one of the sources of the Yelammedenu, Devarim Rabbah, Pesikta Rabbati, and Shemot Rabbah, being a medium between these midrashim and the older aggadah.

== Examples of Aggadah ==
Ruth Rabbah is specially interesting from a cultural-historical point of view, in that it endeavors to throw light on the habits and conditions of the time in which the incidents of the Book of Ruth took place. Thus, interpreting the phrase "in the days when the judges judged" (Ruth 1:1), as "in the days when the people judged their judges," the author argues that there was a time when the judges perverted their judgments so that they were held responsible by the people. But when was there such a time, and who were those judges? According to Rav, the judges were Barak and Deborah; according to R. Huna, Deborah, Barak, and Jael; and according to Joshua b. Levi, Ehud and Shamgar. The famine is circumstantially described; it was one of the ten great famines which afflicted the entire world.

Elimelech is portrayed unfavorably, his name being interpreted as meaning "one eager for royalty." He left the land of Canaan not because he would himself suffer from the famine, but because he was afraid that the people might ask him for help. In interpreting 1:14, the author of this midrash expresses his views with regard to kissing. According to an anonymous authority, kisses are permitted on three occasions only: on conferring a high office, as when Samuel kissed Saul; at meetings, as when Aaron kissed Moses; and at parting, as when Orpah kissed her mother-in-law. According to R. Tanhuma, kissing is permitted also to relatives, as when Jacob kissed Rachel. Under other circumstances kissing is declared indecent. The description of Ruth's insistence on following Naomi (Ruth 1:16-18) is very graphic, in that, when her attention was directed by her mother-in-law to the laws relating to proselytes, she accepted them all.

Both Naomi and Ruth are described as righteous women whose acts were charitable. Ruth particularly is pointed out as being modest and of exemplary manners. In its interpretation of 3:3, the midrash shows the necessity of honoring Shabbat by wearing special garments. In 3:13 there is a version of the story of Elisha ben Abuyah, the main source of which is Hagigah 14b. The midrash terminates with a statement to the effect that the Messiah is to descend from Ruth through David.

With regard to lexical interpretations, in certain cases the explanation of words is not contrary to grammatical rules, but sometimes, as in all the other midrashim, the interpretation is arbitrary. Thus, while "Elimelech" is interpreted as composed of "elai" and "melek" (= "to me belongs royalty"; compare above), "Naomi" as "she whose acts are agreeable," and "Orpah" (from "'oref"="the nape of the neck") as "she who turned her back [comp. Jeremiah 2:27 and elsewhere] upon her mother-in-law," "Vayehi" is interpreted as an exclamation of sorrow; and "Ruth" (derived from ראה = "to see") as "she who saw or considered her mother-in-law's words."

For commentaries on and editions of Ruth Rabbah, see Eichah Rabbah, Esther Rabbah, and Kohelet Rabbah.
