= She'iltot =

Geonic halakhic work

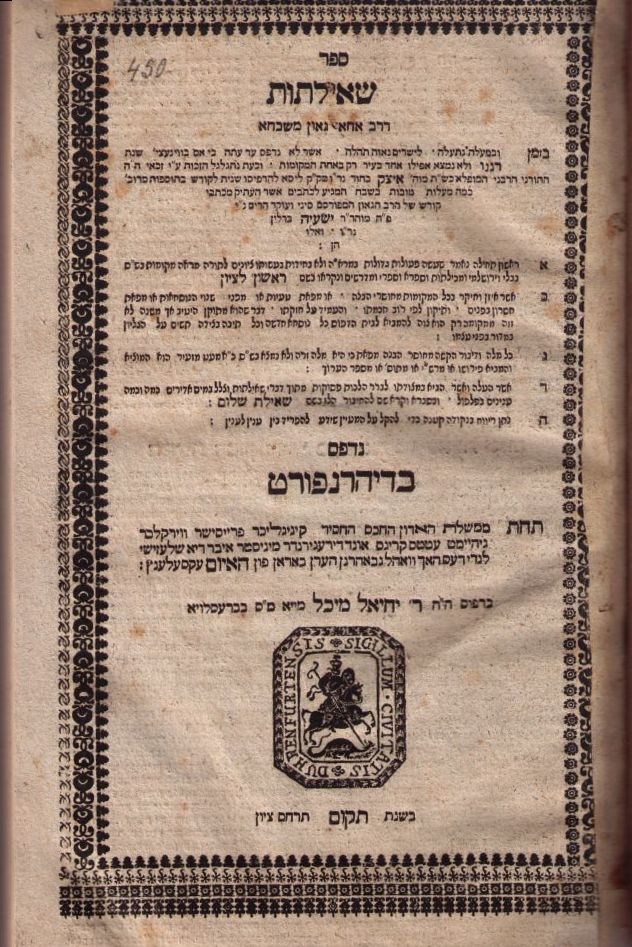
Title page of an 1786 edition of She'iltot

She'iltot of Rav Achai Gaon, also known as Sheiltot de-Rav Ahai, or simply She'iltot (Hebrew: שאלתות), is a rabbinic halakhic work composed in the 8th century by Ahai of Shabha (variants: Aḥa of Shabha; Acha of Shabcha), during the geonic period. She'iltot is an Aramaic word, meaning "Inquiries" or "Quæstiones" (in the sense of disquisitions) and is arranged in order of the biblical pericopes, or weekly Torah readings. The She'iltot is one of the earliest rabbinic works composed after the Talmud.

== Place of composition ==
According to Abraham ibn Daud, Aḥai of Shabha completed his She'iltot between the years 741 and 763 CE, a timeframe corroborated by Sherira ben Hanina in his Iggeret. It is unclear whether he compiled his work in Lower Mesopotamia (called "Babylonia") or in the Land of Israel, where he moved from Babylonia around the time that Natroi (Natronai) Kahana, his subordinate, was made the Gaon of Babylonia in 748 CE. Some scholars conjecture that Aḥai must have written She'iltot in the Land of Israel, for the Aramaic word šˀelṯā (Jewish Palestinian Aramaic: שְאֵילְתָא) was employed in the sense of quæstio (the scientific investigation of a matter) only by the Jews of Israel. These argue that Sheilta is of Hebrew origin, as is shown by the words buṣina and bisha, which accompany it. Samuel Mendelsohn wrote extensively about the explanation of this term.

Others seek to prove a Palestinian influence in Aḥai's work by his frequent use of the Jerusalem Talmud and of Hebrew Midrashim, Leviticus Rabbah, Ecclesiastes Rabbah, and Tanḥuma, all of which were thought to be unknown at this time in Babylonia, although this rationale is refuted by Louis Ginzberg who argues that all the alleged quotations from the Jerusalem Talmud can in fact be traced to other sources. Aḥai, in his She'iltot, also made use of the Avot of Rabbi Natan.

The contemporary synopses of Babylonian rabbis Yehudai ben Nahman (author of Halakhot Pesukot) and Simeon Kayyara (author of Halakhot Gedolot) confine themselves to important decisions of the Talmud, with the omission of all discussions, and with the addition of short elucidations of words - as these works were intended for scholars rather than common people. Aḥai, in contrast, wrote for thoughtful laymen. Aḥai's treatises upon Biblical and rabbinical laws (numbering 190 or 191, with additions from later writers) were written with special reference to the practice of such moral duties as benevolence, love, respect for parents, and love of truth.

== Style ==
Among halakhic works, She'iltot is unique in that it opens each section with the word she'ilta (= "inquiry). Frequently, sections are followed by the intermediate phrase of ברם צריך (beram ṣarikh = "it was, however, necessary [to state]"), by means of further elaborating on the topic. Because of the author's frequent use of this expression, Nathan ben Abraham, when writing his own commentary on the Mishnah, refers to the She'iltot by the name Beramot.

Each inquiry deals with one halakhic topic in a special order and style, divided into four parts: an opening with a particular biblical command (mitzvah), a halakhic question related to it, the aggadic teachings generally related to the topic, and finally an answer to the halakhic question.

The beginning of the fourth Sheilta, which is based upon the weekly lesson on Noah, may serve as a specimen of the Sheiltot. Stealing or robbery was explicitly forbidden to the Israelites; and the divine punishment for the transgression of this command is more severe than for other crimes. Thus, the generation of the Flood were punished solely on account of their violence, as it is said, "The end of all flesh is come before me; for the earth is filled with violence through them." Aḥai elaborates on this moral condemnation, quoting from the Talmud and Midrash many passages concerning the baseness and godlessness of such crimes. He follows this statement (preceded by the introductory formula, "It was, however, necessary [to state]" [ברם צריך = beram ṣarikh]) with casuistic inquiries; for example, whether it is proper to include in the designation of robbery, for which the Law requires a double restitution, the case of a theft committed in the interest of the victim.

This illustration serves to show that the work is not intended for scholars alone, but also for popular instruction. However, the statement (often repeated since the time of Meiri) that the Sheiltot was a book merely for the instruction of youth is also baseless. More likely, it is a collection of aggadic-halakhic sermons, which Aḥai delivered in Palestine, where certainly he was held in high regard. According to Ginzberg, with the decline of rabbinical knowledge in Palestine, Aḥai would have found but few pupils for pure halakhic instruction; and he therefore added aggadic elements to his lectures, in obedience to the general disposition of the Palestinians, who just then favored aggadah.

This view best explains the word derashah (lecture), which occurs about thirty times in the Sheiltot, in connection with the citation of passages from the Talmud. If the Sheiltot were indeed derived from sermons, they may properly be considered, in the form in which they appear, as extracts or abstracts of such sermons, giving the introduction and the conclusion of the original derashah; while of the derashah proper (which no doubt consisted of aggadic and halakhic quotations from Talmud and Midrash) only the heading is mentioned. Considering them as portions of sermons, the frequent repetitions that occur in the Sheiltot are not strange, as this would happen to the best of preachers; while it would be difficult to explain to them if they were found in the strictly literary productions of one man.

Recent scholars, when reviewing the fragments of the She'iltot discovered in the Cairo Geniza (now in the Antonin Collection at the National Library of Russia in St. Petersburg) and comparing them with the printed text, observed that the printed text lacks much that, according to older authorities, was formerly included. Various explanations have been given for these variants, some alleging that they are merely a later recension.

== Impact ==
Aḥai's work very soon won great esteem, following in the footsteps of his predecessor Simeon Kayyara, who compiled the Halakot Gedolot in the year 741. Sherira ben Hanina and his son Hai mention the book by title, and it was likewise freely consulted by Rashi and Nathan ben Jehiel.

Today, scholars closely examine Aḥai's She'iltot to determine the original textual variants found in the Babylonian Talmud.

== Printed editions ==
The first edition of the "Sheiltot" appeared in Venice, 1546, from which a facsimile edition was published by Makor Publishing Ltd. in Jerusalem in 1971. The first printing in Venice was succeeded by the following:

- An edition with a short commentary by Isaiah Berlin (Dyhernfurth, 1786);
- Another edition under the title תועפות ראם, with the commentary of Isaac Pardo, Salonica, 1800–01;
- An edition with an extended commentary by Naftali Zvi Yehuda Berlin (Wilna, 1861, 1864, 1867). This edition contains the commentary of Isaiah Berlin, as well as a number of variant readings taken from a manuscript of the year 1460, and a short commentary by Saul ben Joseph, who probably lived in the first half of the 14th century (reprint Jerusalem, 1955).
- She'iltot (Samuel Kalman Mirsky, ed., She'iltot de-R. Achai Ga'on, vols. 1-2 [Jerusalem: Ha-Makhon la-Mehkar u-le-Hoza'at Sefarim Sura ve-Yeshiva Universita, 1982]), being a variorum edition with extensive notes and alternative manuscript readings, along with commentaries from medieval manuscripts, originally composed in five volumes, the final one posthumous, (New York & Jerusalem, 1960–1974).
- She'iltot de-Rav Ahai Gaon, 3 volumes (Mossad Harav Kook, Jerusalem)

Manuscripts of the Sheiltot, but with essential divergences from the printed text, are to be found among the Hebrew manuscripts in the Bibliothèque Nationale, Paris, Nos. 308, 309, and in the Bodleian Library, Oxford, Nos. 539, 540, 1317. In the latter library may be found also the hitherto unprinted commentaries by Solomon ben Shabbethai (541), and Johanan ben Reuben (542).

== Manuscripts ==
- Sassoon Ms., described in Catalogue Ohel Dawid, vol. 1, pp. 112–123. Manuscript is written in an Oriental semi-cursive hand of the 12th century, contains 256 pages, written on paper and defective in parts, beginning in Parashat Vayetze. Sassoon points out differences between this Ms. and the Ms. used by Dyhrenfurt.
- Cincinnati Ms., Hebrew Union College (Ms. said to be a thousand years old)
- Vatican Ms. (Vat. ebr. 51), at the Vatican Library in Rome. Parchment, 14th century. Description of Ms. given by S.K. Mirsky in his edition of She'iltot (Jerusalem 1960), Introduction, pp. 31–33
- Netziv Ms., The Jewish Theological Seminary of America
- Oxford Ms., Bodleian Library, MS. Oppenheim 70 (Neubauer's Catologue no. 539), dated 1492
- Oxford Ms., Bodleian Library, MS. Huntington 343 (Neubauer's Catalogue no. 540), 15th-century
- Paris Ms., no. 308 (Bibliothèque Nationale)
- Paris Ms., no. 309 (Bibliothèque Nationale)
- Budapest Ms.
- Mertzbacher Ms., no. 113

== Bibliography ==
- Ibn-Daʾud, Avraham; Ben-Ḥalaftâ, Yôsê (1955). M.D. Yerushalmi (ed.). Seder ʿolam raba ṿe-seder ʿolam zota ṿe-sefer ha-Ḳabalah le-ha-Rabad (in Hebrew). Jerusalem: Gil Publishers. OCLC 754774918.
- Mescheloff, David (2017). "English Summary". Sidra: A Journal for the Study of Rabbinic Literature. 32. Bar Ilan University Press: V–VIII. JSTOR 26377693.
- Morell, Samuel (1995). "Review: Le-Toldot Nusaḥ ha-She'iltot [The Textual History of the She'iltot]". AJS Review. 20 (1). Association for Jewish Studies: 205–207. doi:10.1017/S0364009400006528. JSTOR 1486496.
- Moscovitz, Leib (2003). ""Designation Is Significant": An Analysis of the Conceptual Sugya in bSan 47b-48b". AJS Review. 27 (2). Association for Jewish Studies: 227–252. doi:10.1017/S0364009403000084. JSTOR 4131606.
- Saldarini, Anthony J. (2020). Historical Conclusions: A Literary Study of the Fathers According to Rabbi Nathan. Brown Judaic Studies. pp. 135–142. doi:10.2307/j.ctvzgb987.14. JSTOR j.ctvzgb987.14.
- Sherira Gaon (1988). The Iggeres of Rav Sherira Gaon. Translated by Nosson Dovid Rabinowich. Jerusalem: Rabbi Jacob Joseph School Press - Ahavath Torah Institute Moznaim. OCLC 923562173.
- This article incorporates text from a publication now in the public domain: Singer, Isidore; et al., eds. (1901–1906). "Aha (Ahai) of Shabha". The Jewish Encyclopedia. New York: Funk & Wagnalls. Its bibliography:
- Reifmann, in Bet Talmud, iii. 26–29, 52–59, 71–79, 108–117;
- S. Buber, ibid. 209–215;
- Weiss, Dor, iv. 23–26, and the passages mentioned in the index;
- A. Harkavy, Studien und Mittheilungen, iv. xxvi. and p. 373;
- Isaac Halevy, Dorot ha-Rishonim, pp. 193, 211–214, Presburg, 1897;
- J.L. Rapoport, Bikkure ha-'Ittim, x. 20 et seq.;
- Fürst, Literaturblatt d. Orients, xii. 313;
- Steinschneider, Cat. Bodl. No. 4330;
- A. Jellinek, ḳunṭres ha-Maggid, p. 20, Vienna, 1878;
- S. Mendelsohn, in Rev. Ét. Juives, xxxii. 56–62.
