= Midrash Proverbs =

Midrash Proverbs (Hebrew: מדרש משלי, Midrash Mishlei) is the aggadic midrash to the Book of Proverbs.

== Names ==
It is first mentioned under the title "Midrash Mishlei" by R. Hananeel b. Ḥushiel. Nathan of Rome called it "Aggadat Mishlei". In addition, it was erroneously called "Shocher Tov", a name which properly refers to Midrash Tehillim.

== Content ==
This midrash is different from all the other aggadic midrashim, in that its interpretations approach the simple exegesis then in vogue, being brief and free from the prolixity found in the other midrashim, so that this work is in the form of a commentary rather than in that of a midrash. The interpretations follow immediately upon the words of the text, without the introductory formulas found in the other midrashim, "as Scripture says," or "Rabbi N. N. began" (the latter formula, however, occurs at the beginning of the midrash). The editor of the midrash drew upon the Mishnah, Tosefta, Mekhilta, Sifre, Pesikta de-Rav Kahana, Avot de-Rabbi Natan, Bereshit Rabbah, Vayikra Rabbah, Ecclesiastes Rabbah, Canticles Rabbah, and the Babylonian Talmud. But he does not seem to have known anything about the Jerusalem Talmud, since he does not quote from it. The editor was therefore probably a Babylonian Jew, although this cannot be definitely decided.

The midrash has not been fully preserved; for there are no comments on several chapters (3, 7, 18), and other chapters have only partial comments. The editor of Yalkut Shimoni used some portions of this midrash which are now missing, although it may be assumed that not all the teachings which he attributed to this midrash were really a part of the Midrash Mishlei which he had at hand.

The exact time of composition cannot be determined. Zunz holds dates it to the mid-11th century; but this is dubious inasmuch as it is mentioned by name by Hananeel and Nathan, both of whom lived in the early 11th century. Buber thinks that the midrash was compiled as early as the 8th century, since quotations from it are found (though without references to the source) at the end of the Halakot Gedolot and in the Seder R. Amram 12b. Although the midrash contains comparatively few legends, myths, or parables, it has many interesting teachings with no parallel in other midrashim. For instance, the four riddles which the Queen of Sheba propounded to King Solomon are found in no other extant midrash, but they correspond to the first four of the nineteen riddles mentioned in the manuscript Midrash ha-Ḥefez.

== Manuscripts and editions ==
Aside from the manuscripts of Midrash Mishlei mentioned by S. Buber, there is one in the JTS library. This manuscript, which includes only chapters 1-15, corresponds in many passages with the Constantinople edition. In 14:34 it has "Metatron" instead of "Michael," as in the printed editions. If this reading is the original one, it would confirm the assumption that the editor was a Babylonian, since the name "Metatron" occurs only a few times in the sources from Israel, the name "Michael" being found instead.

The first edition was issued at Constantinople without date; the second, at Venice in 1547. Apart from these two, eight other editions have been issued. The latest and best edition in 1900 was that by Buber, with an introduction and notes. Midrash Mishle has been translated into German by August Wünsche.
