= David Luria =

Rabbi from the Russian Empire

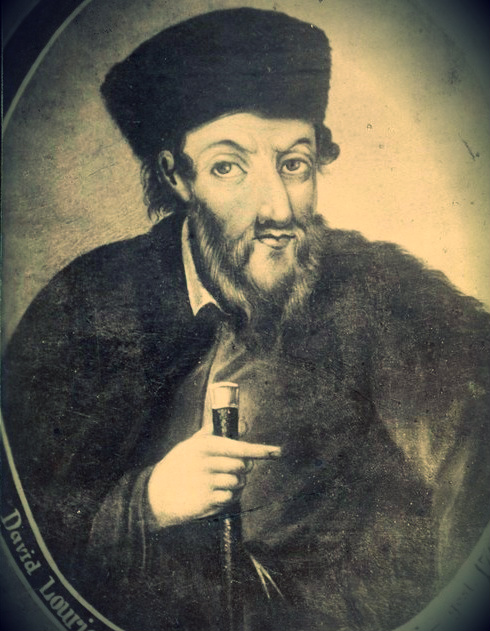
- Born: 1798; Bykhov, Russian Empire
- Died: 1855 (aged 56–57)
- Occupations: Rabbi; commentator; linguist
- Known for: Commentaries on the Babylonian Talmud and Pirkei de-Rabbi Eliezer

David Luria (1798–1855) was a rabbi, commentator, and linguist, one of the greatest Torah scholars in his generation. He authored commentaries on the Babylonian Talmud and Pirkei de-Rabbi Eliezer.

== Biography ==
He was born to a wealthy family in Bykhov in the Russian Empire (now in eastern Belarus). His family was descended from Solomon Luria (Maharshal), which claimed descent from Rashi and thence to King David. At age 12 he moved to study in Vilna, in connection with an arranged marriage which he entered at age 13. At age 18 he returned to Bykhov and contributed to the establishment of a yeshiva there.

He was known for his great memory, which allowed him to compose works including comparisons of various textual variants of the Talmud and midrashic works.

At age 40 he fell victim to a libel. Letters from him, and passages in his commentary to Pirkei de-Rabbi Eliezer, were forged indicating a supposed call to rebellion against the Russian Empire. He was jailed for six months in the Shlisselburg prison, after which his name was cleared. The motivation for the libel is speculated to be a dispute between various families in Bykhov.

He was considered one of the leaders of Eastern European Jewry in the era following the Vilna Gaon, and had extensive involvement in public affairs. In 1846, he met Moses Montefiore with the intent of informing him of the situation of Russian Jews at the time. He also denounced Reform Jews of the period for changing certain parts of the prayer service.

== Works ==
- Glosses to the Mishna; Babylonian Talmud; the Vilna Gaon's commentary to Seder Zeraim of the Jerusalem Talmud; the Sheiltot of Ahai Gaon; and the gaonic responsa compilation Shaarei Teshuva
- Commentaries on Seder Moed of the Jerusalem Talmud; Tosefta tractate Uktzin; Pirkei De-Rabbi Eliezer; Midrash Shmuel; Pesikta deRav Kahana; Midrash Rabbah; Megillat Esther
- Nefesh David
- Kochavei Or
- Responsa

== Bibliography ==
- Encyclopedia Ivrit, 21:558
- Yonah Frenkel, Midrash VaAgadah, Open University, 3:922–923
