= Exodus Rabbah =

Midrash interpreting the Book of Exodus

Exodus Rabbah (Hebrew: שמות רבה, romanized: Shemot Rabbah) is the midrash to Exodus.

== Contents ==
Exodus Rabbah is almost purely aggadic in character.

It contains 52 sections. It consists of two sections with different styles, dubbed "Exodus Rabbah I" (sections 1–14, covering Exodus chapters 1–10) and "Exodus Rabbah II" (sections 15–52), which were written separately and later joined.

Leopold Zunz ascribes the composition of the entire work to the 11th or 12th century; although, immediately following Bereshit Rabbah in the collection of the rabbot, it "is separated from the latter by 500 years". It was first quoted by Azriel of Gerona and then by Nachmanides, placing its composition no later than the early 13th century. Various modern scholars place its composition in the 10th to 12th centuries.

=== Exodus Rabbah I ===
In sections 1-14 the proems are almost invariably followed by the running commentary on the entire seder or other Scriptural division (the beginnings of the sedarim are distinguished by an asterisk):

- Section 1, on *Exodus 1:1-2:25;
- Sections 2 and 3, on *Exodus 3:1-4:17;
- Sections 4 and 5 (Nos. 2–8), on *Exodus 4:18-26;
- Section 5 (Nos. 1, 9-23), on Exodus 4:27-6:1;
- Section 6, on *Exodus 6:2-12;
- Section 7, on Exodus 6:13 et seq.;
- Section 8, on Exodus 7:1 et seq. (a Tanhuma homily);
- Section 9, on *Exodus 7:8-25;
- Section 10, on Exodus 7:26-8:15;
- Section 11, on *Exodus 8:16-9:12;
- Section 12, on Exodus 9:13-35;
- Section 13, on *Exodus 10:1-20;
- Section 14, on Exodus 10:21-29

There is no exposition, nor (in the Tanhuma midrashim) any homily, to *Exodus 11:1.

The assumption is justified that Shemot Rabbah down to Exodus 12:1, with which section the Mekhilta begins, is based on an earlier exegetical midrash, perhaps constituting the continuation of Bereshit Rabbah. This would explain the fact that in Exodus Rabbah I there are several sections to the open and closed Scripture sections, and that several expressions recall the terminology of the tannaitic midrash.

=== Exodus Rabbah II ===
Beginning with section 15, Exodus Rabbah contains homilies and homiletical fragments to the first verses of the Scripture sections. Many of the homilies are taken from the Tanḥumas, though sections 15, 16–19, 20, 30, and others show that the author had access also to homilies in many other sources.

In the printed editions the text is sometimes abbreviated and the reader referred to such collections, as well as to the Pesikta Rabbati; in section 39 the entire exposition of the Pesikta Rabbati lesson Ki Tissa (Exodus 30:11) has been eliminated in this fashion. Such references and abbreviations were doubtless made by later copyists.

There is an interesting statement in section 44 regarding the manner of treating a proem-text from the Psalms for the homily to Exodus 32:13.
