= Hedyot (rabbinic term) =

Greek loanword used in Hebrew

Hedyot (Hebrew: הדיוט) is a rabbinic term used in Mishnah, Talmud, and Midrash to designate a private, ordinary person. It is based on the Greek 'Iδιότμς.

== Description ==
A hedyot refers to a person who is not among the class of kings, priests, and religious functionaries, as noted in a Talmudic statement "three kings and four hedyoṭot" (Sanhedrin 90a). Other rabbinic statements indicate that the word hedyot may be invoked to refer to a commoner as opposed to "sons of kings" (Numbers Rabbah 8:4); a common priest (kohen) rather than the high priest (Yevamot 59a), and a Samaritan as opposed to a Jew (Sanhedrin 21b). The term also differentiates the human person from God (Ḳiddushin 28b). Hedyot also characterizes an untrained as opposed to a skilled worker (Mo'ed Katan 10a).

In judicial practice, a hedyot is a layperson who serves as a judge, rather than an expert (mumkheh). For example, a single expert can remove the serious sanction of herem (censure) from a sinner, but such a removal would take three people of hedyot status. Likewise, civil matters can be judged by three hedyot (regular) persons, since it is assumed that at least one of them will have sufficient familiarity with the rabbinic law involved. In contemporary debates in Israel over conversions to Judaism, an Orthodox judge objected to the creation of special conversion courts, saying that if any hedyot (ordinary rabbi) can set up a rabbinic court, "it opens a door to total chaos."

Hedyot status has various implications in rabbinic law. For example, a hedyot can make an oral statement to dedicate their property to the Temple, without the usual actions needed to transfer property to another person (Kiddushin 28b–29a).

=== Pejorative usage ===
Hedyot may also have a negative connotation, as when it refers to an ignorant, low character, uncultured, or ill-mannered individual (ha-hedyoṭ ḳofeẓ be-rosh). For example, it is used in the phrase, "the lowest man rushes ahead," about a person who gives his opinion first in the presence of prominent men (Megillah 12b).

=== Popular parlance ===
The word hedyot is also used in the rabbinic law principle, doreshin leshon hedyot, which means that legal documents are interpreted according to popular parlance. This use of popular language stand in contrast to the language of the experts (Bava Metzia 104a). This principle assumes that the parties intend to rely on the usual conditions of a document, such as a contract. In a sense, this principle relies on local custom (minhag). Over the centuries, rabbinic judges applied the principle of doreshin leshon hedyot to interpret cases involving obligations, marriage, property, and other document in halakhah.

=== Other technical terms ===
In rabbinic literature, hedyot is used in other technical terms, including mashal hedyoṭ (a proverb or popular saying) as used frequently in midrash anthologies; sheeṭrei hedyot (private writings, letters, or documents) are opposed to Biblical books (Shabbat 116b); and parah hedyoṭit, which is a cow of common stock that was not trained for plowing (Ruth Rabbah 1:19).

=== Symbolic uses ===
As longstanding jargon in Jewish culture, the term hedyot also lends itself to symbolic use. In 2015, for example, a contemporary rabbi gave a sermon entitled "Hedyot" that recounted the Talmudic story (Berakhot 7a) of God asking the high priest (Yishmael ben Elisha) for a blessing. As God affirmed the blessing, the Talmud "teaches that you should not take the blessing of a hedyot (= 'commoner') lightly." This sermon says that the hedyot story comes at a time, after the destruction of the Temple, after the high priest no longer has an official role, that ordinary Jews can have a mutual relationship with God, nobody is holy in the ancient sense.
