= Devarim =

Devarim (דברים) may refer to:

- The Hebrew title of the biblical Book of Deuteronomy
- Devarim (parsha), the 44th weekly parsha in the annual Jewish cycle of Torah readings
- Devarim (film), a 1995 film by Amos Gitai

== See also ==
- Devarim Rabbah is the midrash about the Book of Deuteronomy
- Devarim Zutta is a midrash to Deuteronomy which is no longer extant
