= Deuteronomy Rabbah =

Midrash

Deuteronomy Rabbah (Hebrew: דברים רבה) is an aggadah or homiletic commentary on the Book of Deuteronomy.

It does not contain running commentaries on the entire book of Deuteronomy. Rather, it consists of 25 complete, independent homilies (and two fragmentary ones) on 27 sections of Deuteronomy, most of which are recognizable as sedarim (the Sabbatical lessons for public worship according to the Palestinian three-year cycle). The commentary covers only one verse, or a few verses, from each section.

== Sections ==
The index to the Mikraot Gedolot (Venice, 1525) gives 27 sedarim in Deuteronomy. Devarim Rabbah contains homilies on 19 of these, and on a fragment, which, according to the editions, belongs to another seder (Deuteronomy 29:9). There are no homilies on 7 or 8 of the sedarim mentioned in Mikraot Gedolot (Deuteronomy 11:10, 14:1, 15:7, 23:10, 23:22, 24:19, 26:1, and occasionally and conditionally 29:9). One homily in Devarim Rabbah is on a section mentioned in other sources as a seder (Deuteronomy 4:25). Five more homilies appear on sections (Deuteronomy 1:10, 4:7, 11:26, 24:9, and 29:1) which were not otherwise known as sedarim. These variations may be due to differing customs regarding the division of the cycle of sedarim.

In some of these homilies, moreover, the halakhic exordiums (see below) close with the words מנין ממה שקרינו בענין ..., which clearly show that the Scriptural sections on which the homilies were pronounced were used for public lessons. Devarim Rabbah probably includes only the homilies on the Sabbatical lessons of the cycle of sedarim, as it contains no homilies on the lessons of the Pesikta cycle belonging to Deuteronomy, Deuteronomy 14:22 and 25:17 (Deuteronomy 33:1 is a seder as well as a Pesikta section).

The economy of this Midrash containing sedarim homilies on Deuteronomy, as well as the character of the individual homilies, could easily have been misconstrued and forgotten after the division of the Torah into pericopes according to the one-year cycle had come into general use. In present editions Devarim Rabbah is divided only according to these latter pericopes; it was not noticed that the homilies on Ki Tetze and Ki Tavo did not correspond with the beginnings of the pericopes (Deuteronomy 21:10 and 26:1). The sidrot Nitzavim and Vayelech formed one pericope in the oldest Midrash editions; hence in these editions Devarim Rabbah contains only ten sections, corresponding with the pericopes. The further designation of these sections as "parashiyyot" and their enumeration from 1 to 11, dividing Nitzavim and Vayelech, are addenda of the later editions.

According to its original composition, this midrash includes the following homilies (the passages marked with an asterisk are sedarim):

1. 1:1-9 (according to the Vilna edition), on * Deut. 1:1
2. 1:10-14, on Deut 1:10
3. 1:15-20, on *Deut. 2:2
4. 1:21-25, on *Deut. 2:31
5. 2:1-9, on *Deut. 3:23
6. 2:10-17, on Deut. 4:7
7. 2:18-24, on *Deut. 4:25
8. 2:25-30, on *Deut. 4:41
9. 2:31-37, on *Deut. 6:4
10. 3:1-7, on *Deut. 7:12
11. 3:8-11, on *Deut. 9:1
12. 3:12-17, on *Deut. 10:1
13. 4:1-5, on Deut. 11:26
14. 4:6-11, on *Deut. 12:20
15. 5:1-7, on *Deut. 16:18
16. 5:8-11, on *Deut. 17:14
17. 5:12-15, on *Deut. 20:10
18. 6:1-7, on *Deut. 22:6
19. 6:8-14, on Deut. 24:9
20. 7:1-7, on *Deut. 28:1
21. 7:8-12, on Deut. 29:1 (8:1, merely a halakhic exordium, doubtful if belonging to *Deut.29:9)
22. 8:2-7, on *Deut. 30:11
23. 9:1-9, on *Deut. 31:14
24. 10:1-4, on *Deut. 32:1
25. 11:1-5, and probably 7–8, on Deut. 33:1 (11:6 is an interpolated second halakhic exordium; 11:8 probably closes the homily and the Midrash, the remaining pieces being additions borrowed from the Midrash on the death of Moses).

== Structure of each section ==
Each homily has a set structure: it begins with a halakhic exordium, has one or more proems, followed by the commentary (covering only the first verse, or a few verses from the beginning of the section read), and ends with an easily recognizable peroration containing a promise of the Messianic future or some other consolatory thought, followed by a verse of the Bible.

The comments referring only to the first verses of the lesson characterize Devarim Rabbah as a Midrash of homilies, in which even the proems are independent homilies rather than introductions to the comment on the Scriptural section. The exordiums show that Devarim Rabbah is very similar to the Tanḥuma Midrashim.

In the halakhic exordium (an essential of the aggadic discourse which is found neither in Pesikta Rabbati and Vayikra Rabbah nor in Bereshit Rabbah), an apparently irrelevant legal question is put, and answered with a passage from the Mishnah (about twenty times) or Tosefta, etc. Such answers are generally introduced in Devarim Rabbah by the formula כך שנו חכמים, though the formula commonly used in the Tanhuma (כך שנו רבותינו) occurs twice (in 1:10,15). Then follow other halakhic explanations (compare 5:8; 7:1; 7:8; 9:1; 11:1) and aggadic interpretations, the last of which are deduced from the Scriptural section of the Sabbath lesson. Thus, a connection between the halakhic question and the text or the first verse of the lesson is found, and the speaker can proceed to the further discussion of the homily, the exordiums closing generally with the formula מנין ממה שקרינו בענין, followed by the first words of the Scriptural section. The formula occurs 18 times as cited; twice as מנין שכתוב בענין; once as מנין שכך כתוב; twice as מנין שנאמר; it is lacking altogether in only a few of the homilies.

=== Resemblance to Yelamdenu ===
The stylistic manner of opening the discourse with a halakhic question is so closely connected with the original Midrash Tanḥuma, however, that in consequence of the introductory formula ילמדנו רבינו ("May our teacher instruct us?"), with which the exordiums and hence the homilies began, the name "Yelamdenu" was also given to this Midrash. Even in early times some scholars concluded from the halakhic exordiums in Devarim Rabbah that this Midrash was derived in large part from the Yelamdenu; as did Abraham ben Solomon Akra.

== Comparison to other midrashim ==
Curiously, while in Devarim Rabbah every homily has a halakhic exordium, in the extant Tanhuma the part on Deuteronomy is without any exordium (the Tanhuma edited by S. Buber lacks the exordiums to Exodus also). However, it would be erroneous to conclude from this that the present Devarim Rabbah must be identified with Tanhuma, and Tanhuma to Deuteronomy with Devarim Rabbah. It would also be erroneous to conclude that Devarim Rabbah, the Tanhuma on Deuteronomy, and several other Midrashim to Deuteronomy of which fragments have been published in modern times (or from which quotations are found in old authors), have all borrowed from the original Yelamdenu.

If the designation "Tanḥuma homilies" be given to the homilies with this structure (consisting of halakhic introductions, proems, comments on various verses, etc.), modeled on the form of the Yelamdenu Tanhuma, and if Yelamdenu was also the model for the aggadic discourses in the centuries immediately following Tanḥuma, it may be said that Devarim Rabbah contains these homilies in a much more primitive form and also in a more complete collection than does Tanhuma to Deuteronomy in Buber's and the earlier editions; for these editions are extant in a very defective form, treat many fewer sedarim than Devarim Rabbah, and are (with few exceptions) only shorter or longer fragments of sedarim homilies.

Given that the structure of the homilies and the composition of the whole work, lend to Devarim Rabbah the appearance of a Tanhuma Midrash, it is not strange that passages from Tanhuma are quoted, in some citations of earlier authors (in the 13th century and later), as belonging to Tanḥuma. Textually, Devarim Rabbah has little in common with the Tanḥuma Midrashim on Deuteronomy, either in the editions or in the extracts from Tanḥuma in Yalkut Shimoni or from Yelamdenu in Yalkut Shimoni and Arukh. Some halakhic questions found also in Tanḥuma in homilies on Genesis, Exodus, and Leviticus are quite differently applied and developed in the exordiums of Devarim Rabbah. This Midrash, in its use of the old sources (such as Yerushalmi, Bereshit Rabbah, and Vayikra Rabbah) often shows a freer treatment, and endeavors to translate Aramaic passages into Hebrew and to modernize them.

== Probable date ==
As regards the time of writing or editing the Devarim Rabbah, "the epoch of the year 900" comes, according to Zunz, "perhaps" nearest the mark. The Midrash was not known either to Nathan ben Jehiel, the author of the Arukh, or to Rashi (the passage in a citation quoted by the latter is not found in Devarim Rabbah). A large number of extracts are found in Yalkut Shimoni, generally with the designation of the Midrash אלה הדברים רבה, as it is commonly cited by the older authors.

== Manuscripts similar to the modern Devarim Rabbah ==
The name Devarim Rabbah is given to the Midrash on Deuteronomy in Codex Munich, No. 229. This contains for the first pericope (Devarim) four entirely different homilies, which have only a few points of similarity to the modern Devarim Rabbah, but which are likewise composed according to the Tanhuma form, and are on the same Scriptural sections as the homilies in Devarim Rabbah (on Deuteronomy 1:1, 1:10, 2:2, 2:31). The second and third pericopes have also halakhic exordiums closing with the words, מנין ממה שקרינו בענין..., in which, however, the question is put without any formula. The Munich manuscript agrees with Devarim Rabbah in the pericopes Ekev to Nitzavim, but has additions to the latter; the remaining pericopes are lacking.

Another manuscript Midrash, which was in the possession of A. Epstein circa 1900, contains not only the same homilies as Codex Munich for the pericope Devarim, but also has similar homilies for the pericope Va'etchanan, which are entirely different from Devarim Rabbah and are on the sedarim Deuteronomy 3:23 (not 4:7), 4:25, 4:41, 6:4; all these four homilies have halakhic exordiums. The manuscript also has a different exordium for the beginning of Ekev. From this point to the pericope Ki Tavo, it agrees with the print editions (the exordiums, however, are preceded only by the word הלכה, without אדם מישראל); in pericope Nitvavim and its additions it agrees with the Codex Munich. For Vayelech (also on Deuteronomy 31:14) it has a different text; and in the last two pericopes (Haazinu and Vezot Habracha) it agrees with Midrash Tanhuma in present editions. It may be assumed with certainty that the first one or two pericopes of this manuscript (in which several passages can be pointed out that R. Baḥya (end of the 13th century) quotes from the Midrash Rabbah or from אלה הדברים רבה) belong to a Midrash that originally included the whole of Deuteronomy. What remained of that Midrash was combined in those codices with pericopes from Devarim Rabbah and Midrash Tanḥuma.

Among the numerous Midrashim to Deuteronomy there are known to be a number of fragments of a Devarim Zuta, the preservation of which is due to the author of Yalkut Shimoni.
