= Pesikta =

Pesikta (Jewish Babylonian Aramaic: פסיקתא) refers to a number of collections of rabbinic literature:

- Pesikta de-Rav Kahana, published in 1868 and 1962
- Pesikta Rabbati, composed around 845 CE
- The Pesikta Zutarta, also called Midrash Lekah Tov, by Tobiah ben Eliezer
