= Esther Rabbah =

Midrash to the Book of Esther

Esther Rabbah (Hebrew: אסתר רבה) is a midrash to the Book of Esther.

From its plan and scope, it is apparently an incomplete collection of the rich aggadic material which has been produced on the Book of Esther.

== Structure ==
Except in the Vilna and Warsaw editions with their modern and arbitrary divisions, this Midrash consists of six "parashiyyot" (chapters, sections; singular = "parashah") introduced by one or more proems. These chapters begin respectively at Esther 1:1, 1:4, 1:9, 1:13, 2:1, 2:5. In the Venice edition of 1545, each chapter has at the end the words "selika parashata..." This division was probably based on the sections of the Esther scroll, as indicated by the closed paragraphs (סתומות); such paragraphs existing in the present text to 1:9, 1:13, 1:16, 2:1, 2:5, etc. The beginning of 1:4, as well as the lack of a beginning to 1:16, may be due to differences in the division of the text. It may furthermore be assumed that a new parashah began with the section Esther 3:1, where several poems precede the comment of the midrash.

From Esther 3:1 onward, there is hardly a trace of further division into chapters. There is no new parashah even to Esther 4:1, the climax of the Biblical drama. As the division into parashiyot has not been carried out throughout the work, so too the running commentary to the Biblical text is much reduced in chapters 7–8, and is discontinued entirely at the end of chapters 8. The various paragraphs that follow chapter 8 seem to have been merely tacked on.

== Sources and dating ==
The Book of Esther early became the subject of discussion in the schoolhouses, as may be seen from Megillah 10b et seq., where long aggadic passages are joined to single verses. Esther Rabbah is variously connected with these passages. The author of Esther Rabbah often draws directly upon the Yerushalmi, Bereshit Rabbah, Wayikra Rabbah, Pirke De-Rabbi Eliezer, Targumim, and other ancient sources. Bereshit Rabbah or Vayikra Rabbah may also have furnished the long passage in parashah 1, in connection with the explanation of the first word (ויהי).

Parashah 6 shows several traces of a later period: especially remarkable here is the literal borrowing from Yosippon, where Mordechai's dream, Mordechai's and Esther's prayers, and the appearance of Mordechai and Esther before the king are recounted. However, these borrowings do not justify assigning to the midrash (as S. Buber does) a date later than Yosippon, such as the mid-10th century; for as early as Azariah dei Rossi they have been noted as later interpolations.

According to Strack & Stemberger (1991), the midrash may be considered to be composed of two different parts which were combined in the 12th or 13th century.

1. An older part characterized by non-anonymous proems, originating in Palestine around 500 CE, which draws material from Talmud Yerushalmi, Genesis Rabbah, and Leviticus Rabbah. This part is then itself cited in such works as Ecclesiastes Rabbah and Midrash Psalms.
2. A younger part drawing from Yosippon, which may be dated to the 11th century.

In any case, this midrash may be considered older and more original than the Midrash Abba Gorion to the Book of Esther. The Yalkut Shimoni quotes many passages from the latter midrash, as well as from another aggadic commentary. The midrash here considered is entitled "Midrash Megillat Esther" in the Venice edition. Nahmanides quotes it as the Haggadah to the Esther roll.

It may be assumed with certainty that it is of Judean origin.
