= Midrash Rabba =

Part of or the collective whole of aggadic midrashim on the books of the Tanakh

Midrash Rabba or Midrash Rabbah can refer to part of or the collective whole of specific aggadic midrashim on the books of the Torah and the Five Megillot, generally having the term "Rabbah" (רבה), meaning "great," as part of their name. These midrashim are as follows:

- Genesis Rabbah
- Exodus Rabbah
- Leviticus Rabbah
- Numbers Rabbah
- Deuteronomy Rabbah
- Song of Songs Midrash
- Ruth Rabbah
- Esther Rabbah
- Lamentations Rabbah
- Ecclesiastes Rabbah

The designation "Rabbah" was first applied to the midrash to Genesis, and then applied to the midrashim to the other books of the Pentateuch (Vayikra Rabbah, Shemot Rabbah, etc.) which were copied, with Bereshit Rabbah, even in (later) manuscripts. This collection eventually came to be called "Midrash Rabbot" (i.e., "Midrash of the Rabbot"), to which the midrashim most in use in connection with prayers—to Shir HaShirim, Ruth, Esther, Lamentations, and Ecclesiastes—were subsequently added.

Thus the Venice edition of 1545, in which the midrashim to the Pentateuch and to the Five Scrolls were for the first time printed together, has on the title-page of the first part the words "Midrash Rabbot 'al Hamishah Humshei Torah" (Midrash Rabbah to the Five Books of the Torah), and on that of the second part "Midrash Hamesh Megillot Rabbeta" (Midrash Rabbah of the Five Megillot). The editio princeps of the midrashim to the Pentateuch (Constantinople, 1512) begins with the words "Be-shem El atchil Bereshit Rabba" (In the name of God I shall begin Bereshit Rabbah), and the title of the editio princeps of the midrashim to the megillot (Pesaro, 1519) reads "Midrash Hamesh Megillot" (Midrash of the Five Megillot). Still more inexact and misleading is the term "Midrash Rabbah to the Five Books of the Pentateuch and the Five Megillot," as found on the title-page of the two parts in the much-used Vilna edition. After Zunz, it is not necessary to point out that the Midrash Rabbah consists of 10 entirely different midrashim.

== Manuscripts ==
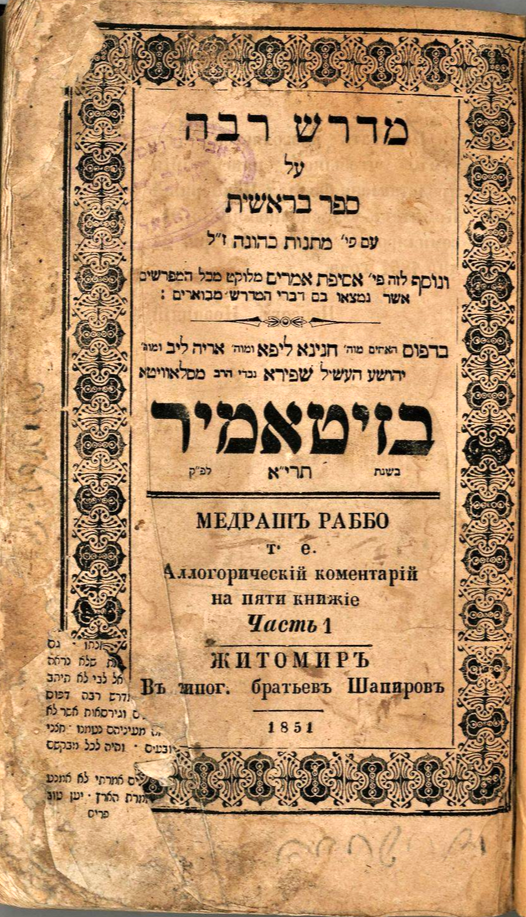
Midrash Rabba published by Shapiro Brothers

On the manuscript of the Bereshit Rabbah and some of the other rabbot to the Pentateuch, see Theodor. To these must be added the manuscript of Bereshit Rabbah in MSS. Orient. 40, No. 32, in the Landesbibliothek in Stuttgart. According to Solomon Schechter, there are not even six manuscripts of the rabbot to the Pentateuch and the Five Megillot in existence.
