= Tanhuma bar Abba =

Jewish amora

Tanhuma bar Abba (Hebrew: תנחומא בר אבא) was a Jewish amora of the 5th generation, one of the foremost aggadists of his time.

== Biography ==
He was a pupil of Ḥuna bar Abin, from whom he transmits halakhic as well as aggadic sayings. He received instruction also from Judah ben Shalom and R. Pinchas. According to W. Bacher, he resided in Nave, a town in Batanaea.

The Babylonian Talmud relates the following incident, probably based on an actual occurrence. The emperor (a Christian ruler no doubt being meant) said to Tanhuma, "Let us all become one people." To this the latter replied, "Yes; but since we are circumcised we cannot become like you; whereas you, by having yourself circumcised, may become like us." The emperor thereupon said, "You have answered me correctly; but he who worsts the king must be thrown to wild beasts." This was done, but the animals did Tanhuma no harm. An unbeliever who stood by remarked that perhaps they were not hungry, whereupon he himself was thrown after Tanhuma and was instantly torn to pieces.

With regard to Tanhuma's public activity, the only fact known is that he ordered a fast on account of a drought. Two fasts were held, but no rain came, whereupon Tanhuma ordered a third fast, saying in his sermon: "My children, be charitable to each other, and God will be merciful unto you." On this occasion one man gave money to his divorced wife, who was in need; Tanhuma thereupon lifted his face toward the heavens and prayed: "Lord of the Universe, this hard-hearted man took pity on his wife when he saw that she was in need, and helped her, although not obliged to do so; how much more should You, the Gracious and Merciful, be filled with pity when You see Your beloved children, the sons of Abraham, Isaac, and Jacob, in need." As soon as he had ceased praying, rain came, and the world was relieved of its distress.

== Teachings ==
Tanhuma is not often mentioned as a halakhist. A few remarks on and explanations of halakhic teachings are ascribed to him in the Jerusalem Talmud, while the Babylonian Talmud mentions an objection raised by him against a halakhic thesis advanced by the Judean schools.

As an aggadist, on the other hand, he is frequently mentioned, and the numerous aggadic teachings of his which are still preserved touch every province of the aggadah. He often points out the Scriptural bases for the sayings of older authors, always using the characteristic formula of introduction: "I give the reason"; that is, "I cite the Biblical authority". He also explains and annotates older sayings, adjusts differing traditions, and varies the text of old aggadic teachings. His own aggadic teachings differ but little from those of his contemporaries, although some of his interpretations approach the simple exegetic method. An example of this is furnished by his interpretation of Ecclesiastes 3:11, where he explains the word "ha-kol" as meaning "the universe".

Tanhuma often made use of symbolism to illustrate his thought. Some of his aggadic utterances may be quoted: "Just as the spice-box contains all kinds of fragrant spices, so must the wise youth be filled with all kinds of Biblical, mishnaic, halakhic, and aggadic knowledge". On Isaiah 45:3 Tanhuma said: "Nebuchadnezzar grudged his son and successor Evil-merodach his treasures, wherefore he filled iron ships with gold and sunk them in the Euphrates. When Cyrus conquered Babylonia and decided to rebuild the Temple in Jerusalem, he diverted the river into another channel, and 'the treasures of darkness, and hidden riches of secret places' were given to him".

Tanhuma often held religious disputations with non-Jewish scholars, especially Christians; and he himself tells of one which took place in Antioch. He was asked concerning Genesis 3:5, where the word "Ke-Elohim [yod'ei tov va-ra']" seems to point to a plurality of gods. Tanhuma replied that such a construction was refuted by the immediately preceding words, "yodea' [singular] Elohim." His frequent intercourse with non-Jews led him to formulate the following rule: "When a non-Jew greets you with a blessing, answer him with an 'Amen'".

The Pesikta Rabbati contains about eighty proems said to have originated with Tanhuma, and beginning with the phrase "Thus said R. Tanhuma." A great number of poems bearing his name are found also in the Midrash Tanhuma. In addition to these proems, several lengthy sections of the Pesikta Rabbati as well as of the Midrash Tanhuma are followed by the note "Thus explained [or "preached"] R. Tanhuma."

=== Quotes ===
- If you have acquired knowledge, what do you lack? but if you lack knowledge, what have you acquired?
