= Midrash =

Traditional Jewish exegesis of Biblical texts

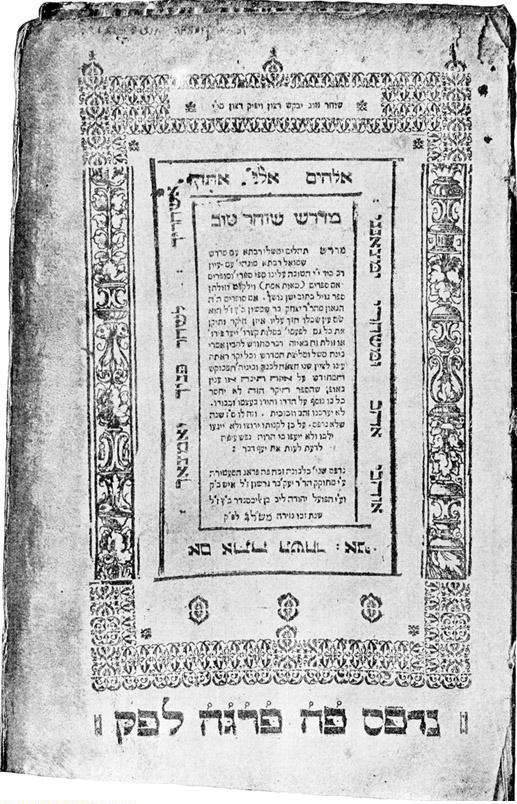
Title page, Midrash Tehillim

Midrash (/ˈmɪdrɑːʃ/; Hebrew: מִדְרָשׁ; pl. מִדְרָשִׁים midrashim or מִדְרָשׁוֹת midrashot) is a genre of Jewish Biblical exegesis, including Talmudic texts that use the classical rabbinic mode of homiletical interpretation (derash). The word itself means "textual interpretation", "study", or "exegesis", derived from the root verb darash (דָּרַשׁ), which means "resort to, seek, seek with care, enquire, require".

Midrash and rabbinic readings "discern value in texts, words, and letters, as potential revelatory spaces", writes the Hebrew scholar Wilda Gafney. "They reimagine dominant narratival readings while crafting new ones to stand alongside—not replace—former readings. Midrash also asks questions of the text; sometimes it provides answers, sometimes it leaves the reader to answer the questions". Vanessa Lovelace defines midrash as "a Jewish mode of interpretation that not only engages the words of the text, behind the text, and beyond the text, but also focuses on each letter, and the words left unsaid by each line".

An example of a midrashic interpretation:

"And God saw all that He had made, and found it very good. And there was evening, and there was morning, the sixth day." (Genesis 1:31)—Midrash: Rabbi Nahman said in Rabbi Samuel's name: "Behold, it was very good" refers to the Good Desire; "AND behold, it was very good" refers to the Evil Desire. Can then the Evil Desire be very good? That would be extraordinary! But without the Evil Desire, however, no man would build a house, take a wife and beget children; and thus said Solomon: "Again, I considered all labour and all excelling in work, that it is a man's rivalry with his neighbour." (Kohelet IV, 4).

The term Midrash is also used of a rabbinic work that interprets Scripture in that manner. Such works contain early interpretations and commentaries on the Written Torah and Oral Torah (spoken law and sermons), as well as non-legalistic rabbinic literature (aggadah) and occasionally Jewish religious laws (halakha), which usually form a running commentary on specific passages in the Hebrew Scripture (Tanakh).

The word Midrash, especially if capitalized, can refer to a specific compilation of these rabbinic writings composed between 400 and 1200 CE. According to Gary Porton and Jacob Neusner, midrash has three technical meanings:

1. Judaic biblical interpretation;
2. the method used in interpreting;
3. a collection of such interpretations.

== Etymology ==
The Hebrew word midrash is derived from the root of the verb darash (דָּרַשׁ), which means "resort to, seek, seek with care, enquire, require", forms of which appear frequently in the Bible.

The word midrash occurs twice in the Hebrew Bible: 2 Chronicles 13:22 "in the midrash of the prophet Iddo", and 24:27 "in the midrash of the book of the kings". Both the King James Version (KJV) and English Standard Version (ESV) translate the word as "story" in both instances; the Septuagint translates it as βιβλίον (book) in the first, as γραφή (writing) in the second. The meaning of the Hebrew word in these contexts is uncertain: it has been interpreted as referring to "a body of authoritative narratives, or interpretations thereof, concerning historically important figures" and seems to refer to a "book", perhaps even a "book of interpretation", which might make its use a foreshadowing of the technical sense that the rabbis later gave to the word.

Since the early Middle Ages the function of much of midrashic interpretation has been distinguished from that of peshat, straight or direct interpretation aiming at the original literal meaning of a scriptural text.

== As a genre ==
A definition of "midrash" repeatedly quoted by other scholars is that given by Gary G. Porton in 1981: "a type of literature, oral or written, which stands in direct relationship to a fixed, canonical text, considered to be the authoritative and revealed word of God by the midrashist and his audience, and in which this canonical text is explicitly cited or clearly alluded to".

Lieve M. Teugels, who would limit midrash to rabbinic literature, offered a definition of midrash as "rabbinic interpretation of Scripture that bears the lemmatic form", a definition that, unlike Porton's, has not been adopted by others. While some scholars agree with the limitation of the term "midrash" to rabbinic writings, others apply it also to certain Qumran writings, to parts of the New Testament, and of the Hebrew Bible (in particular the superscriptions of the Psalms, Deuteronomy, and Chronicles), and even modern compositions are called midrashim.

== As method ==
Midrash is now viewed more as method than genre, although the rabbinic midrashim do constitute a distinct literary genre. According to the Encyclopaedia Britannica, "Midrash was initially a philological method of interpreting the literal meaning of biblical texts. In time it developed into a sophisticated interpretive system that reconciled apparent biblical contradictions, established the scriptural basis of new laws, and enriched biblical content with new meaning. Midrashic creativity reached its peak in the schools of Rabbi Ishmael and Akiba, where two different hermeneutic methods were applied. The first was primarily logically oriented, making inferences based upon similarity of content and analogy. The second rested largely upon textual scrutiny, assuming that words and letters that seem superfluous teach something not openly stated in the text."

Many different exegetical methods are employed to derive deeper meaning from a text. This is not limited to the traditional thirteen textual tools attributed to the Tanna Rabbi Ishmael, which are used in the interpretation of halakha (Jewish law). The presence of words or letters which are seen to be apparently superfluous, and the chronology of events, parallel narratives or what are seen as other textual "anomalies" are often used as a springboard for interpretation of segments of Biblical text. In many cases, a handful of lines in the Biblical narrative may become a long philosophical discussion.

Jacob Neusner distinguishes three midrash processes:

1. paraphrase: recounting the content of the biblical text in different language that may change the sense;
2. prophecy: reading the text as an account of something happening or about to happen in the interpreter's time;
3. parable or allegory: indicating deeper meanings of the words of the text as speaking of something other than the superficial meaning of the words or of everyday reality, as when the love of man and woman in the Song of Songs is interpreted as referring to the love between God and Israel as in Isaiah 5. Similar systems were later adopted by other religions, such as Christianity, and applied to texts such as the New Testament.

== Jewish midrashic literature ==
Numerous Jewish midrashim previously preserved in manuscript form have been published in print, including those denominated as smaller or minor midrashim. Bernard H. Mehlman and Seth M. Limmer deprecate this usage, claiming that the term "minor" seems judgmental and "small" is inappropriate for midrashim, some of which are lengthy. They propose the term "medieval midrashim" instead, since the period of their production extended from the twilight of the rabbinic age to the dawn of the Age of Enlightenment.

Generally speaking, rabbinic midrashim either focuses on religious law and practice (halakha) or interprets the biblical narrative in relation to non-legal ethics or theology, creating homilies and parables based on the text. In the latter case, they are described as aggadic.

=== Halakhic midrashim ===
Midrash halakha is the name given to a group of tannaitic expositions on the first five books of the Hebrew Bible. These midrashim, written in Mishnaic Hebrew, clearly distinguish between the Biblical texts that they discuss and the rabbinic interpretation of that text. They often go beyond simple interpretation and derive or support halakha. This work is based on preset assumptions about the sacred and divine nature of the text and the belief in the legitimacy that accords with rabbinic interpretation.

Although this material treats the biblical texts as the authoritative word of God, it is clear that not all of the Hebrew Bible was fixed in its wording at this time, as some verses that are cited differ from the Masoretic, and accord with the Septuagint or Samaritan Torah instead.

=== Origins ===
With the growing canonization of the contents of the Hebrew Bible (both in terms of the books that it contained and the version of the text in them and an acceptance that new texts could not be added) there came a need to produce material that would clearly differentiate between that text and rabbinic interpretation of it. By collecting and compiling these thoughts, they could be presented in a manner that helped to refute claims that they were only human interpretations—the argument being that, by presenting the various collections of different schools of thought, each of which relied upon close study of the text, the growing difference between early biblical law and its later rabbinic interpretation could be reconciled.

=== Aggadic midrashim ===
Midrashim that seek to explain the non-legal portions of the Hebrew Bible are sometimes referred to as aggadah or Haggadah.

Aggadic discussions of the non-legal parts of scripture are characterized by a much greater freedom of exposition than the halakhic midrashim (midrashim on Jewish law). Aggadic expositors availed themselves of various techniques, including sayings of prominent rabbis. Midrash explores theology, ethics, stories, and moral lessons. These aggadic explanations could be philosophical or mystical disquisitions concerning angels, demons, paradise, Hell, the messiah, Satan, feasts and fasts, parables, legends, satirical assaults on those who practice idolatry, etc.

Some of these midrashim entail mystical teachings. The presentation is such that the midrash is a simple lesson to the uninitiated and a direct allusion, or analogy, to a mystical teaching for those educated in this area.

== Classical compilations ==
=== Tannaitic ===
- Alphabet of Rabbi Akiva. This book is a midrash on the names of the letters of the hebrew alphabet.
- Mekhilta. The Mekhilta essentially functions as a commentary on the Book of Exodus. There are two versions of this midrash collection. One is Mekhilta of Rabbi Ishmael, the other is Mekhilta of Rabbi Shimon ben Yochai. The former is still studied today, while the latter was used by many medieval Jewish authorities. While the latter (bar Yohai) text was popularly circulated in manuscript form from the 11th to 16th centuries, it was lost for all practical purposes until it was rediscovered and printed in the 19th century.
  - Mekhilta of Rabbi Ishmael. This is a halakhic commentary on Exodus, concentrating on the legal sections, from Exodus 12 to 35. It derives halakha from Biblical verses. This midrash collection was redacted into its final form around the 3rd or 4th century; its contents indicate that its sources are some of the oldest midrashim, dating back possibly to the time of Rabbi Akiva. The midrash on Exodus that was known to the Amoraim is not the same as our current mekhilta; their version was only the core of what later grew into the present form.
  - Mekhilta of Rabbi Shimon. Based on the same core material as Mekhilta de Rabbi Ishmael, it followed a second route of commentary and editing, and eventually emerged as a distinct work. The Mekhilta of Rabbi Shimon is an exegetical midrash on Exodus 3 to 35, and is very roughly dated to near the fourth century.
- Seder Olam Rabbah (or simply Seder Olam). Traditionally attributed to the Tanna Jose ben Halafta. This work covers topics from the creation of the universe to the construction of the Second Temple in Jerusalem.
- Sifra on Leviticus. The Sifra work follows the tradition of Rabbi with additions from the School of Rabbi Ishmael. References in the Talmud to the Sifra are ambiguous; It is uncertain whether the texts mentioned in the Talmud are to an earlier version of our Sifra, or to the sources that the Sifra also drew upon. References to the Sifra from the time of the early medieval rabbis (and after) are to the text extant today. The core of this text developed in the mid-3rd century as a critique and commentary of the Mishnah, although subsequent additions and editing went on for some time afterwards.
- Sifre on Numbers and Deuteronomy, going back mainly to the schools of the same two Rabbis. This work is mainly a halakhic midrash, yet includes a long haggadic piece in sections 78–106. References in the Talmud, and in the later Geonic literature, indicate that the original core of Sifre was on the Book of Numbers, Exodus and Deuteronomy. However, transmission of the text was imperfect, and by the Middle Ages, only the commentary on Numbers and Deuteronomy remained. The core material was redacted around the middle of the 3rd century.
- Sifri Zutta ("The small Sifre"). This work is a halakhic commentary on the book of Numbers. The text of this midrash is only partially preserved in medieval works, while other portions were discovered by Solomon Schechter in his research in the famed Cairo Geniza. It seems to be older than most other midrash, coming from the early third century.

=== Post-Talmudic ===
- Midrash Qohelet, on Ecclesiastes (probably before middle of 9th century).
- Midrash Esther, on Esther (940 CE).
- The Pesikta, a compilation of homilies on special Pentateuchal and Prophetic lessons (early 8th century), in two versions:
  - Pesikta Rabbati
  - Pesikta de-Rav Kahana
- Pirqe Rabbi Eliezer (not before 8th century), a midrashic narrative of the more important events of the Pentateuch.
- Tanchuma or Yelammedenu (9th century) on the whole Pentateuch; its homilies often consist of a halakhic introduction, followed by several poems, exposition of the opening verses, and the Messianic conclusion. There are actually a number of different Midrash Tanhuma collections. The two most important are Midrash Tanhuma Ha Nidpas, literally the published text. This is also sometimes referred to as Midrash Tanhuma Yelamdenu. The other is based on a manuscript published by Solomon Buber and is usually known as Midrash Tanhuma Buber, much to many students' confusion, this too is sometimes referred to as Midrash Tanhuma Yelamdenu. Although the first is the one most widely distributed today, when the medieval authors refer to Midrash Tanchuma, they usually mean the second.
- Midrash Shmuel, on the first two Books of Kings (I, II Samuel).
- Midrash Tehillim, on the Psalms.
- Midrash Mishlé, a commentary on the book of Proverbs.
- Yalkut Shimoni. A collection of midrash on the entire Hebrew Scriptures (Tanakh) containing both halakhic and aggadic midrash. It was compiled by Shimon ha-Darshan in the 13th century CE and is collected from over 50 other midrashic works.
- Midrash HaGadol (in English: the great midrash) (in Hebrew: מדרש הגדול) was written by Rabbi David Adani of Yemen (14th century). It is a compilation of aggadic midrashim on the Pentateuch taken from the two Talmuds and earlier Midrashim of Yemenite provenance.
- Tanna Devei Eliyahu. This work that stresses the reasons underlying the commandments, the importance of knowing Torah, prayer, and repentance, and the ethical and religious values that are learned through the Bible. It consists of two sections, Seder Eliyahu Rabbah and Seder Eliyahu Zuta. It is not a compilation but a uniform work with a single author.
- Midrash Tadshe (also called Baraita de-Rabbi Pinehas ben Yair):

=== Midrash Rabbah ===
- Midrash Rabba — widely studied are the Rabboth (great commentaries), a collection of ten midrashim on different books of the Bible (namely, the five books of the Torah and the Five Megillot). Although referred to collectively as the Midrash Rabbah, they are not a cohesive work, being written by different authors in different locales in different historical eras. The ones on Exodus, Leviticus, Numbers, and Deuteronomy are chiefly made up of homilies on the Scripture sections for the Sabbath or festival, while the others are rather exegetical.
  - Genesis Rabba, This text dates from the sixth century. A midrash on Genesis, it offers explanations of words and sentences and haggadic interpretations and expositions, many of which are only loosely tied to the text. It is often interlaced with maxims and parables. Its redactor drew upon earlier rabbinic sources, including the Mishnah, Tosefta, the halakhic midrashim the Targums. It apparently drew upon a version of Talmud Yerushalmi that resembles, yet was not identical to, the text that survived to present times. It was redacted sometime in the early fifth century.
  - Exodus Rabbah (tenth or eleventh and twelfth century)
  - Leviticus Rabbah (middle seventh century)
  - Numbers Rabbah (twelfth century)
  - Deuteronomy Rabbah (tenth century)
  - Shir HaShirim Rabbah (Song of Songs) (probably before the middle of ninth century)
  - Ruth Rabbah, (probably before the middle of ninth century)
  - Lamentations Rabbah, (seventh century). Lamentations Rabbah has been transmitted in two versions. One edition is represented by the first printed edition (at Pesaro in 1519); the other is the Salomon Buber edition, based on manuscript J.I.4 from the Biblioteca Casanatense in Rome. This latter version (Buber's) is quoted by the Shulkhan Arukh, as well as medieval Jewish authorities. It was probably redacted sometime in the fifth century.
  - Ecclesiastes Rabbah
  - Esther Rabbah

== Contemporary Jewish midrash ==
A wealth of literature and artwork has been created in the 20th and 21st centuries by people aspiring to create "contemporary midrash". Forms include poetry, prose, Bibliodrama (the acting out of Bible stories), murals, masks, and music, among others. The Institute for Contemporary Midrash was formed to facilitate these reinterpretations of sacred texts. The institute hosted several week-long intensives between 1995 and 2004, and published eight issues of Living Text: The Journal of Contemporary Midrash from 1997 to 2000.

== Contemporary views ==
According to Carol Bakhos, recent studies that use literary-critical tools to concentrate on the cultural and literary aspects of midrash have led to a rediscovery of the importance of these texts for finding insights into the rabbinic culture that created them. Midrash is increasingly seen as a literary and cultural construction, responsive to literary means of analysis.

Frank Kermode has written that midrash is an imaginative way of "updating, enhancing, augmenting, explaining, and justifying the sacred text". Because the Tanakh came to be seen as unintelligible or even offensive, midrash could be used as a means of rewriting it in a way that both makes it more acceptable to later ethical standards and conforms more to later notions of plausibility.

James L. Kugel, in The Bible as It Was (Cambridge, Massachusetts: Harvard University Press, 1997), examines a number of early Jewish and Christian texts that comment on, expand, or reinterpret passages from the first five books of the Tanakh between the third century BCE and the second century CE.

Kugel traces how and why biblical interpreters produced new meanings by the use of exegesis on ambiguities, syntactical details, unusual or awkward vocabulary, repetitions, etc. in the text. As an example, Kugel examines the different ways in which the biblical story that God's instructions are not to be found in heaven (Deuteronomy 30:12) has been interpreted. Baruch 3:29-4:1 states that this means that divine wisdom is not available anywhere other than in the Torah. Targum Neophyti (Deuteronomy 30:12) and b. Baba Metzia 59b claim that this text means that Torah is no longer hidden away, but has been given to humans who are then responsible for following it.

== See also ==
- Allegory in the Middle Ages
- Archetype
- Biblical studies
- Lectio Divina
- Icon
- Midrasz, a Polish-language journal on Polish Jewish matters
- Madrasa
- Pardes (exegesis)
- Semiotics
- Symbol
- Tafsir
- Typology
