= Ezra ben Isaac Fano =

Ezra ben Isaac Fano was Rabbi of Mantua and cabalist who lived in the 16th and 17th centuries. Fano was a pupil of the cabalist Israel Saruḳ, and among his own pupils were Menahem Azariah da Fano, Jacob the Levite, and Issachar Baer Eulenburg.

On 14 July 1591, Fano received the title of "Chief Rabbi Laureate of Mantua." He was the possessor of valuable manuscripts, some of which he edited and annotated. He published, under the title of Sefer Mishpeṭe Shebu'ot (Venice, 1602), a collection of small treatises by Hai Gaon. In conjunction with Meïr of Padua, he edited a manuscript of the Midrash Tanḥuma, adding a preface, an index, and three tables of practical decisions (Mantua, 1563). His decisions were published in Moses Porto's Palge Mayim (p. 28b) and in the collection entitled Mashbit Milḥamot (p. 32b). MS. No. 130 in the Codices Hebraic. Biblioth. I. B. de Rossi (Parma, 1803) contains a collection of letters written to Fano by Mordecai Dato and Joseph Ḥazaḳ (Cod. 130), and Joseph Gikatilla's Sefer ha-Oraḥ, with a description by Fano (Cod. 1228). Fano also wrote notes to many cabalistic works.

== Jewish Encyclopedia bibliography ==
- Zunz, in Kerem Ḥemed, vii.122;
- Graziadio Nepi-Mordecai Ghirondi, Toledot Gedole Yisrael, p. 282, 289;
- Marco Mortara, Indice, p. 21.
