= Samuel ben Jacob ibn Jam =

Rabbi

Samuel ben Jacob ibn Jam or Samuel ben Jacob Jam'a (Hebrew: שמואל בן יעקב אבן ג'אמע) was rabbi of the North-African community of קאבס (Gabès?) who flourished in the 12th century. He was on intimate terms with Abraham ibn Ezra, who dedicated to him his Ḥai ben Meḳiẓ and mentioned eulogiously three of his sons — Judah, Moses, and Jacob.

== Works ==
Under the title Elef ha-Magen, or, perhaps, Agur (the Hebrew equivalent of his Arabic name, Jamʿ), Samuel wrote a supplement to the Arukh of Nathan ben Jehiel, a dictionary and lexicography of Hebrew. Excerpts from this supplement, which is still extant in manuscript form, were published by Salomon Buber in the Grätz Jubelschrift. Samuel is believed to be identical to the author of the same name whose hiddush on tractate Sanhedrin are mentioned by Isaac ben Abba Mari of Marseille in his Sefer ha-'Ittur.

Two Arabic works contain the laws concerning the kosher slaughtering of animals, Risālat al-Burhān fī Tadhkiyat al-Ḥaywān (Arabic: رسالة البرهان‌ في تذكية الحيوآن, romanized: The message of proof in slaughtering animals) and on ethics, Kitab al-Zahdah lil-Muta'ammilin fi Yaqaẓat al-Mutaghaffilin, are also credited to him.

According to Leopold Dukes and other scholars, Samuel was the author also of the grammatical work Reshit ha-Leqaḥ, which is found in manuscript in the Vatican Library and Paris libraries, and which bears the name of Samuel ben Jacob. This, however, is denied by Moritz Steinschneider, who believes this grammar to have been written by another Samuel ben Jacob from a later time.
