= Samuel Mendelsohn =

Samuel Mendelsohn (1850–1922) was a Lithuanian Jewish rabbi and scholar born near Kaunas, Lithuania.

== Biography ==
He was educated at the rabbinical college in Vilnius, at the rabbinic school in Berlin, and at Maimonides College, Philadelphia, Pennsylvania. In 1883 he received the honorary degree of doctor of law from the University of North Carolina. Mendelsohn served as rabbi of the Congregation Beth-El, Norfolk, Virginia from 1873 to 1876; he then served as rabbi of the Congregation Temple of Israel, in Wilmington, North Carolina, until 1922.

Mendelsohn published The Criminal Jurisprudence of the Ancient Hebrews (Baltimore, 1891), in addition to several pamphlets and a large number of articles on subjects of general Jewish interest and Talmudical research, in Ha-Ẓofeh, the Jewish Messenger, Jewish Record, South Atlantic Magazine, American Israelite, and Revue des Etudes Juives. Dr. Mendelsohn was also a collaborator in the completion of the Jewish Encyclopedia.

In 1879, he married Esther Jastrow, niece of the Rev. Dr. Marcus Jastrow. He had one son, Charles Jastrow Mendelsohn; the latter was fellow in classics in the University of Pennsylvania (1901–1903), where he also received the degree of doctor of philosophy in 1904.

Rabbi Mendelsohn was active in a number of fraternal and charitable organizations, including the Cornelius Harnett Council, Royal Acanum, Odd Fellows, B’nai B’rith and the Fraternal Mystic Circle. He also served as supreme president of the U.S. Benevolent Franternity.
