= Lamentations Rabbah =

Midrashic commentary to the Book of Lamentations

The Midrash on Lamentations (Hebrew: אֵיכָה רבה, romanized: Ēkhā Rabbāh) is a midrashic commentary to the Book of Lamentations.

It is one of the oldest works of midrash, along with Genesis Rabbah and the Pesikta de-Rav Kahana.

== Names ==
The midrash is quoted, perhaps for the first time, by Chananel ben Chushiel under the name "Aggadat Eichah". Many passages are quoted by R. Nathan, who invariably calls the work Megillat Eichah. The term Eichah Rabbati, which is general even now, is used to designate the many extracts in Yalkut Shimoni which have been included with the other Biblical books. In Lamentations Rabbah itself, the sources are almost always missing. The names Midrash Eichah, Midrash Kinot, Megillat Kinot, are also found in the old authors. In Yalkut Shimoni, there are likewise long extracts from a Midrash on Lamentations published under the name Midrash Zutta.

== Date ==
According to Galit Hasan-Rokem, Lamentations Rabbah was composed in Roman Palestine "approximately in the middle of the first millennium C.E."

Leopold Zunz concluded that "the last sections were added later" and, furthermore, "that the completion of the whole work must not be placed before the second half of the seventh century", because the empire of the Arabians is referred to even in a passage of the first chapter. However, according to a reading of Salomon Buber's edition (which is the only correct one as shown by the context), Seir, not Ishmael, is mentioned in connection with Edom in this passage to 1:14. Zunz's other arguments likewise fail to prove such a late date for the Midrash, especially since Zunz himself concludes that the authorities mentioned therein by name are not later than the Jerusalem Talmud. All that can be definitely stated is that Lamentations Rabbah was edited after the completion of the Yerushalmi, and that Genesis Rabbah must also be considered as of earlier date, not so much because it was drawn upon, as because of the character of the proem collection in Lamentations Rabbah. Like Genesis Rabbah, Lamentations Rabbah is of Judean origin, and rich in foreign words, especially Koine Greek.

It certainly is not strange that the "Vive domine imperator!" with which Yohanan ben Zakkai is said to have approached Vespasian in his camp, should have been reproduced. The same phrase was likewise transmitted in Aramaic and Hebrew form, in Buber's edition and in the Arukh.

== Contents ==
The work begins with 36 consecutive proems forming a separate collection, certainly made by the author of the Midrash. They constitute more than one quarter of the work. These proems and, perhaps, most of the annotations, which are arranged in the sequence of the verses, originated in the discourses of which, in olden times, the Book of Lamentations had been the subject. The aggadic explanation of this book—which is a dirge on the destruction of the First and Second Temples and the national destruction that came along with it—was treated by scholars as especially appropriate to Tisha B'Av, to the day of the destruction of the Temple, and to the evening before Tisha B'Av.

=== The Proems ===
The sources from which Jerusalem Talmud drew must have been accessible to the author of Lamentations Rabbah, which was certainly edited some time after the completion of the former, and which probably borrowed from it. In the same way older collections must have served as the common source for Lamentations Rabbah, Genesis Rabbah, and especially for the Pesiqta de-Rab Kahana. The aggadic comment on Hosea 6:7 appears earlier as a proem to a discourse on Lamentations, and is included among the proems in this Midrash as a comment on Genesis 3:9. The close of this proem, which serves as a connecting link with Lamentations 1:1, is found also in the Pesiqta as the first proem to pericope 15 (p. 119a) to Isaiah 1:21, the Hafṭarah for the Sabbath before Tisha B'Av.

The same is the case with the second and fourth proems in the Pesiqta, which are identical with the fourth and third (according to the correct enumeration) of the proems to Lamentations Rabbah; the fifth in the Pesiqta (120b-121b), which corresponds to the second in this Midrash, has a defective ending. With a change in the final sentences, the first proem in Lamentations Rabbah is used as a proem in the Pesiqta pericope 11 (110a), and with a change of the proem text and of its close, proem 10 (9) of Lamentations Rabbah is found as a proem in the Pesiqta pericope 19 (137b).

On the other hand, there is found embodied in the exposition of Lamentations 1:2, "she weepeth sore in the night", etc., a whole proem, the text of which is Psalms 78:7 et seq., "I remember my lute-playing in the night", etc.; this proem contains also the final sentence which serves as introduction to the section Isaiah 49:14, and it is known from the Pesiqta pericope 17 to be a proem to a discourse on this section, which is intended for the second "consolatory Sabbath" after Tisha B'Av. From this, it becomes evident that the collector of the Lamentations Rabbah used the aggadic exposition—found in the Pesiqta fulfilling its original purpose—as a comment on Lamentations 1:2. The same is true of the commentary to Lamentations 1:21 for which there was used a proem on the Pesiqta section Isaiah 51:12, intended originally for the fourth Sabbath after Tisha B'Av, and a section which had for its text this verse of Lamentations (pericope 19, p. 138a); and also in regard to the comment to Lamentations 3:39, which consists of a proem of the Pesiqta pericope 18 (p. 130b).

But the author also added four proems from Lamentations Rabbah itself (29, 18, 19, 31, according to the correct enumeration), retaining the introductory formula ר ... פת, as a commentary to Lamentations 3:1,14,15; 4:12. The opinion set forth in the introduction to Buber's critical edition that the arrangement of the proems at the beginning of the work was made by a later editor, who included the marked comments of the Midrash as proems, and who, after prefixing the introductory formula to a comment on Ecclesiastes Rabbah 12:1 et seq., used it as a proem for Lamentations Rabbah 24 (23), is entirely wrong. There can be no doubt that precisely the opposite process has taken place. The entire interpretation in Ecclesiastes Rabbah 12:1-7, which consists of two versions, is composed of two proems—that in Leviticus Rabbah and the proem in this Midrash. The numberless proems originating in the synagogal discourses of the earliest times must be regarded as the richest source upon which the collectors of the midrashim could draw.

=== Running commentary and stories ===
In the part of Lamentations Rabbah which contains the running commentary to the Book of Lamentations, the character of interpretation is on the whole the same as in Genesis Rabbah. Side by side with the simple interpretation of sentences and words, and with various midrashic explanations dating from different authors (whose comments are placed in juxtaposition), the Midrash contains aggadic passages having some sort of relation to the verse. For example, in connection with the words "at the beginning of the watches" (Lamentations 2:19) is introduced the whole discussion of the Jerusalem Talmud on the statement of the Mishnah, "to the end of the first watch"; in connection with the words "let us lift up our heart with our hands to God in heaven" (3:41) is introduced a story from the Jerusalem Talmud Ta'anit 65a, telling how Abba bar Zabda preached on this verse during a fast-day service.

It is not strange that for similar expressions, such as "en lo ..." and "lo matz'ah manoah" occurring in Lamentations 1:2, 3, and Genesis 8:9, 11:30, Lamentations Rabbah uses the explanations of Genesis Rabbah 38 and 33, or that in the Lamentations Rabbah the same aggadah is found three times. For example, the same aggadah is used to explain the three passages Lamentations 1:1, 2:4, and 2:5, in each of which the word "like" occurs; the same comment is applied both to 3:53 and 3:56; a sentence of Shimon ben Lakish is used five times; and the explanation for reversing the order and putting the letter פ before ע is given twice.

Lamentations Rabbah comments on every verse in Lamentations, except a few verses in chapter 3. Its commentary often involves stories, some of them far longer than the verses of Lamentations they comment on. For example, the words "the populous city, the city great among the nations" in Lamentations 1:1 are vividly interpreted in the Midrash as referring to how the people of Jerusalem were "great in intelligence". This interpretation is then expounded by the telling of eleven stories in which Jerusalemites outwit Athenians. In the view of Galit Hasan-Rokem, Athenians are chosen for this purpose as they were themselves seen as paragons of wisdom; "by telling of the life of Jerusalem before the destruction, the stories recreate what has been lost, not only to enhance the pain of its absence but also to awaken joy at what once was". Several of the stories belong to folktale types attested widely in Eurasia, such as Aarne-Thompson tale-types AT 655 "The Wise Brothers", AT 655A "The Strayed Camel and the Clever Deductions". and AT 1533 "The Wise Carving of the Fowl".

To some verses (2:20, 3:51, 4:13,18,19) are added the stories to which they were referred, even though they are also found in the large collections on 2:2 and 1:16: "For these things I weep; mine eye, mine eye runneth down with water." These collections, as well as the long passage on 1:5 ("her enemies prosper"), giving so many accounts of the sufferings of Israel, including the times of the Temple in Jerusalem and the fateful Bar Kokhba revolt, are the most impressive in Lamentations Rabbah; they form an integral part of the work, like the interesting sagas and stories to on the greatness of the city of Jerusalem and the intelligence of her inhabitants.

In connection with "the sons of Zion, the splendid ones" (4:2), the Midrash tells of social and domestic customs. The stories of Lamentations Rabbah fill over fifteen columns of the Venice edition (about eleven in the first chapter), and include more than one-fourth of the midrashic comments (without the proems). Without these stories the differences in size of the several chapters would have been less apparent, even if (as was perhaps the case) the first chapter, in the form in which the author knew it, offered more opportunity for comments than did the other chapters.

== See also ==
- Gittin#Legends of Destruction
