= Salomon Buber =

Galician Jewish scholar and editor (1827–1906)

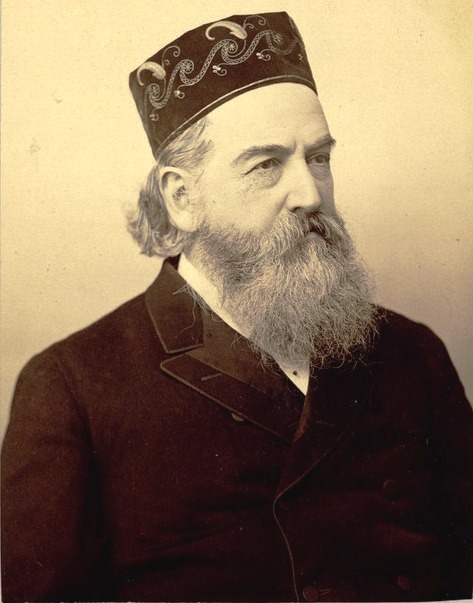
- Salomon Buber
- Born: February 2, 1827; Lemberg, Galicia, Austria
- Died: December 28, 1906 (aged 79); Lemberg, Galicia, Austria

Salomon (Note: Also spelled as Solomon.) Buber (Hebrew: שלמה בובר, romanized: Shlomo Buber; 2 February 1827 – 28 December 1906) was a Jewish Galician scholar and editor of Hebrew-language secular and religious works, especially Midrashic texts and medieval Jewish literature. Salomon Buber was the grandfather of Martin Buber, who was also a major scholar of Jewish texts, Jewish philosophy, and Kabbalah.

== Biographical data ==
Salomon Buber was born in Lemberg (then part of the Kingdom of Galicia and Lodomeria in the Austrian Empire; now Lviv, Ukraine) on February 2, 1827. His father, Isaiah Abraham Buber, was versed in Talmudic literature and Jewish philosophy. Isaiah was Salomon's teacher in Jewish philosophy, but for his son's biblical and Talmudic studies, he carefully selected competent professional teachers. Buber soon desired to conduct independent research and put the results in literary form—a disposition that proved valuable to Jewish literature.

At twenty years of age, Buber married and entered commercial pursuits. He rose rapidly to become Handelskammerrath (councilor of the chamber of commerce) and auditor of the Austro-Hungarian Bank and Galician savings bank. Buber was also president of the Geschäftshalle (business hall), vice-president of the free kitchen, and honorary member of a working men's union. For more than a quarter of a century, he was one of the directors of the Lemberg congregation; he was a member of the Bernstein foundation's committee and took a leading part in various philanthropic associations. He died in 1906.

== Midrash editions ==
While active in public life, Buber also devoted himself to learned research. The midrash literature had special attractions for him; and his activity in this field has been remarkable in extent. Its first result was an edition of the so-called Pesikta de-Rav Kahana, with an elaborate commentary and introduction that exhaustively discuss all questions pertaining to the history of this old Aggadah collection. The book appeared as a publication of the society known under the name of Mekitze Nirdamim (Lyck, 1868). Buber's method of dealing with the difficult undertaking was new to scientific literature; and both introduction and commentary received the unstinted praise of the scholarly world. The introduction was translated into German by August Wünsche, and published by him with his translation of the Midrash, Leipzig, 1884.

Other midrashic works edited on a similar method and scale by Buber are: collectanea from Midrash Abkir, Vienna, 1883; Tobiah ben Eliezer's Midrash Lekhach Tob, Wilna, 1880; the original Midrash Tanchuma, Wilna, 1885; collectanea from Midrash Eleh ha-Debarim Zutta, Vienna, 1885; Sifre d'Agadta, short midrashim on the Book of Esther, Wilna, 1886; Midrash Tehillim, Wilna, 1891; Midrash Mishle, Wilna, 1893; Midrash Shmuel, Kraków, 1893; Midrash Agada, an anonymous haggadic commentary on the Pentateuch, Vienna, 1894; Midrash Zuṭṭa, on the Song of Solomon, the Book of Ruth, Lamentations, and Ecclesiastes, Berlin, 1894; Aggadat Esther, haggadic treatises on the Book of Esther, anonymous, Kraków, 1897; Midrash Ekah Rabbati, Wilna, 1899; Yalkut Makiri, on the Psalms, Berdychev, 1899; Menahem ben Solomon's Midrash Sekel Tob, on the books of Genesis and Exodus, ii. vol. 2, Berlin, 1900-02.

== Method as editor ==
Buber was a prolific writer; yet the scientific quality of his work does not suffer on this account, at least in the opinion of his contemporaries. At the outset he adopted a certain system to which he consistently adhered. For a determination of the reading of the text he availed himself of all accessible manuscripts and printed works—and everything was accessible to him, as he spared no expense in obtaining copies of manuscripts and the rarest printed editions; he conscientiously recorded the various readings in footnotes, and he bestowed special care, chiefly in the older midrashim, on the correction and explanation of words in the text borrowed from the Greek and the Latin. In the introductions, which almost assume the proportions of independent works (the introduction to the Tanchuma embraces 212 pages octavo), everything that bears upon the history of the work under consideration is discussed, and a compilation is given of the authors or works cited by the Midrash or serving as sources for it, and those that in turn have drawn upon the Midrash. His work is distinguished by thoroughness, and reveals his synthetic ability as well as the vast extent of his reading. The only serious opposition to the views encountered by Buber has been in regard to his theory concerning the Tanchuma.

Buber distinguished himself in other departments of literature. His first work was a biography of the grammarian Elias Levita, published at Leipzig in 1856. After this he edited the following: De Lates' Gelehrtengeschichte Sha'are Zion, Jarosław, 1885; Zedekiah ben Abraham's liturgic work, Shibbole ha-Leket, Wilna, 1886; Pesher Dabar, Saadia Gaon's treatise on the Hapax Legomena of the Bible, Przemyśl, 1888; Samuel ben Jacob Jam'a's Agur, introduction and additions to the Arukh, Breslau, 1888 (in Grätz Jubelschrift); Samuel ben Nissim's commentary on the Book of Job, Ma'yan Gannim, Berlin, 1889; Biurim: Jedaiah Penini's explanations of Midrash Tehillim, Kraków, 1891, and a commentary on Lamentations by Joseph Caro, Breslau, 1901 (in the Kaufmann Gedenkbuch); Anshe Shem, biographies and epitaphs of the rabbis and heads of academies who lived and worked at Lemberg, covering a period of nearly four hundred years (1500-1890), Kraków, 1895. In these works Buber appears as a philologist and as a careful writer of biographies of scholars, especially of the Jewish scholars of Poland.

Buber's extensive knowledge of Jewish history and literature is also displayed in additions to the works of others and in numerous contributions to Hebrew magazines, such as: Meged Yerachin, Kobak's Jeschurun, Ha-Lebanon, Ha-Maggid, Maggid Mishneh, Ha-'Ibri, Ha-Melitz, Ha Chabatzelet, Ha-Karmel, Joseph Kohn's Otzar Chokmah, Bet Talmud, Ha-Shachar, Ha-Asif, Keneset Yisrael, Zion, Oẓar ha-Sifrut, Ha-Eshkol.

Among the works of his later years the following may be mentioned: Yeri'ot Shelomoh, a supplement to Abraham ben Elijah of Wilna's Rab Po'alim, Warsaw, 1894; a criticism of Yalḳuṭ Makhiri, on Isaiah, ed. Schapira, Kraków, 1895; a criticism of the Pesiḳta, with an introduction by David Luria (ed. Warsaw, 1893), Kraków, 1895; Ḳiryah Nisgabah, on the rabbis in Zółkiew up to the letter ך, published in Ha-Eshkol, i-iii, 1898–1900; and his contribution to the Steinschneider Festschrift, wherein he propounds a new theory concerning the Petichtot (Introductions) in Midrash Ekah Rabbati.

Buber corresponded on learned subjects with many well-known Jewish scholars. He proved himself a veritable Maecenas of learning. The cost involved in the publication of his works was usually borne by him, and he presented free copies to libraries and indigent scholars.

== Current assessment of Buber's scholarship ==
While Salomon Buber had a profound impact on the publication and study of the midrashic literature, there has been some reassessment of the quality of his work in light of more modern methodologies. Visotzky (2002) states that Buber's texts "are now largely considered defective on two counts." The first count is that Buber's methods are not consistent and rigorous by modern standards of scholarship, and the second count is that Buber's hired copyists often introduced their own copying errors into the works, thus partly negating Buber's efforts to establish a correct text. Many of the midrashic works that Buber first published now exist in (relatively) newer critical editions, which will generally be listed in modern reviews such as Strack & Stemberger (1991).

== Family ==
Salomon Buber was the grandfather and teacher of Martin Buber, who was raised partly at his grandfather's home in Lemberg.
