= Midrash Tehillim =

Aggadic midrash to the Psalms

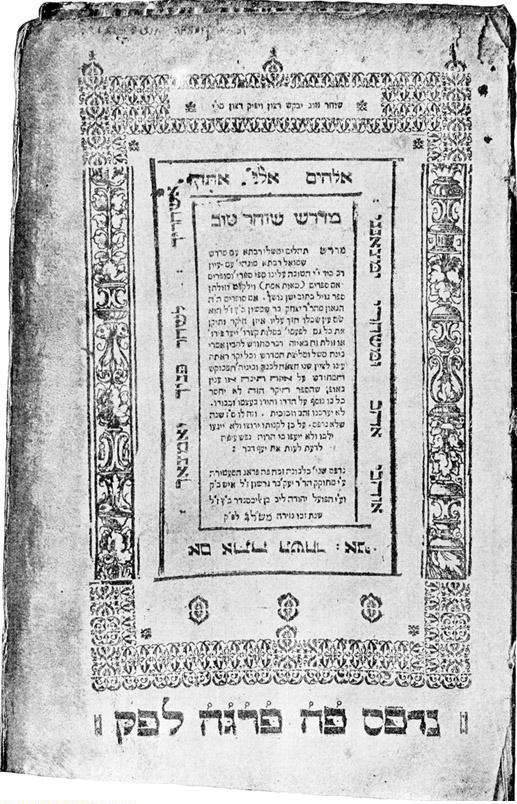
Title page of Midrash Tehillim (Prague, 1613)

Midrash Tehillim (Hebrew: מדרש תהלים), also known as Midrash Psalms or Midrash Shocher Tov, is an aggadic midrash to the Psalms.

Midrash Tehillim can be divided into two parts: the first covering Psalms 1–118, the second covering 119–150. The first (and earlier) part has much material dating back to the Talmudic period, although its final composition took place between the 7th and 9th centuries AD. The second part appears to have been compiled in 13th century.

It has been known since the 11th century, when it was quoted by Nathan of Rome, by R. Isaac ben Judah ibn Ghayyat, and by Rashi, who quoted it in his commentary on I Samuel 17:49, and on many other passages.

== Alternative names ==
The midrash has also been referred to as:

- Aggadat Tehillim
- Haggadat Tehillim
- Shocher Tov. This name began to be used in the 12th century. It comes from the verse Proverbs 11:27, "שחר טוב יבקש רצון ודרש רעה תבואנו". In addition, the Hebrew acronym for "Shocher Tov" (ש"ט) has been mistakenly expanded as "Shem Tov" or "Shem Tob", and the midrash referred to by that name.

== Composition ==
=== Authorship ===
The name of the editor and the date of the redaction of the true midrash (Psalms 1–118) cannot now be determined. The assumption that Rabbi Yohanan or Rav Simon, the son of R. Judah ha-Nasi, edited it cannot be substantiated. On the contrary, evidence shows that the midrash is not the work of a single editor. There are many passages containing the same thought. Substantially the same aggadot appear in different forms in different passages.

=== Date ===
Today, it is believed that the first part of Midrash Tehillim, covering Psalms 1–118, dates from the 7th to 9th centuries AD. The second, covering 119–150, was compiled in the 13th century.

The collection contains older material predating its compilation. When a midrash to the Psalms was undertaken together with the other midrashim, homilies and comments on single verses were collected from the most diverse sources, and were arranged together with the earlier aggadic material on the Psalms, following the sequence of the Psalms themselves. In the course of time this collection was supplemented and enlarged by the additions of various collections and editors, until the Midrash Tehillim finally took its present form.

=== Location of compilation ===
Leopold Zunz assigned its definitive completion to the last centuries of the period of the Geonim, without attempting to determine an exact date. But Zunz's assumption, that the midrash was compiled in Italy, cannot be accepted. The work was edited in Palestine, as appears from the language, style, and manner of aggadic interpretations. Nearly all the amoraim mentioned in it are Palestinian rabbis, and the few Babylonian amoraim referred to (e.g., R. Ḥida) are mentioned also in Yerushalmi.

=== Print editions ===
The true midrash covers only Psalms 1–118, and this is all that is found either in the manuscripts or in the first edition.

In the second edition, a supplement was added covering (with the exception of two psalms) Psalms 119–150. The author of this supplement was probably R. Mattithiah Yiẓhari of Zaragoza, who collected the scattered aggadot on Psalms 119-150 from the Yalkut Shimoni, adding comments of his own. Since Psalms 123 and 131 are not covered in Yalkut Shimoni, the author of the supplement included no aggadic interpretations on these two psalms.

S. Buber, in his very full edition of the Midrash Tehillim, printed material from other sources (the Pesiḳta Rabbati, Sifre, Numbers Rabbah, and the Babylonian Talmud) under the titles of the Psalms 123 and 131, so that the midrash in its present form covers the entire Book of Psalms.

== Contents ==
The midrash contains homilies on the Psalms, and comments on single verses and even on single words. The homilies are as a rule introduced with the formula "as Scripture says". In only a few cases are they introduced as in the other midrashim, with the formula "Rabbi N. N. has begun the discourse", or "Rabbi N. N. explains the Biblical passage". Among the comments on single verses are many which are based on the difference of Qere and Ketiv, as well as on the variant spellings of words (plene and defective). Many words, also, are explained according to the numerical value of the letters (gematria) or by analysis of their component parts (Noṭariḳon) as well as by the substitution of other vowels ("al-tiḳri"). The midrash is prone to interpreting numbers, contributing likewise thereby important observations on the number of the Psalms and of the sections of the Pentateuch as well as on the number of verses in various Psalms. Thus it enumerates 175 sections of the Pentateuch, 147 psalms, and nine verses in Psalms 20.

The midrash contains a number of stories, legends, parables, proverbs, and sentences, with many ethical and halakhic maxims. Notable stories include that of Remus and Romulus, to whom God sends a she-wolf to suckle, and the legend of Emperor Hadrian, who wished to measure the depth of the Adriatic Sea.

Among the proverbs which are found only in this midrash are:

- "Walls have ears" (i.e., care should be taken in disclosing secrets even in a locked room)
- "Woe to the living who prays to the dead; woe to the hero who has need of the weak; woe to the seeing who asks help of the blind; and woe to the century in which a woman is the leader."

Many customs can be traced to this midrash, e.g., that of not drinking any water on the Sabbath before the evening.
