= Midrash Tanhuma =

Different collections of Torah aggadot

Midrash Tanhuma (Hebrew: מִדְרָשׁ תַּנְחוּמָא, romanized: miḏraš tanḥumā), also known as Yelammedenu, is the name given to a homiletic midrash on the entire Torah, and it is known in several different versions or collections. Tanhuma bar Abba is not the author of the text but instead is a figure to whom traditions are frequently attributed to (indicated by the formula "Thus began R. Tanḥuma" or "Thus preached R. Tanḥuma"), though he may have preserved a collection of midrashim used by other midrash editors. The name Yelammedenu derives from the Hebrew phrase yelammedenu rabbenu, which initiates a typical textual unit in the text.

The earliest manuscript may be from the late 8th or 9th century. The most significant publication on the text so far was an edited volume of studies by Nikolsky and Atzmon from 2022.

== Recensions ==
There are many different recensions of Midrash Tanhuma, although the main ones are the standard printed edition, first published in Constantinople in 1520/1522 (and then again in Venice in 1545 and Mantua in 1563), and the Buber recension, published by Salomon Buber in 1885 based on the manuscript MS Oxford Neubauer 154 for the base text as well as four other Oxford manuscripts. One study collects the following list of recensions:

- Midrash Tanhuma in the standard printed edition
- Midrash Tanhuma, Buber Recension, published 1885
- Exodus Rabbah, Part II
- Numbers Rabbah, Part II
- Deuteronomy Rabbah in the standard printed edition
- Deuteronomy Rabbah, Lieberman edition
- Various Pesiqta-type material
- Over one hundred miscellaneous fragments

== Date and provenance ==
Previously, it was thought that the Tanhuma may be as late as the High Middle Ages and many favored a 10th-century date. However, no extensive research had then been done on the dating and provenance of the text, and so conclusions remain tentative.

Townsend believed the Buber recension relies on the mid-8th century Sheʾilot by R. Ahai of Shabba and so dates at least to the 9th century. On the other hand, Tzvi Meir Rabbinowitz has concluded that Yannai, who operated in Palestine prior to the Islamic conquests, made use of the two extant and one lost Tanhuma, and his findings suggest that a significant portion of the Tanhuma material can be dated as pre-Islamic. More recently, Marc Bregman posited that the shared material between the printed and Buber recensions originates from the sixth or seventh century in Palestine (which is also where Buber placed its location of origins). The Buber recension then originates from northern Italy in the time of the Lombards between 559 and 774. Finally, the formation of the printed edition is dated to after the Islamic conquests, although the collection was still completed prior to any impact of Islamic influence on Palestinian society, as Islamic influences are entirely absent from the text.

Some other scholars favor origins in southern Italy because (i) all manuscripts are European (ii) the presence of many Greek and Latin words which were typical in use of language in Italy (iii) an unlikelihood of stemming from northern Italy due to its misunderstanding of the geography of that region. On the other hand, Palestinian roots of the text are reflected by its use of Palestinian rabbinic traditions, including its familiarity with the Mishnah and the Jerusalem Talmud but not the Babylonian Talmud.

== Translations ==
The first English translation of the Buber recension of the Tanhuma was published by John Townsend in 1989. Then, in 1996, Samuel Berman published an English translation of the standard printed edition.

== Digital access ==
Tikkun-Sofrim, a system that integrates automatic handwritten text recognition with manual, crowdsourced error correction has been used to digitize several manuscripts of the Midrash Tanhuma.

== Standard edition/Yelammedenu ==
The standard published edition was known as the "Yelammedenu" from the opening words of the halakhic introductions to the homilies—Yelammedenu rabbenu. It is considered by many to be an amended edition of the Buber recension as well as a third now-lost version of Tanhuma. Its homilies on Genesis are original, although they contain several revised passages from the standard version as well as from the Yelammedenu, the Babylonian Talmud being largely drawn upon for additional interpretations and expositions. The part referring to Exodus is borrowed almost entirely from the Yelammedenu, with the exception of the Vayakhel and Pekudei sections, which contain homilies not embodied in the lost work. For the portions to the books of Leviticus, Numbers, and Deuteronomy the redactor of this midrash has made extensive use of the material that he found in the standard version, which he has revised and supplied with numerous additions.

The first authority to cite this midrash was Rashi. Because the third midrash contains much of the material of the lost Yelammedenu, the two works were often confounded. Some authorities believed that it was this version as opposed to the Yelammedenu which had been lost. Others erroneously considered this midrash identical with the Yelammedenu, thinking the work had a double title; and the first editions of this version appeared, therefore, under the title "Midrash Tanḥuma, Called Also the Yelammedenu."

The standard edition was first published at Constantinople in 1522, and was reprinted without emendation at Venice in 1545. The third edition, which served as a basis for all the later editions, was published at Mantua in 1563 by Meïr ben Abraham of Padua and Ezra ben Isaac Fano. This edition contains several additions, consisting of single sentences as well as of entire paragraphs, which Ezra ben Isaac selected from two of the original manuscripts and also from the Yalquṭ. Ezra indicated the added matter by marking it with open hands, but in the following editions these marks were omitted, so that it is no longer possible to distinguish between original contents and material added by revisers. Ezra of Fano further added to his edition an index of all halakhic decisions, as well as of the legends and parables contained in this midrash; this index has been retained in all later editions.

== Buber recension (TanB) ==
Tanhuma Buber, also called Tanhuma B, is the collection published by Salomon Buber, who gathered the material from several manuscripts. Buber claimed that this collection, consisting of homilies on and aggadic interpretations of the weekly sections of the Torah, was the oldest of the three, perhaps even the oldest compilation of its kind arranged as a running commentary on the Pentateuch, and he identified several passages which he saw as being quoted by Genesis Rabbah. Buber postulated that this midrash was edited in the fifth century, before the completion of the Babylonian Talmud. Buber cites a passage in the Babylonian Talmud that seems to indicate that the redactor of that work had referred to the Midrash Tanḥuma. Other scholars disagree, however, and do not see the Buber recension of Tanhuma as being older than the other versions. Townsend cites a section from Buber's recension which appears to be a quote from Ahai of Shabha's She'iltot (8th century).

This passage says that two amoraim differed in their interpretations of the words "and they looked after Moses, until he was gone into the tabernacle" One amora interpreted the words in a complimentary sense while the other held that the people looked after Moses and made unfavorable remarks about him. The favorable interpretation is given in the Talmud; the adverse opinion is referred to with the words "ki de-ita" (”as it is said”). Inasmuch as the adverse view is given in the Tanḥuma Pequḏe, it is probable that the words ki de-ita in the Talmud have reference to the former work, or that the reference originally read ki de-ita be-Tanḥuma ("as it is said in the Tanḥuma").

The homilies contained in Midrash Tanḥuma B begin with the words "As the Scriptures say" or sometimes "As it is written." Then follow a verse (in most cases taken from the Ketuvim), its explanation, and a homily on the particular passage of the Pentateuch referred to. Several of the homilies on the first, third, and fourth books of the Pentateuch begin with brief halakhic dissertations bearing on the passages to which the homilies refer. The halakhic treatises consist of a question introduced with the words Yelammedenu rabbenu "May our teacher instruct us", and of a reply beginning with the phrase "Kak shanu rabbotenu" (Thus have our teachers instructed us); the replies are always taken from either a mishnah or a baraita. Many of the homilies close with words of hope and encouragement regarding the future of the Jews; but several of them are abbreviated and not entirely completed, this curtailment being apologized for in the words "Much more might be said on this subject, but we shall not tire you", or "This passage has been elucidated by several other interpretations and expositions, but in order not to tire you we quote only that which is necessary for today's theme".

=== Contents ===
Although essentially an aggadic midrash, Tanḥuma A contains many halakhic sayings. In addition to its 61 introductions to homilies, which contain halakhic questions and answers, there are several halakhic rules and decisions quoted throughout the work. These halakhic passages were taken from the Mishnah or the baraita, and not from the Babylonian Talmud; indeed, many of the decisions given are in opposition to those of the latter work. The aggadic contents of the midrash are also very extensive and varied; it contains, too, simple explanations of scriptural passages; several refutations of heretics; explanations of the differences between "ḳere" and "ketib" and between words written "plene" ("male") and defectively ("ḥaser"); interpretations according to noṭariḳon and gematria; several narratives and parables; and numerous aphorisms, moral sayings, and popular proverbs.

Some of the aphorisms and proverbs may be cited here: "One may not give an honest man an opportunity to steal, much less a thief". "The office seeks those that would escape it". "If you yield not to wickedness, it will not follow you nor dwell by you". "Do the wicked no good, in order that thou reap not that which is evil".

This Tanḥuma midrash has been referred to in many other midrashim, as, for example, all the Midrash Rabbot, Pesiḳta de-Rab Kahana, Pesikta Rabbati, and in the midrashim to Book of Samuel, Proverbs, and Psalms, which all quote passages from it. The Geonim also and the older rabbinical authorities made use of it, and cited halakhic as well as aggadic sentences from it. The first to refer to this midrash by the name of "Tanḥuma", however, was Rashi, who mentions it in several passages of his commentary, and quotes from it. Most of Rashi's quotations are taken from Tanḥuma B.

== Lost version attributed to R. Tanhuma ==
This version is lost and largely known through later quotations. Only a few authorities, like Hai ben Sherira and Zedekiah ben Abraham Anaw, know it under the name "Tanhuma". This confusion may be because the standard version included a significant portion of this text into it. Several rabbinic authorities have also referred to it by the name "Aruk".
