= Shir HaShirim Rabbah =

Aggadic midrash on the Song of Songs

Shir ha-Shirim Rabbah (Hebrew: שיר השירים רבה) is an aggadic midrash on Song of Songs, quoted by Rashi under the title "Midrash Shir ha-Shirim". It is also called Aggadat Hazita, from its initial word "Hazita", or Midrash Hazita.

== Origins ==
Simon Duran, in quoting this midrash, says that it is a Judean aggadic collection. The sources which it uses directly are from the Jerusalem Talmud. No direct borrowing from the Babylonian Talmud appears, and, although it contains many interpretations and comments found in the Babylonian Talmud, most of them vary greatly in form, the agreement being confined to their contents. This agreement, moreover, may be explained on the ground that the comments and interpretations in question are very old, and were included both in the Babylonian Talmud and in the Palestinian sources used by the redactor of Shir haShirim Rabbah.

== Theories on composition and dating ==
The date of composition of this midrash cannot be exactly determined. Song of Songs was interpreted aggadically at a very early time, and certain rules for this aggadic interpretation were formulated: for example, the rule adopted by Judah ben Ilai, and the rule (in Shevuot 35b) for the interpretation of the name for Solomon used in Song of Songs. Upon these rules are based the interpretations of the verses of Song of Songs which appear in the Seder Olam Rabbah, in the Sifra, and (particularly frequently) in the Sifre and the Mekhilta, as well as in the Talmud, which has an exegesis for almost every verse of the book. Most interpretations in the Talmud were taken from public lectures on Song of Songs, or from various aggadah collections. Some scholars, moreover, have assumed a direct connection between such ancient discourses and the present Shir haShirim Rabbah, regarding this midrash as an old collection of these discourses, increased by various later additions.

=== A combined work ===
Jellinek thinks that there were several aggadic midrashim to Song of Songs, each of which interpreted the book differently, one referring it to the exodus from Egypt, another to the revelations on Mount Sinai, and a third to the Tabernacle or the Temple in Jerusalem; and that all these midrashim were then combined into one work, which (with various additions) forms the present Shir ha-Shirim Rabbah. According to Jellinek, this midrash is older than the Pesikta de-Rav Kahana, which (he holds) has borrowed entire passages from it. Theodor has shown, however, that it was composed at a later date than the Pesikta de-Rav Kahana, from which it has borrowed entire passages. The author of Shir ha-Shirim Rabbah, intending to compile a running midrash on Song of Songs, took the comments on the several verses from the sources which he had at hand, and the changes and transpositions which he made are similar to those made by the redactor of the Yalkut Shimoni; in fact the midrash is similar in many ways to a "yalkut". This method of redaction explains the great difference in the length and the character of the several comments, and it explains also the fact that the same comments are repeated two or three times for the same or similar verses.

=== Evidence from parallel sources ===
Besides the Jerusalem Talmud (which was the chief source) and the Pesikta de-Rav Kahana, the direct sources used by the redactor are Genesis Rabbah and Leviticus Rabbah. The material borrowed from these sources constitutes a large part of the midrash, and it throws a light also on the redactor's method. The remainder of the midrash must have originated in midrashic collections which are no longer extant, and from which the redactor borrowed all the comments that are found also in the Seder Olam Rabbah, the Sifra, the Sifre, and the Mekhilta, since it is improbable that he borrowed from these earlier midrashim. The midrash is older than Pesikta Rabbati, since the latter borrowed passages directly from it. As the Pesikta Rabbati was composed about 845 C.E., Shir ha-Shirim Rabbah must have been composed about the end of the 8th century.

== Publication ==
The midrash has been edited and commented together with the other Midrash Rabbot, and has been edited separately and supplied with a commentary, entitled Kanfe Yonah by Baruch Etelsohn.
