= Pesikta de-Rav Kahana =

Collection of Aggadic Midrash which exists in two editions

Pesikta de-Rav Kahana (Jewish Babylonian Aramaic: פסיקתא דרב כהנא) is a collection of aggadic midrash which exists in two editions, those of Salomon Buber (Lyck, 1868) and Bernard Mandelbaum (1962). It is cited by Nathan ben Jehiel and Rashi.

== The name ==
The Jewish Babylonian Aramaic term psiqtā ('section') is cognate to the Hebrew פָּסוּק (pāsuq, 'verse'). The appearance of the name of Rav Kahana in the title (in manuscripts as early as the 11th century) is explained in two ways:

- Leopold Zunz and Buber consider the title to be due to the phrase "Rav Abba bar Kahana Patah," which opens the longest section of the work, for the Shabbat preceding the Seventeenth of Tammuz.
- B. Mandelbaum considers the appearance in two manuscripts of the name "Rav Kahana" at the beginning of the Rosh Hashanah chapter—which may have been initially the first chapter—as the more likely explanation for the use of his name in the title of the work. The position of the Rosh Hashana section as the first psiqtā is also attested by the Arukh of Nathan ben Jehiel.

It is unclear, in any case, which Rav Kahana is referred to since the six known individuals bearing that name all lived in Lower Mesopotamia (Babylonia), while the Pesikta de-Rav Kahana was probably composed in ancient Israel.

== Organization ==
It consists of 33 (or 34) homilies on the lessons forming the Pesikta cycle: the Pentateuchal lessons for special Shabbats (1-6) and for the festivals (7-12, 23, 27-32), the prophetic lessons for the Shabbats of mourning and comforting (13-22), and the penitential sections "Dirshu" and "Shuvah" (24, 25; No. 26 is a homily entitled "Seliḥot").

According to the arrangement in this edition, the homilies fall into three groups of pesaqot: (Hebrew: פְּסָקוֹת, romanized: pəsāqoṯ discourses [on the lessons], singular pisqā פסקה): Pentateuchal, Prophetic, and Tishri. An unnumbered other pesaqot to Isaiah 61:10 (following two manuscripts) is printed after No. 22; similarly, No. 29 (following a manuscript) is designated with No. 28 as another pisqa for Sukkot, and the pisqa on pp. 194b et seq. (recognizable as spurious by the halakhic exordium, and also printed following a manuscript) is designated with No. 30 as another version of the pisqa for parasha Shemini. Pesaqot 12 and 32 each consist of two homilies, but the second homily in No. 27 (pp. 174b et seq.) does not belong to the Pesikta.

The various manuscripts differ not only concerning the above-mentioned second pesaqot and other, longer passages but also concerning the arrangement of the entire collection, which began in a manuscript that is defective at the beginning, with the homilies to prophetical lessons Nos. 13-22 and 24–25. An old abbreviation designates these twelve homilies: דש״ח נו״ע אר״ק שד״ש. Another manuscript, "Haftarah Midrash," contains only these homilies, except next to the last one. Entire homilies of the Pesikta have been taken over, or sometimes worked over, into the Pesikta Rabbati; there are also several Pesikta homilies in the Midrash Tanhuma.

Leviticus Rabbah also contains some of the homilies found in Pesikta. The parashiyyot 20, 27–30 in Leviticus Rabbah are, except for a few differences, the same as pesaqot 27, 9, 8, 23, 28 of the Pesikta. Leopold Zunz states that the Pesikta depends on Leviticus Rabbah, assigning this midrash to the middle of the 7th century, but the Pesikta to the year 700. Weiss, while emphasizing still more strongly the dependence of the Pesikta on Leviticus Rabbah, takes it to be nearly as old as Genesis Rabbah; he thinks that the Pesikta took for its sources Genesis Rabbah, Leviticus Rabbah, Lamentations Rabbah, and Song of Songs Rabbah. However, other authorities regard the Pesikta as the earliest midrash collection.

== Dating ==
The core of the Pesikta is old and must be classed together with Genesis Rabbah and Lamentations Rabbah. But the proems in the Pesikta, developed from short introductions to the exposition of the scripture into more independent homiletic structures, as well as the mastery of form apparent in the final formulas of the proems, indicate that the Pesikta belongs to a higher stage of midrashic development. The text of the current Pesikta was probably not finally fixed until its first printing, presumably in Salomon Buber's edition. Zunz gives a date of composition of 700 CE, but other factors argue for a date of composition in the 5th or early 6th century.

The nature of certain Pentateuch lessons, intended apparently for the second feast days celebrated in the Jewish Diaspora, still calls for investigation. The question also arises as to the time at which the cycle of the twelve prophetic lessons designated by דש"ח, etc., came into use; this cycle is not mentioned in Talmudic times but is subsequently stated to have been ordained or prescribed in the Pesikta.
