= Leviticus Rabbah =

Midrash interpreting the Book of Leviticus

Leviticus Rabbah, Vayikrah Rabbah, or Wayiqra Rabbah is a homiletic midrash to the Biblical book of Leviticus (Vayikrah in Hebrew). It is referred to by Nathan ben Jehiel (c. 1035–1106) in his Arukh as well as by Rashi (1040–1105). According to Leopold Zunz, Hai Gaon (939-1038) and Nissim knew and made use of it. Zunz dates it to the middle of the 7th century, but The Encyclopaedia Judaica and Jacob Neusner date it to the 5th century. It originated in the Land of Israel, and is composed largely of older works. Its redactor made use of Genesis Rabbah, Pesikta de-Rav Kahana, and the Jerusalem Talmud, in addition to other ancient sources. The redactor appears to have referred also to the Babylonian Talmud, using several expressions in the sense in which only that work employs them.

== Contents ==
Leviticus Rabbah is not a continuous, explanatory interpretation to Leviticus, but a collection of exclusive sermons or lectures on the themes or texts of that book. It consists altogether of 37 such homilies, each of which constitutes a separate chapter. Leviticus Rabbah often refers to Scriptural passages on which the homilies are based as "parshiyot," and are further designated according to their contents.

Of the 37 homilies, eight (1, 3, 8, 11, 13, 20, 26, 30) are introduced with the formula "Patach R." or "The teacher has commenced"; eight (2, 4–7, 9, 10, 19), with "Hada hu dich'tiv" or "As it is written"; and 21 (12, 14–18, 21–25, 27–29, 31–37), with "Zeh she-amar ha-katuv" or "This is what the Holy Scriptures say."

Weiss explains that the redactor selected only these 37 texts for his exposition as indicating the prior existence of the Sifra, the legal interpretation of Leviticus: "The redactor of the Vayikra Rabbah had nothing to add to the [Sifra]; he collected therefore only those haggadic explanations which he found on various texts and passages." This surmise by Weiss is, however, contradicted by the fact that nearly all the chapters of Leviticus Rabbah (with the exception of chapters 11, 24, 32, 35, and 36) refer to legal passages. Thus, the redactor of Leviticus Rabbah collected homiletic expositions also of such texts as were treated in the Sifra. The conjecture of Theodor that in the older cycle of weekly lessons the passages on which the homilies of Leviticus Rabbah were based consisted in certain paragraphs, or in lessons for certain festivals, seems therefore to be correct.

The length of Leviticus Rabbah is the same as that of the edition quoted by Nathan ben Jehiel in the Arukh, since he refers to passages from chapters 36 and 37 as "the end." Aside from some transpositions, eliminations, and glosses, the printed text of Leviticus Rabbah is noteworthy as containing, at the end of the first three chapters, annotations from Tanna debe Eliyahu which were not contained in the older manuscripts.

== Comparison to the Pesikta ==
In its plan, as well as in the form of the several chapters, Leviticus Rabbah bears great resemblance to the Pesikta de-Rav Kahana. Like the lectures in the Pesikta, the homilies in Leviticus Rabbah begin with a larger or smaller number of poems on passages mostly taken from the Writings. Then follows the exposition proper of the passage to which the homily refers. The explanation often covers only a few verses, or even a few words of the first verse, of the passage on which the parashah is based. In some cases, long pieces, in others brief sentences only, have been adduced in connection with the Scriptural passages, seemingly in accordance with the material at the redactor's disposal.

Inasmuch, however, as the homilies in Leviticus Rabbah deal largely with topics beyond the subject matter of the Biblical text itself, the explanations of the individual verses are often replaced by series of homiletic quotations that refer to the theme considered in the homily. In this, Leviticus Rabbah differs from the Pesikta, for in the Pesikta the individual explanations are seldom lacking. And while the Pesikta rarely quotes lengthy homiletic excerpts after the proems, Leviticus Rabbah quotes such materials after the conclusion of a proem, in the course of each chapter, and even toward the end of a chapter. These excerpts often have minimal relation to the context. But otherwise, Leviticus Rabbah carefully follows the form of the Pesikta. The end of each chapter in Leviticus Rabbah, like the Pesikta, consists of a passage containing a Messianic prophecy.
