= Preface =

Introduction to a book or other literary work by the author

A preface (/ˈprɛfəs/) or proem (/ˈproʊɛm/) is an introduction to a book or other literary work written by the work's author. An introductory essay written by a different person is a foreword and precedes an author's preface. The preface often closes with acknowledgments of those who assisted in the literary work.

It often covers the story of how the book came into being, or how the idea for the book was developed; this may be followed by thanks and acknowledgments to people who were helpful to the author during the time of writing.

A preface is often signed (and the date and place of writing often follow the typeset signature); a foreword by another person is always signed. Information essential to the main text is generally placed in a set of explanatory notes, or perhaps in an "Introduction" that may be paginated with Arabic numerals, rather than in the preface. The term preface can also mean any preliminary or introductory statement. It is sometimes abbreviated pref.

Preface comes from Latin, meaning either "spoken before" (prae and fatia) or "made before" (prae + factum). While the former source of the word could have preface meaning the same as prologue, the latter strongly implies an introduction written before the body of the book. With this meaning of stated intention, British publishing up to at least the middle of the twentieth century distinguished between preface and introduction.

It has been argued that there can be a "delusion of prefacing" ("Wahn der Bevorwortung" in German, "follia prefatoria" in Italian): Authors sometimes believe they can tell in advance all that is necessary to understand a book, while in fact only the book itself can fulfill that purpose.

== See also ==
- Abstract (legal)
- Abstract (summary)
- Epigraph
- Exordium
- Foreword
- Introduction
- Postface
- Preamble
- Prologue
