= Genesis Rabbah =

Midrash interpreting the Book of Genesis

Genesis Rabbah (Hebrew: בְּרֵאשִׁית רַבָּה, romanized: Bərēšīṯ Rabbā, also known as Bereshit Rabbah and abbreviated as GenR) is a religious text from Judaism's classical period, probably written between 300 and 500 CE with some later additions. It is an expository midrash comprising a collection of ancient rabbinical homiletical interpretations of the Book of Genesis, the first book of the Torah. Jewish tradition attributes its authorship to Hoshaiah Rabbah in the period of the Amoraim, flourishing in 3rd century Roman-ruled Syria Palaestina, but modern scholarship on its authorship remains inconclusive. The midrash forms an aggadic commentary on Genesis, in keeping with the midrashic exegesis of that age. In a continuous sequence, broken only toward the end, the biblical text is expounded, verse for verse, often word for word. Only genealogic passages and passages that furnish no material for exposition (as the reiterated account of Abraham's servant in 24:35-48) are omitted.

== Name ==
The name Genesis or Bereshit Rabbah for the text is attested in the Halakhot Genesis, The Arukh of Nathan ben Jehiel (d. 1006), and other documents.

Scholars debate the origins of its title. Some contend it was a shortened version of an earlier title Bereshit de R. Oshayah Rabbah ("Genesis of Rabbi Oshaya Rabbah"). This name was based on "R. Oshaya Rabbah took up the text…" (GenR 1:1). "R. Oshaya" was eventually dropped, leaving Genesis Rabbah ("The Great Genesis") as the full name of the text. Other scholars argue that its title ("The Great Genesis") is to distinguish it from a speculative smaller volume that may have once existed.

== Composition ==
=== Language ===
The language of the Genesis Rabbah is very similar to the language of the Jerusalem Talmud. It is largely Mishnaic Hebrew with the occasional appearance of Galilean Aramaic.

=== Date ===
The Genesis Rabbah is generally dated to the 5th century. At the lower end, the Genesis Rabbah mentions rabbis living in Palestine and Lower Mesopotamia from 300–400. Furthermore, the text mentions Diocletian (GenR 63.8), who reigned as Roman emperor from 284 to 305. However, no additional evidence is available to date the text after 400, including the fact that none of the rabbis it names lived after this time, nor does the text mention any events that took place afterwards. Genesis Rabbah is familiar with some content from the Jerusalem Talmud but this material appears to predate the final closure of that text, indicating that the two texts are roughly contemporary. Strack and Stemberger conclude that the text was composed between 400 and 450. Elbaum dates the text to the early fifth century. Recently, Woolstenhulme also favors the 5th century as the date of the final redaction, while suggesting that some of its material is even older.

The work was used later by Leviticus Rabbah and Lamentations Rabbah, but was first explicitly cited by the Halachot Gedolot.

=== Authorship ===
The content of Genesis Rabbah was not created by a single author, but was instead an organized compilation of various oral traditions. Some of those traditions are ascribed to a particular transmitter within the text itself. It is clear that the content comes from rabbis of the amoraic period, and Jewish tradition attributes Genesis Rabbah's authorship to Hoshaiah Rabbah, but specific authors or editors are disputed among contemporary scholars.

=== Later expansions ===
A number of specific passages (chs. 75, 84, 88, 91, 93, 95ff) have been identified as later additions/expansions to the work on the basis that their language, style, and form of exegesis does not match the rest of the text and their varying appearance in manuscripts of the work.

=== Manuscripts ===
The standard manuscript of Genesis Rabbah is found in the Codex Add. 27,169 of the British Museum. It was used for the critical edition issued by J. Theodor. Another manuscript, known as Vatican 30, rivals the British Museum manuscript in quality and scholars such as Michael Sokoloff argue for its superiority.

== Content and structure ==
=== Content ===
Genesis Rabbah contains many simple explanations of words and sentences, often in Late Aramaic, suitable for instructing youth. It also includes varied aggadic expositions popular in the public lectures of the synagogues and schools. The editor of the midrash has strung together various longer or shorter explanations and aggadic interpretations of the successive passages, sometimes anonymously, sometimes citing the author. The editor adds to the running commentary longer aggadic disquisitions or narratives, connected in some way with the verse in question or with one of the explanations of it—a method not unusual in the Talmud and other midrashim.

The Genesis creation narrative furnished vibrant material for this mode of exegesis. Whole sections are devoted to comments on one or two text verses. Many references to contemporary philosophical thought are made to refute the opinions of nonbelievers. References to contemporaneous conditions and historical events also occur. It is characteristic of the midrash to view the personages and conditions of the Bible in the light of the contemporary history of the time.

Though the stories embraced in Genesis furnish little occasion for comments on halakha, Genesis Rabbah contains a few short sentences and quotations taken from the Mishnah and other sources. Its midrash contains philosophical dialogue, expansions on close textual readings, parables, and foreign words, especially Roman-era Greek.

=== Form ===
This extensive and important midrash forms a complete commentary on Genesis and exemplifies all points of midrashic exegesis. It is divided into sections headed by prefaces. It is by these means distinguished from the tannaitic midrashim to the other books of the Torah, such as the Mekhilta, Sifra, and Sifre. Every chapter of the Genesis Rabbah is headed by the first verse of the passage to be explained. With few exceptions, it is introduced by one or more prefatory remarks starting from a verse taken from another biblical passage as text, generally from the Ketuvim. Through various explanations of these texts, a transition is made to the exposition of the particular verse of Genesis heading the section. There are about 230 of these passages in the Genesis Rabbah. About 70 are cited with the name of the Rabbi with whom they originated or whose explanation of the verse in question was used to introduce the section of the Genesis Rabbah.

=== Introductory passages ===
Most of these passages are anonymous and may perhaps be ascribed in part to the author of Genesis Rabbah. They begin with the verse of the text, which often stands at the head of the proem without any formula of introduction. The structure of the prefatory passages varies. In some, only the introductory text is given, its application to the verse of Genesis to be expounded being self-evident or being left to a later working out. The single prefaces, of which there is a large number, contain explanations of their text which refer entirely or in its last part to the verse or passage of Genesis to be expounded in that section. The composite introductions consist of different expositions of the same biblical verse, by different aggadists, strung together in various ways, but always arranged so that the last exposition—the last link of the introduction—leads to the exposition of the passage of Genesis, with the first verse of which the introductions often close.

For these introductions, which are often quite lengthy, the material for the several expositions was ready at hand. The original work on these passages consisted principally in the combining and grouping of the several sentences and expositions into a coordinate whole, arranged so that the last member forms the actual introduction to the exposition of the section. Definitely characterized as they are in their beginning by these introductions, the sections of Genesis Rabbah have no formal ending, although several show a transition to the biblical passage that is expounded in the following section.

=== The principle of division ===
In the manuscripts, as well as in the editions, the sections are consecutively numbered. Many quotations in the Shulchan Aruch mention the passage of Genesis Rabbah by the number of the section. The total number of the sections, both in the manuscripts and in the editions, varies from 97 to 101. Nearly all the manuscripts and editions agree in counting 96 chapters. The principle of division followed in the sections of Genesis Rabbah was evidently that of the biblical text itself as fixed at the time of the compilation of this midrash, in accordance with the open and closed paragraphs (פתוחות and סתומות) in the Hebrew text of Genesis. There are separate sections in the midrash for almost all these sections as they are still found in Genesis, with the exception of the genealogical passages. But there are sections that bear evidences of relation to the Torah portions ("sedarim") of the Palestinian triennial cycle, and a careful investigation of these may lead to the discovery of an arrangement of sedarim different from that heretofore known from old registers. However, there are sections, especially in the beginning of the midrash, in which only one or a few verses at a time are expounded. The Torah portions of the customary one-year cycle are not regarded at all in the divisions of Genesis Rabba, neither are they marked in the best manuscripts or in the editio princeps of the midrash; the sections, therefore, can not be regarded as mere subdivisions of the sedarim, as which they appear in later editions of this midrash.

== Significance ==
Genesis Rabbah is the first recorded rabbinic commentary on Sefer Breishit, the Book of Genesis. It is also the first collection of majority aggadic (non-legal) midrash, as compared to previous midrashic compilations that were primarily concerned with halakhah (law). It is a foundational text for subsequent Jewish interpretations of the Book of Genesis.

Genesis Rabbah created a unique account of the Book of Genesis, and many of those stories, embellishments, and additions have become part of Jewish cultural transmission. Children and distinguished scholars alike are often exposed to and study its stories, which have become a part of Jewish culture itself.

Scholars study Genesis Rabbah to gain insights into Rabbinic culture, the literary features of Rabbinic work (particularly of aggadah), the history of Jewish-Roman interaction, the history of Jewish-Greek philosophic interactions, and more.

Genesis Rabbah was a significant text in the history of Jewish cosmological literature, paving the way for other texts to address this topic in more detail, such as the Seder Rabbah di-Bereshit.

== Print editions ==
- Midrash Rabbah: Genesis. Translated by H. Freedman and Maurice Simon, Vols. 1–2. London: Soncino Press, 1983. ISBN 0-900689-38-2.
- Jacob Neusner. Confronting Creation: How Judaism Reads Genesis: An Anthology of Genesis Rabbah. Columbia, S.C.: University of South Carolina Press, 1991. ISBN 0-87249-732-1.
- Artscroll Kleinman Edition Midrash Rabbah Genesis Vol 1–4, English/Hebrew with English elucidation http://www.artscroll.com/Books/mrbr2.html
