= Pesikta Rabbati =

Jewish medieval homilies

Pesikta Rabbati (Aramaic: פסיקתא רבתי P'siqta Rabbati, "The Larger P'siqta") is a collection of aggadic midrash (homilies) on the Pentateuchal and prophetic readings, the special Sabbaths, and so on. It was composed around 845 CE and probably called "rabbati" (the larger) to distinguish it from the earlier Pesikta de-Rav Kahana (PdRK).

== Contents ==
Pesikta Rabbati has five entire piskot (sections) in common with PdRK—numbers 15 ("Ha-Hodesh"), 16 ("Korbani Lachmi"), 17 ("Vayechi ba-Hatzi"), 18 ("Omer"), 33 ("Aniyyah So'arah"), and the majority of 14 ("Para")—but is otherwise very different from PdRK; it is similar to the Tanhuma midrashim.

In 1880, Meir Friedmann edited a version of the Pesikta Rabbati which contains, in 47 numbers, about 51 homilies, part of which are combinations of smaller ones; seven or eight of these homilies belong to Hanukkah, and about seven each to Shavuot and Rosh Hashana, while the older PdRK contains one each for Hanukkah and Shavuot and two for Rosh Hashana.

Pesikta Rabbati contains also homilies to Torah readings which are not paralleled in PdRK. There are also various differences between these two Pesiktot in regard to the Torah readings for holidays and for the Sabbaths of mourning and of comforting. The works are entirely different in content, with the exception of the above-mentioned Nos. 15-18, the part of No. 14, and some few minor parallels. PdRK contains no halakhic exordiums or proems by R. Tanhuma. But in the Pesikta Rabbati there are 28 homilies with such exordiums having the formula "Yelammedenu Rabbenu," followed by proems with the statement "kach patach R. Tanhuma"; while two homilies (Nos. 38 and 45, the first of which is probably defective) have the Yelammedenu but lack proems with "kach patach".

Some of the homilies have more than one proem by R. Tanhuma. The piskot taken from PdRK have of course no Yelammedenu or Tanḥuma proems; the first part of piskah No. 14, which does not belong to PdRK, has at the beginning two halakhic introductions and one proem of R. Tanhuma. Homilies Nos. 20-24, which together form a midrash to the Ten Commandments, lack these introductions and proems. Only three of the homilies for the Sabbaths of mourning and comforting (Nos. 29, 31, 33) have such passages; but they are prefixed to those homilies, beginning with No. 38 (except No. 46, which is of foreign origin), which have the superscription "Midrash Harninu"—a name used to designate the homilies for Rosh Hashana and Sukkot which the old authors found in the Pesikta Rabbati.

The present edition of the Pesikta Rabbati, which ends with the homily for Yom Kippur, is doubtless defective; the older PdRK has also various homilies for Sukkot, Shemini Atzeret, and Simchat Torah. In addition, some of the homilies (Nos. 19, 27, 38, 39, 45) are defective. Pesikta Rabbati therefore appears to be a combination of various parts; perhaps the homilies were added later.

It is said above that No. 46 is a foreign addition; here Psalms 90:1 is interpreted as an acrostic למשה (ascribed to Moses), and there is also a passage from the Midrash Konen. Other passages also may have been added, as the passage in No. 20, which is elsewhere quoted in the name of the "Pirkei Heikhalot" and of "Ma'aseh Bereshit". No. 36 was considered doubtful on account of its contents; No. 26 is peculiar, referring not to a Scripture passage but to a verse or a parable composed by the author.

The diction and style are very fine in many passages. In the beginning of the first homily, which shows the characteristics of the "genuine" portions of the Pesikta Rabbati (in the proems of R. Tanhuma following the halakic exordium), the year 845 is indicated as the date of composition of the work; there are no grounds for regarding the date as a gloss.

In the appendix to the Friedmann edition, four homilies are printed from a manuscript, Nos. 1 and 2 of which have yelammedenus and proems. The midrash referred to here is a later, shorter midrash for the feast-days, designated as "New Pesikta," and frequently drawing upon the Pesikta Rabbati; it has been published by Jellinek.

== Sources ==
- Pesikta Rabbati; Discourses for Feasts, Fasts, and Special Sabbaths, Part 1 (1968), translated by William G. Braude. Yale University Press. ISBN 9780300010718. William G. Braude is Rabbi of the Congregation Sons of Israel and David, Providence, Rhode Island.
- Rivka Ulmer (ed.), A Synoptic Edition Of Pesiqta Rabbati Based Upon All Extant Hebrew Manuscripts And The Editio Princeps. Vol. I. Atlanta: Scholars Press, 1997. Vol. II. Atlanta: Scholars Press, 1999.Vol. III and Index. Lanham, MD: University Press of America, 2002. Paperback edition, vols. I-III, 2009.
- Jewish Virtual Library - Pesikta Rabbati
