= Mekhilta of Rabbi Shimon ben Yochai =

The Mekhilta of Rabbi Shimon ben Yochai (Jewish Babylonian Aramaic: מכילתא דרבי שמעון בן יוחאי, romanized: Mǝkhilta dǝ-Rabbi Shimʿon ben Yoḥai) is midrash halakha on the Book of Exodus from the school of Rabbi Akiva attributed to Shimon bar Yochai.

No midrash of this name is mentioned in Talmudic literature, but Nachmanides (d.1270) refers to one which he calls either Mekhilta de-Rabbi Shimon ben Yochai, Mekhilta Achǝrita de-Rabbi Shimon, or simply Mekhilta Acheret. Todros ben Joseph Abulafia (d.1285) also refers to Mekhilta de-Rabbi Shimon ben Yochai.

== Date ==
The current scholarly consensus is that the Mekhilta dates to the period of the Amoraim (200–500 AD).

== References by later writers ==
Passages from this Mekhilta are cited in later works, especially by Nahmanides in his Pentateuchal commentary, and by Todros Abulafia in his works Sefer ha-Razim and Otzar ha-Kabod. Maimonides, in his Sefer Hamitzvot (assertive command no. 157), also cites from the Mekhilta of Rabbi Shimon ben Yochai.

Until the early 1900s, aside from these quotations and some given by certain authors of the 16th century (such as Elijah Mizrahi in his Sefer ha-Mizrachi, Shem-Ṭob ben Abraham in his Migdal Oz, and R. Meir ibn Gabbai in his Tola'at Ya'akov), the only known extract of any length from Mekhilta de-Rabbi Shimon was the one published by R. Isaac Elijah Landau from a manuscript of R. Abraham Halami, as an appendix to his edition of the Mekhilta.

There were, therefore, various erroneous opinions regarding this lost work. Zunz considered it as a kabbalistic work ascribed to R. Shimon ben Yochai. M. H. Landauer identified it with the Mekhilta of Rabbi Ishmael, while J. Perles held that the medieval authors applied the name "Mekhilta de-Rabbi Shimon" merely to his maxims which were included in the Mekhilta de-Rabbi Yishmael, since separate sentences could be called "mekhilta". M. Friedmann was the first to maintain that, in addition to R. Ishmael's work, there was a halakhic midrash to Exodus by R. Shimon, which was called the "Mekhilta de-Rabbi Shimon," and that this Mekhilta formed part of the Sifre mentioned in the Talmud Bavli.

This assumption of Friedmann's was subsequently confirmed by the publication of a geonic responsum, where a baraita from the Sifre de-Bei Rav to Exodus is quoted, which is the same passage as that cited by Nahmanides from the Mekhilta de-Rabbi Shimon ben Yochai, in his commentary on Exodus 22:12. This extract designates the work of R. Ishmael as the "Mekhilta of Palestine," in contradistinction to Shimon ben Yochai's midrash. It is clear, therefore, that the Mekhilta of R. Shimon was implied in the title Sifre de-Bei Rav; and it is mentioned in the Midrash Tehillim under the Hebrew name Middat Rabbi Shimon ben Yochai.

It is possible also that Shimon himself intended to refer to his midrash in his saying: "My sons, learn my middot; for my middot are the finest of the finest middot of Rabbi Akiva". The Judean sources, the Yerushalmi and the aggadic midrashim, introduce baraitot from this Mekhilta with the phrase, "Tanei Rabbi Shimon" = "Rabbi Shimon has taught". The phrase "Tana de-Bei Rabbi Shimon" is extremely rare, however, in the Talmud Bavli, where this midrash ranks as one of the "Sifre de-Bei Rav". Many sentences of Shimon are quoted there in the name of his son Eleazar, so that Hoffmann has very plausibly concluded that Eleazar edited his father's midrash.

== Current status ==
The Mekhilta de-Rabbi Shimon had disappeared, but some extracts from it were preserved in the collection known as Midrash haGadol, as Israel Lewy first pointed out. These fragments were collected by David Zvi Hoffmann and published under the title Mechilta de R. Simon b. Jochai.

This Mekhilta compiled from Midrash haGadol preserves abundant material from the earliest Scriptural commentaries, quoting, for instance, a sentence from the Doreshei Reshumot on Exodus 21:12 which is found nowhere else. It contains also much from post-Talmudic literature, for the collector and redactor of the Midrash haGadol had a peculiar way of dressing sentences of such medieval authorities as Rashi, Ibn Ezra, Arukh, and Maimonides in midrashic garb and presenting them as ancient maxims.

A critical version, using newly discovered fragments of texts, was later published by Yaakov Nahum Epstein and his student Ezra Zion Melamed. The publication is an attempt to reconstruct the original Mekhilta of Rabbi Shimon ben Yochai, based on all extant sources.

== English editions ==
- Nelson, David (2006), Mekhilta de-Rabbi Shimon bar Yoḥai, Philadelphia: Jewish Publication Society.

== Jewish Encyclopedia bibliography ==
- M. Friedmann, introduction to his edition of the Mekhilta, pp. 51–73, Vienna, 1870;
- David Zvi Hoffmann, Einleitung in die Halachischen Midraschim, pp. 45–51, Berlin, 1887;
- Israel Lewy, Ein Wort über die Mechilta des R. Simon, Breslau, 1889.
