= Mekhilta le-Sefer Devarim =

The Mekhilta le-Sefer Devarim (Hebrew: מכילתא לספר דברים, lit. 'collection of rules of interpretation for the Book of Deuteronomy') is a halakhic midrash to Deuteronomy from the school of Rabbi Ishmael which is no longer extant. No midrash by this name is mentioned in Talmudic literature, nor do the medieval authors refer to such a work. Although Maimonides says, "R. Ishmael explained from 've-eleh shemot' to the conclusion of the Torah, that is, the Mekhilta," he did not see this midrash, which also includes Deuteronomy, since he does not quote any Mekhilta passages to that book of the Pentateuch in his Sefer ha-Mitzvot, although he draws upon the halakhic midrashim in discussing most of the commandments. Maimonides probably knew, therefore, merely through an old tradition which he had heard that such a midrash by R. Ishmael existed.

== Evidence in favor of its existence ==
But there are other circumstances which prove that there was once such a work. Many midrashic baraitot to Deuteronomy are introduced in the Talmud with the words "Tena debei R. Yishmael," and may be recognized in form and substance as R' Ishmael's midrashim. Bava Batra 124b quotes a passage to a verse in Deuteronomy from the "She'ar Sifre devei Rav," a term by which the Mekhilta de-Rabbi Yishmael is designated. This clearly indicates that there was a midrash to Deuteronomy by R. Ishmael at the period of the Amoraim.

This work, which was called also "Mekhilta," disappeared at an early date, and was therefore unknown to the medieval authors. The editor of the Midrash ha-Gadol, however, knew it and included many passages from it in his collection. The citations from R. Ishmael's Mekhilta to Deuteronomy which are contained in the Midrash ha-Gadol have been collected by David Zvi Hoffmann and printed under the title Liḳḳuṭe Mekilta: Collectaneen aus einer Mechilta and separately under the title Liḳḳuṭe Batar Liḳḳuṭe: Neue Collectaneen aus einer Mechilta zu Deuteronomium. It appears from these passages that this midrash contained much valuable material from the earlier halakic exegetes. Especially noteworthy is the statement that R. Simon Gamaliel, together with R. Johanan b. Zakkai, addressed a circular letter to the Galileans and other communities, a statement which certainly antedates the parallel passage in Tosefta, Sanh. 2:6.

Hoffmann's collection of extracts from the Mekhilta includes also many quotations from Maimonides' Yad. Aside from the passages included in the Midrash ha-Gadol, some fragments of the Mekhilta have been preserved in the Cairo Genizah; these were discovered by S. Schechter and published by him in the J. Q. R.

== Jewish Encyclopedia bibliography ==
- D. Hoffmann, Zur Einleitung in die Halachischen Midraschim, p. 77, Berlin, 1887;
- idem, Ueber eine Mechilta zu Deuteronomium, in Jubelschrift zum Siebzigsten Geburtstag des Dr. Isr. Hildesheimer, German part, pp. 83–98, Berlin, 1890.
