= Sifri Zutta =

Sifre Zutta (Hebrew: ספרי זוטא) was a Mishnaic Hebrew-language midrash on the Book of Numbers. Medieval authors mention it under the titles Sifre shel Panim Acherim and Vi-Yeshallehu Zutta; and to distinguish from it the Sifre, Isaac ben Moses of Vienna calls the latter Sifre Rabbati.

The Sifre Zutta has not been preserved and was no longer extant by the time of Abraham Lévy-Bacrat (around 1500). (Note: It was no longer extant at the time Bakrat wrote his commentary on Rashi; compare Brüll, Der Kleine Sifre, in Grätz Jubelschrift, p. 184) However, fragments of the work have been discovered in the Cairo Geniza, and excerpts from it are quoted in the Midrash HaGadol and in Yalkut Shimoni. Compilations have been published.

== Quotations in other early works ==
Earlier authors knew of it and occasionally quoted it, such as Samson ben Abraham of Sens in his commentary on the mishnaic orders Zera'im and Ṭohorot. Numerous fragments are found in the section of Yalkut Shimoni on the Book of Numbers. Quotations are found also in Numbers Rabbah to Naso. The "Mekhilta to Numbers" frequently quoted by Maimonides in his Sefer ha-Mitzvot is identical to the Sifre Zutta; for all his quotations may be identified among the fragments of the Sifre contained in the Yalḳuṭ Shimoni, except a single passage in Shoresh 11 referring to a Biblical section, on which Yalkut Shimoni has not quoted the Sifre. Maimonides frequently drew upon the Sifre Zutta in his Yad ha-Hazakah also. Other medieval authors who occasionally quoted it are mentioned by Brüll.

The Midrash HaGadol on Numbers quotes most of the Sifre Zutta and has recently become a source of information concerning the latter. Around 1900, Königsberger began to edit the Sifre Zutta based on the Midrash ha-Gadol and Yalkut Shimoni extracts. A small fragment of the Sifre has been published by Solomon Schechter.

== From the School of R. Akiva ==
The Sifre Zutta belongs to Rabbi Akiva's school, as is indicated by the method of exposition, e.g., that of the double expressions in Numbers 35:21; of the partitive מן in Numbers 15:19, and the ו in Numbers 5:2; the phrases זאת תורה and לאמר as in the Sifra. There are also other points of similarity with the Sifra; e.g., the terminology in part, as אחר שרבה להגיד מה גרם, והלא דין הוא, הכתוב מעט; although there are some unusual expressions, as ובצד השני for דבר אחר and מכל צד for מכל מקום and אמרת for ת"ל.

Furthermore, some of the views expressed in the Sifre Zutta correspond with views known to be Rabbi Akiva's, as in 5:14, and 5:15. The midrash may be assigned to Simeon bar Yochai rather than to Judah bar Ilai (as is done in the case of the Sifra), although perhaps some of the anonymous halakhot, such as 5:15 and 15:4 express Judah's views. R. Simeon's authorship is indicated by the fact that he is mentioned least often in the midrash, and that of the later tanna R. Eleazar b. Simeon is mentioned a few times.

Additional indications point to Simeon's authorship, as, for example, the enumeration of the positive and negative commandments, which is said to be a characteristic of the Sifre to Deuteronomy, this midrash also being ascribed to Simeon. Further evidence is presented by the correspondence of various halakot with Simeon's views. Aside from the passages quoted by D. Hoffmann, some of which represent Simeon's views more exactly than others—the parallel between 5:7 and Mekhilta Mishpatim 15 is doubtful, on account of the different readings in the Mekilta—still others must be taken into account; e.g., Sifre Zutta 5:21 compared with Tosefta, Shevuot 3:7; 6:20, with Nazir 46a; and, what is especially characteristic, the reason for the law under consideration (טעמא דקרא) is inquired into, as in 5:15 and 19:16.

The well-known reference of the Talmud, סתם ספרי ר"ש, may therefore apply to Sifre Zutta, in which, furthermore, there are several interpretive notes on passages of Book of Numbers mentioned in the Talmud, but which are not found in the larger Sifre. The fact that the Sifre Zutta to 5:27 contradicts Simeon's view shows merely that the editor also drew upon other midrashim, including, perhaps, that of Eliezer ben Jacob I and that of Rabbi Ishmael. Noteworthy are the terms אין במשמע אלא and אמרת for ת"ל, which are known to have been used by Eliezer ben Jacob. The fact that Judah haNasi is not mentioned leads Hoffmann to the conclusion that a student of Judah did not edit the Sifre Zutta. Some Tannaim whose names are not found elsewhere are mentioned therein, such as Simeon ben Nehunyon and Papyas of Ono.

By 1900, the Sifre Zutta had not yet been thoroughly studied.
