= Vayakhel =

Tenth part of week in book Shemot

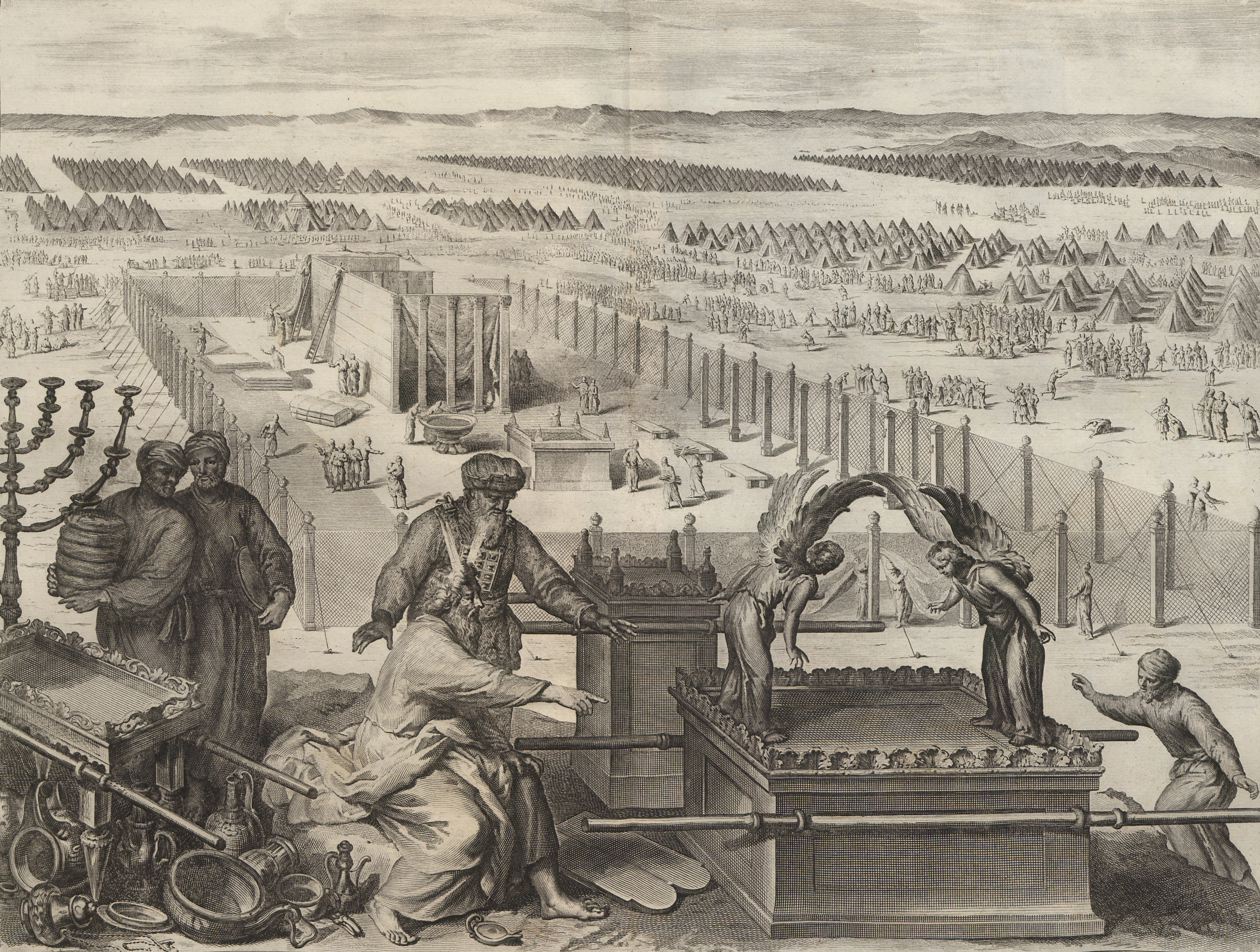
The Erection of the Tabernacle and the Sacred Vessels (illustration from the 1728 Figures de la Bible)

Vayakhel, Wayyaqhel, VaYakhel, Va-Yakhel, Vayak'hel, Vayak'heil, or Vayaqhel (וַיַּקְהֵל—Hebrew for "and he assembled," the first word in the parashah) is the 22nd weekly Torah portion (פָּרָשָׁה, parashah) in the weekly Torah portion and the 10th of the Book of Exodus. The parashah tells of the making of the Tabernacle and its sacred vessels. It constitutes Exodus 35:1–38:20. The parashah is made up of 6181 Hebrew letters, 1,558 Hebrew words, 122 verses, and 211 lines in a Torah scroll (סֵפֶר תּוֹרָה, Sefer Torah).

Rabbinic Jews read it on the 22nd Shabbat after Simchat Torah, generally in March or rarely in late February. The lunisolar Hebrew calendar contains up to 55 weeks, the exact number varying between 50 in common years and 54 or 55 in leap years. In leap years (for example, 2024 and 2027), Parashat Vayakhel is read separately. In common years (for example, 2023 and 2026), Parashat Vayakhel is usually combined with the next parashah, Pekudei, to help achieve the number of weekly readings needed (although in some non-leap years, such as 2025, they are not combined).

== Readings ==
In traditional Sabbath Torah reading, the parashah is divided into seven readings, or עליות, aliyot.

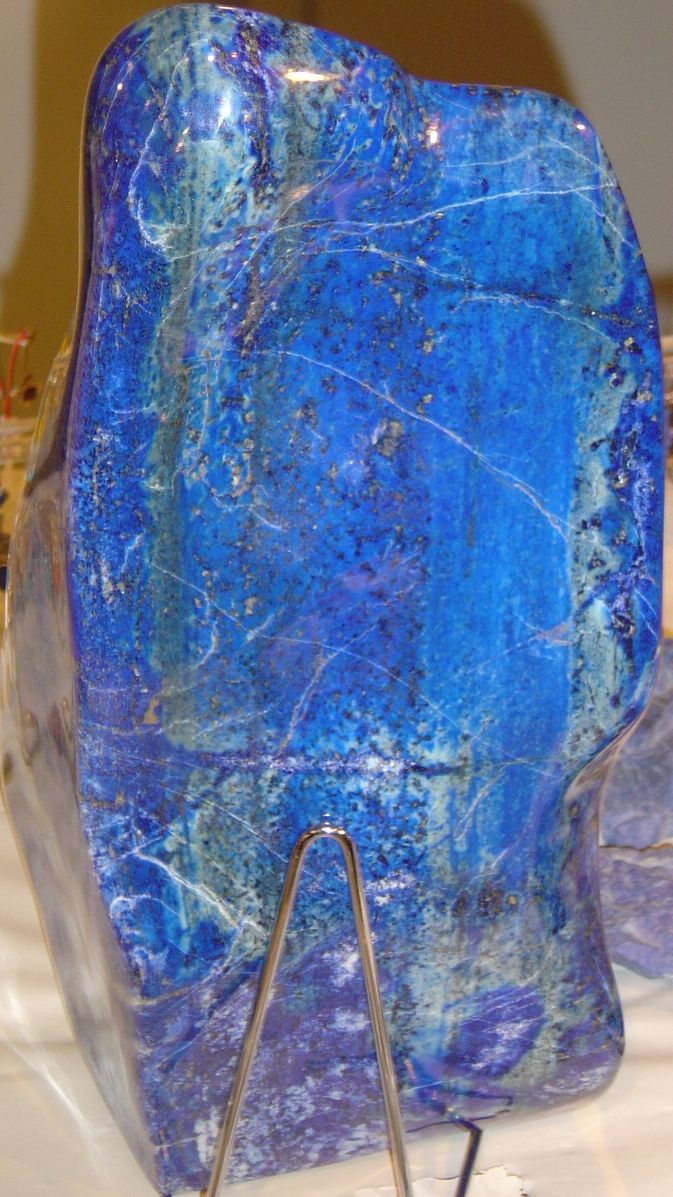
Lapis lazuli

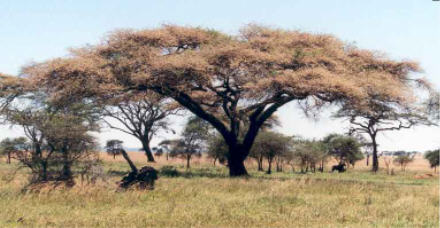
Acacia tree

=== First reading—Exodus 35:1–20 ===
In the first reading (עליה, aliyah), Moses convoked the Israelites to build the Tabernacle. Moses started by reminding them of God's commandment to keep the Sabbath of complete rest. Then Moses told them to collect gifts of materials from those whose heart so moved them—gifts of gold, silver, copper, colored yarns, fine linen, goats hair, tanned ram skins, acacia wood, olive oil, spices, lapis lazuli, and other stones. Moses invited all who were skilled to make the Tabernacle, its furnishings, and the priests' vestments.

=== Second reading—Exodus 35:21–29 ===
In the second reading (עליה, aliyah), the Israelites brought the gifts that Moses requested.

=== Third reading—Exodus 35:30–36:7 ===
In the third reading (עליה, aliyah), Moses announced that God had singled out Bezalel and Oholiab to endow them with the skills needed to construct the Tabernacle. And Moses called on them and all skilled persons to undertake the task. The Israelites brought more than was needed, so Moses proclaimed an end to the collection.

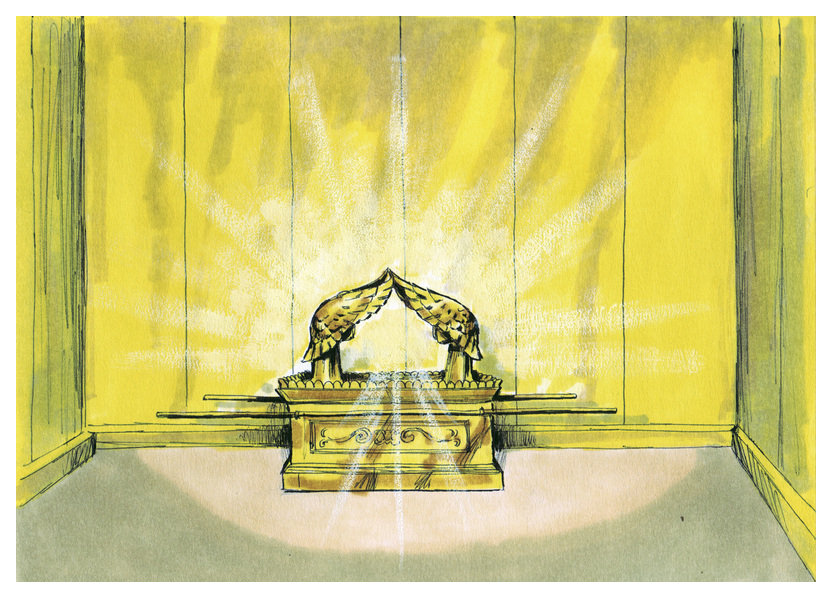
The Ark in the Tabernacle (1984 illustration by Jim Padgett, courtesy of Distant Shores Media/Sweet Publishing)

=== Fourth reading—Exodus 36:8–19 ===
In the fourth reading (עליה, aliyah), the skilled workers fashioned the Tabernacle's curtains, loop, clasps, and coverings.

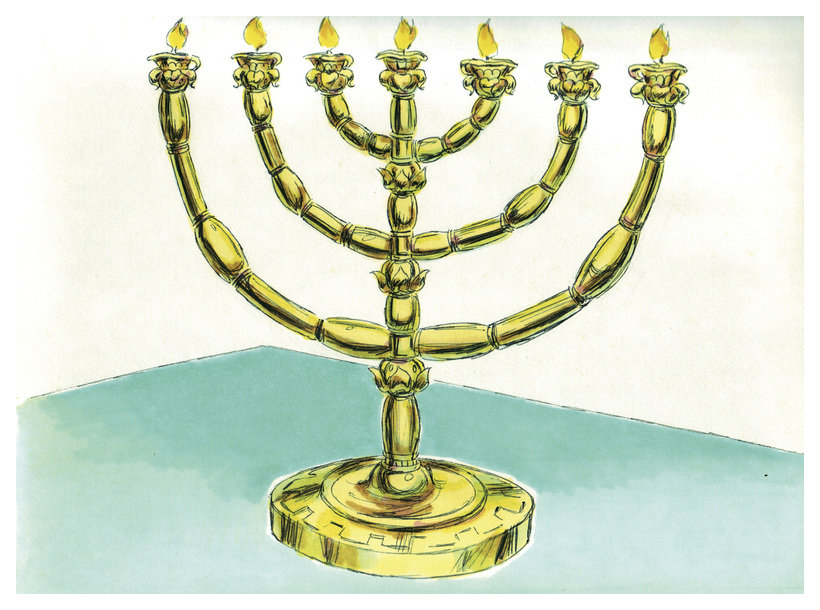
The Menorah (1984 illustration by Jim Padgett, courtesy of Distant Shores Media/Sweet Publishing)

=== Fifth reading—Exodus 36:20–37:16 ===
In the long fifth reading (עליה, aliyah), they made the Tabernacle's standing, gold clad, polished boards each with 2 tenons, and their 2 silver sockets, bars of acacia-wood overlaid with gold, rings of gold, veil of the covering, 4 pillars of acacia-wood overlaid with gold, screen for the door held by 5 gold clad pillars, and sockets of brass. Bezalel made the ark, cover, and 7 golden oil lamps pushed over against the golden lampstand which partially covers the table.

=== Sixth reading—Exodus 37:17–29 ===
In the sixth reading (עליה, aliyah), Bezalel made the temple menorah and incense altar.

=== Seventh reading—Exodus 38:1–20 ===
In the seventh reading (עליה, aliyah), Bezalel made the altar for sacrifices, laver, and enclosure for the Tabernacle.

=== Readings according to the triennial cycle ===
Jews who read the Torah according to the triennial cycle of Torah reading may read the parashah according to a different schedule.

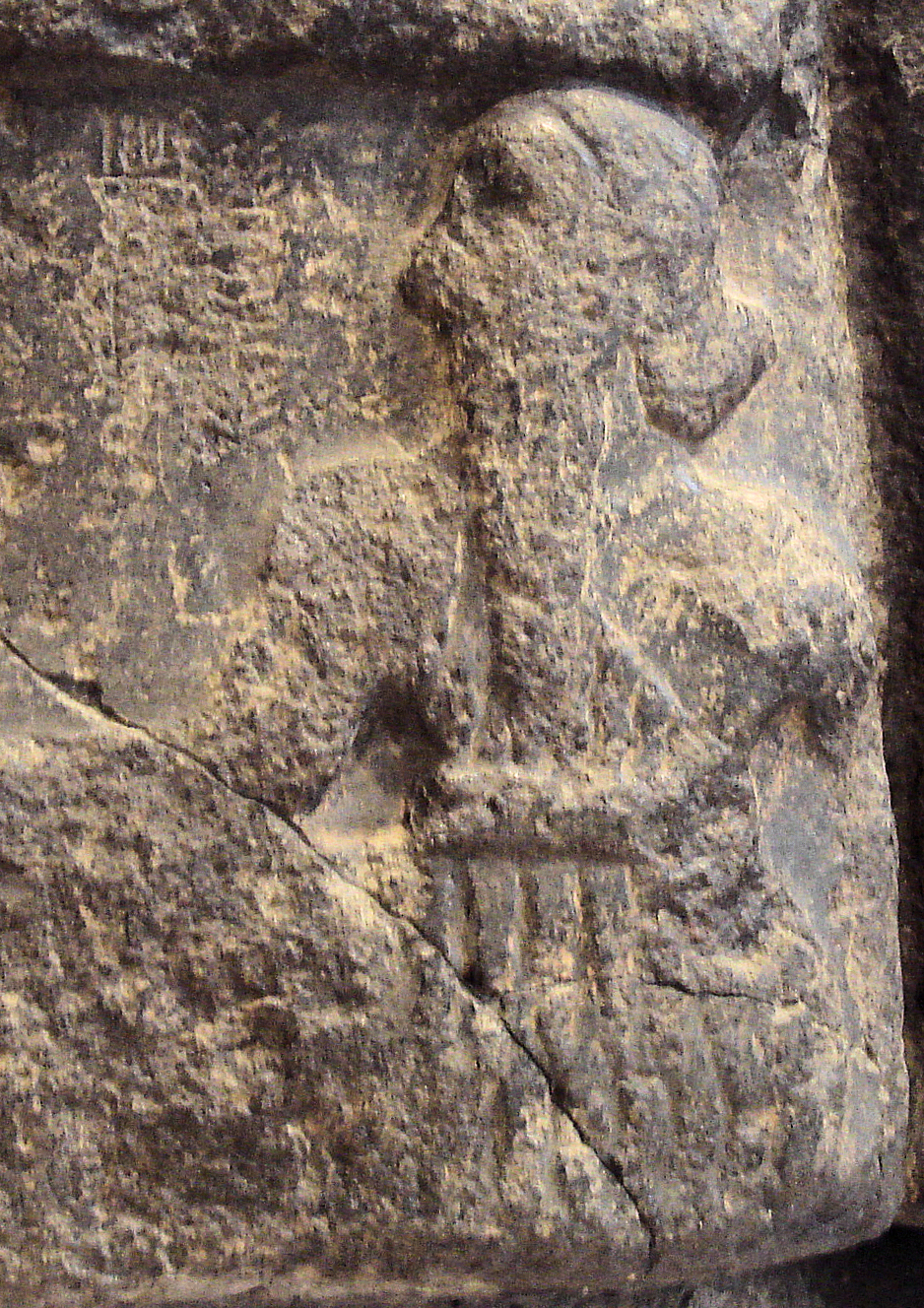
Sargon

== In ancient parallels ==
The parashah has parallels in these ancient sources:

=== Exodus chapter 35 ===
Noting that Sargon of Akkad was the first to use a seven-day week, Professor Gregory S. Aldrete of the University of Wisconsin–Green Bay speculated that the Israelites may have adopted the idea from the Akkadian Empire.

== Inner-biblical interpretation ==
The parashah has parallels or is discussed in these Biblical sources:

=== Exodus chapters 25–39 ===
This is the pattern of instruction and construction of the Tabernacle and its furnishings:

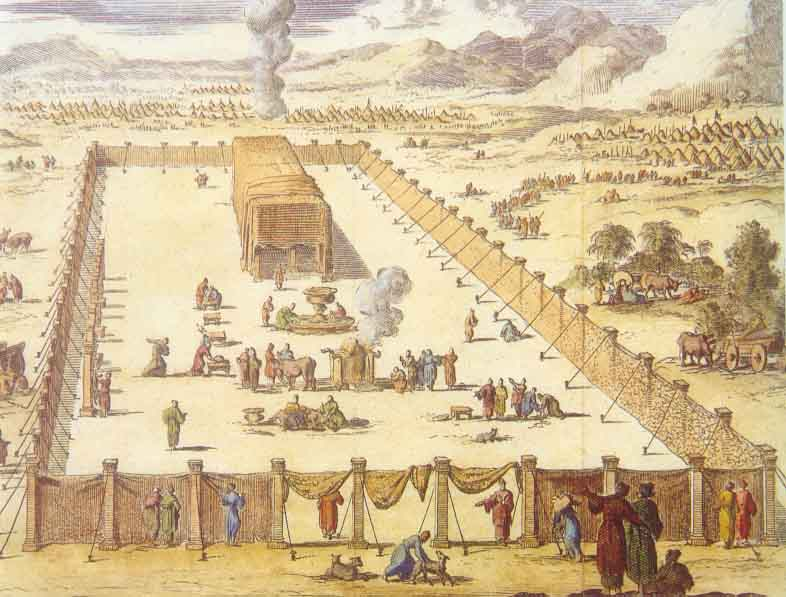
The Tabernacle

Item	Instruction		Construction	
Item	Order	Verses	Order	Verses
The Sabbath	16	Exodus 31:12–17	1	Exodus 35:1–3
Contributions	1	Exodus 25:1–9	2	Exodus 35:4–29
Craftspeople	15	Exodus 31:1–11	3	Exodus 35:30–36:7
Tabernacle	5	Exodus 26:1–37	4	Exodus 36:8–38
Ark	2	Exodus 25:10–22	5	Exodus 37:1–9
Table	3	Exodus 25:23–30	6	Exodus 37:10–16
Menorah	4	Exodus 25:31–40	7	Exodus 37:17–24
Altar of Insense	11	Exodus 30:1–10	8	Exodus 37:25–28
Anointing Oil	13	Exodus 30:22–33	9	Exodus 37:29
Incense	14	Exodus 30:34–38	10	Exodus 37:29
Altar of Sacrifice	6	Exodus 27:1–8	11	Exodus 38:1–7
Laver	12	Exodus 30:17–21	12	Exodus 38:8
Tabernacle Court	7	Exodus 27:9–19	13	Exodus 38:9–20
Priestly Garments	9	Exodus 28:1–43	14	Exodus 39:1–31
Ordination Ritual	10	Exodus 29:1–46	15	Leviticus 8:1–9:24
Lamp	8	Exodus 27:20–21	16	Numbers 8:1–4

=== Exodus chapter 35 ===
Exodus 35:1 opens, "And Moses assembled" (וַיַּקְהֵל מֹשֶׁה, wayyaqhēl Moše), in an echo of Exodus 32:1, which says, "the people assembled" (וַיִּקָּהֵל הָעָם, vayyiqāhēl hāʿām).

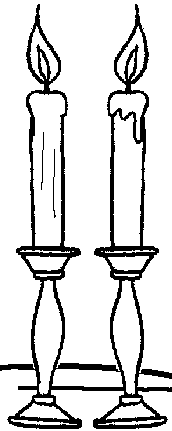
Shabbat candles

==== The Sabbath ====
Exodus 35:1–3 refers to the Sabbath. Exodus 35:3 prohibits kindling fire on Shabbat. Numbers 15:32–33 reports that when the Israelites came upon a man gathering wood on Shabbat, apparently with the intent to fuel a fire, they brought him before Moses, Aaron, and the community and placed him in custody, "because it had not been declared what should be done to him." Clearing up any uncertainty about whether the man had violated the law and what punishment should be given, God told Moses that the whole community was to pelt him with stones outside the camp, which they did.

Commentators note that the Hebrew Bible repeats the commandment to observe the Sabbath 12 times.

Genesis 2:1–3 reports that on the seventh day of Creation, God finished God's work, rested, blessed, and hallowed the seventh day.

Observance of the Sabbath is one of the Ten Commandments. Exodus 20:8–11 commands that one remember the Sabbath day, keep it holy, and not do any manner of work or cause anyone under one's control to work, for in six days God made heaven and earth and rested on the seventh day, blessed the Sabbath, and hallowed it. Deuteronomy 5:12–15 commands that one observe the Sabbath day, keep it holy, and not do any manner of work or cause anyone under one's control to work — so that one's subordinates might also rest — and remember that the Israelites were servants in the land of Egypt, and God brought them out with a mighty hand and by an outstretched arm.

In the incident of the manna (מָן, man) in Exodus 16:22–30, Moses told the Israelites that the Sabbath is a solemn rest day; prior to the Sabbath one should cook what one would cook, and lay up food for the Sabbath. And God told Moses to let no one go out of one's place on the seventh day.

In Exodus 31:12–17, just before giving Moses the second Tablets of Stone, God commanded that the Israelites keep and observe the Sabbath throughout their generations, as a sign between God and the children of Israel forever, for in six days God made heaven and earth, and on the seventh day God rested.

In Exodus 35:1–3, just before issuing the instructions for the Tabernacle, Moses again told the Israelites that no one should work on the Sabbath, specifying that one must not kindle fire on the Sabbath.

In Leviticus 23:1–3, God told Moses to repeat the Sabbath commandment to the people, calling the Sabbath a holy convocation.

The prophet Isaiah taught in Isaiah 1:12–13 that iniquity is inconsistent with the Sabbath. In Isaiah 58:13–14, the prophet taught that if people turn away from pursuing or speaking of business on the Sabbath and call the Sabbath a delight, then God will make them ride upon the high places of the earth and will feed them with the heritage of Jacob. And in Isaiah 66:23, the prophet taught that in times to come, from one Sabbath to another, all people will come to worship God.

The prophet Jeremiah taught in Jeremiah 17:19–27 that the fate of Jerusalem depended on whether the people abstained from work on the Sabbath, refraining from carrying burdens outside their houses and through the city gates.

The prophet Ezekiel told in Ezekiel 20:10–22 how God gave the Israelites God's Sabbaths, to be a sign between God and them, but the Israelites rebelled against God by profaning the Sabbaths, provoking God to pour out God's fury upon them, but God stayed God's hand.

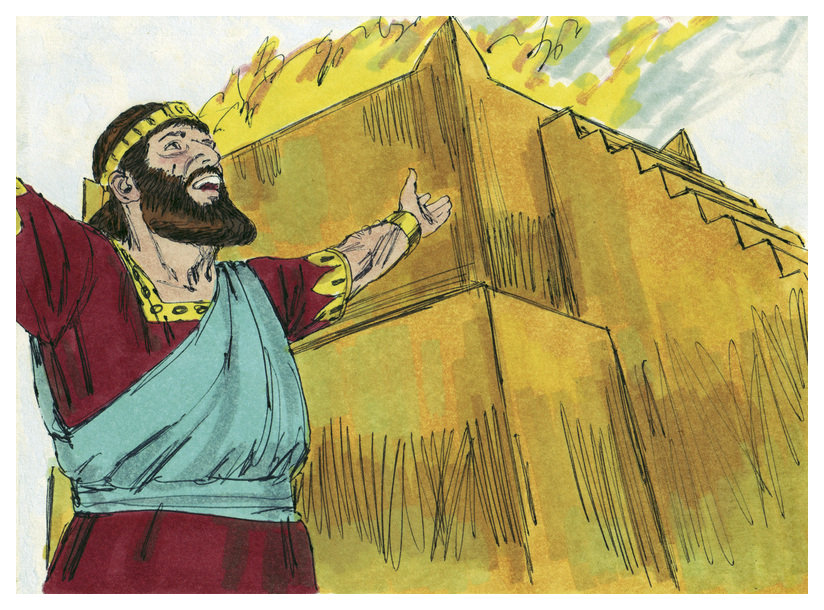
Solomon offered sacrifices on the altar that Bezalel built. (1984 illustration by Jim Padgett, courtesy of Distant Shores Media/Sweet Publishing)

In Nehemiah 13:15–22, Nehemiah told how he saw some treading winepresses on the Sabbath, and others bringing all manner of burdens into Jerusalem on the Sabbath day, so when it began to be dark before the Sabbath, he commanded that the city gates be shut and not opened till after the Sabbath and directed the Levites to keep the gates to sanctify the Sabbath.

=== Exodus chapter 38 ===
2 Chronicles 1:5–6 reports that the bronze altar, which Exodus 38:1–2 reports Bezalel made, still stood before the Tabernacle in Solomon's time, and Solomon sacrificed a thousand burnt offerings on it.

Exodus 38:8 reports that Bezalel made the bronze laver and its base from "the mirrors of the serving women who did service at the door of the tent of meeting." 1 Samuel 2:22 reports that the Shophet Eli's sons "lay with the women who did service at the door of the tent of meeting."

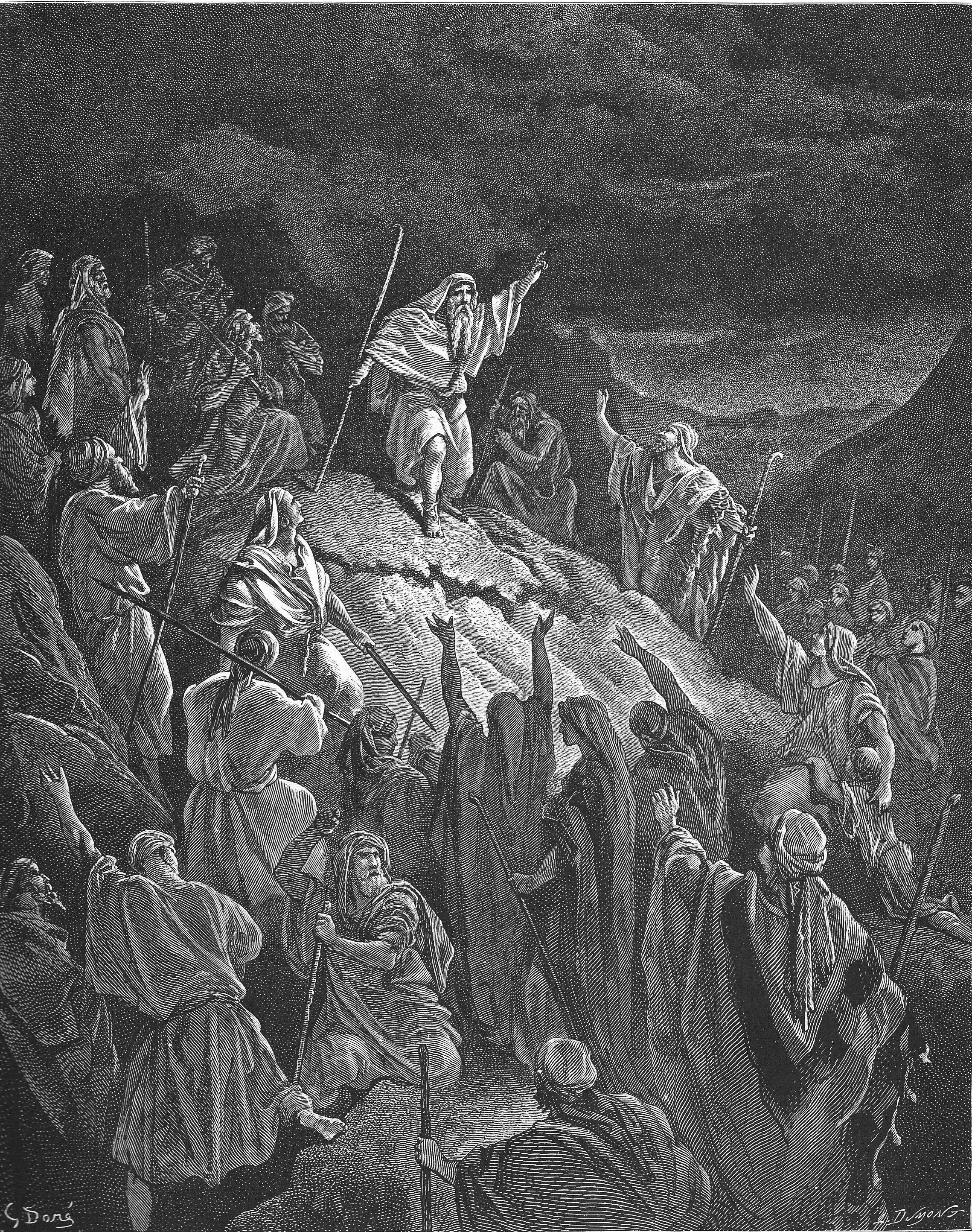
Mattathias appealing to Jewish refugees (illustration by Gustave Doré from the 1866 La Sainte Bible)

== In early nonrabbinic interpretation ==
The parashah has parallels or is discussed in these early nonrabbinic sources:

=== Exodus chapter 35 ===
1 Maccabees tells a story related to the Sabbath. Verses 2:27–38 told how in the 2nd century BCE, many followers of the pious Jewish priest Mattathias rebelled against the Seleucid emperor Antiochus IV Epiphanes. Antiochus; soldiers attacked a group of them on the Sabbath, and when the Pietists failed to defend themselves to honor the Sabbath (commanded in, among other places, Exodus 35:1–3), a thousand died. Veses 2:39–41 reported that when Mattathias and his friends heard, they reasoned that if they did not fight on the Sabbath, they would soon be destroyed. They decided that they would fight anyone who attacked them on the Sabbath.

Josephus wrote that when the Israelites brought together the materials with great diligence, Moses set architects over the works by the command of God. And these were the very same people that the people themselves would have chosen, had the election been allowed to them: Bezalel, the son of Uri, of the tribe of Judah, the grandson of Miriam, the sister of Moses; and Oholiab, file son of Ahisamach, of the tribe of Dan.

== Classical rabbinic interpretation ==
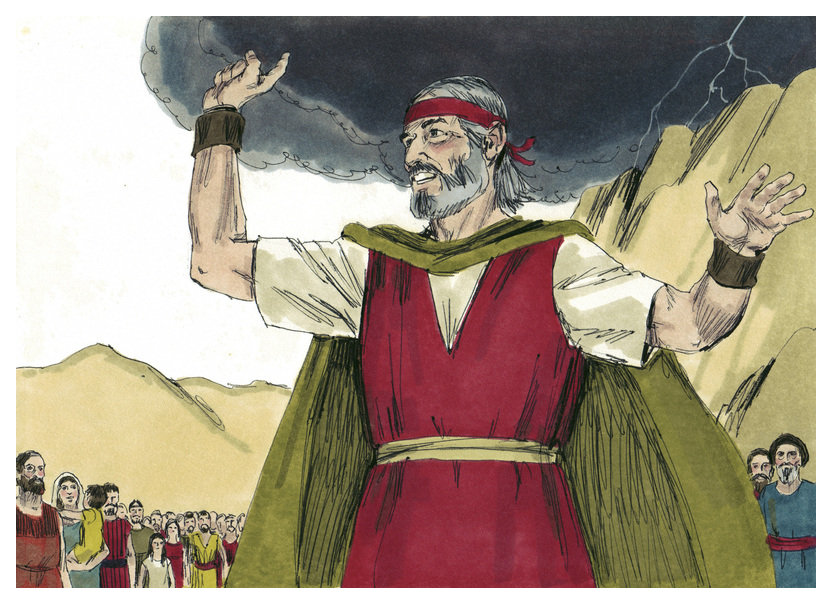
After 40 days and 40 nights on Mount Sinai, Moses addressed the people. (1984 illustration by Jim Padgett, courtesy of Distant Shores Media/Sweet Publishing)

The parashah is discussed in these rabbinic sources from the era of the Mishnah and the Talmud:

=== Exodus chapter 35 ===
The Seder Olam Rabbah taught that Moses descended from Mount Sinai on the 10th of Tishrei—Yom Kippur—and announced that God had shown the Israelites God's pleasure, as Exodus 34:9 says, "You will forgive our crimes and sins and let us inherit," and after that, all the Israelites presented themselves in the assembly that Moses called in Exodus 35:1, and Moses commanded them to build the Tabernacle.

The Mekhilta of Rabbi Ishmael taught that Exodus 35:1–3 sets forth laws of Sabbath observance here because in Exodus 25:8 God directed, "And let them make Me a sanctuary," and one might have understood that they could build the sanctuary both on weekdays and the Sabbath. The Mekhilta taught that God's direction in Exodus 25:8 to "make Me a sanctuary" applied on all days other than the Sabbath. The Mekhilta posited that one might argue that since the Temple service occurs even on the Sabbath, then perhaps the preparation for the service, without which the priests could not perform the service, could occur even on the Sabbath. One might conclude that if the horn of the altar broke off or a knife became defective, one might repair them on the Sabbath. Exodus 35:1–3 teaches, however, that even such work must be done only on weekdays, and not on the Sabbath.

Judah haNasi taught that the words "These are the words" in Exodus 35:1 referred to the 39 Melakhot that God taught Moses at Mount Sinai. Similarly, Hanina bar Hama said that the labors forbidden on the Sabbath in Exodus 35:2 correspond to the 39 labors necessary to construct the Tabernacle.

Tractate Shabbat in the Mishnah, Tosefta, Jerusalem Talmud, and Babylonian Talmud interpreted the laws of the Sabbath in Exodus 16:23 and 29; 20:8–11; 23:12; 31:13–17; 35:2–3; Leviticus 19:3; 23:3; Numbers 15:32–36; and Deuteronomy 5:12.

The Mishnah taught that every act that violates the law of the Sabbath also violates the law of a festival, except that one may prepare food on a festival but not on the Sabbath.

A Midrash asked to which commandment Deuteronomy 11:22 refers when it says, "FIf, then, you faithfully keep all this Instruction that I command you, loving your God יהוה, walking in all God’s ways, and holding fast to [God][...]". Rabbi Levi said that "this Instruction" refers to the recitation of the Shema (Deuteronomy 6:4–9), but the rabbis said that it refers to the Sabbath, which is equal to all the precepts of the Torah.

The Alphabet of Rabbi Akiva taught that when God was giving Israel the Torah, God told them that if they accepted the Torah and observed God's commandments, then God would give them for eternity a most precious thing that God possessed — the World To Come. When Israel asked to see in this world an example of the World To Come, God replied that the Sabbath is an example of the World To Come.

Reading the words "One who profanes it shall be put to death" in Exodus 31:14 (in which the verb for death is doubled), Samuel of Nehardea deduced that the Torah decreed many deaths for desecrating the Sabbath. The Gemara posited that perhaps Exodus 31:14 refers to willful desecration. The Gemara answered that Exodus 31:14 is not needed to teach that willful transgression of the Sabbath is a capital crime, for Exodus 35:2 says, "whoever does any work on it shall be put to death." The Gemara concluded that Exodus 31:14 thus must apply to an unwitting offender, and in that context, the words "shall be put to death" mean that the inadvertent Sabbath violator will "die" monetarily because of the violator's need to bring costly sacrifices.

A baraita read the words "You shall kindle no fire throughout your settlements on the sabbath day" in Exodus 35:3 to teach that only on the Sabbath is kindling fire prohibited, and one may kindle fire on a festival day, including for purposes other than food preparation.

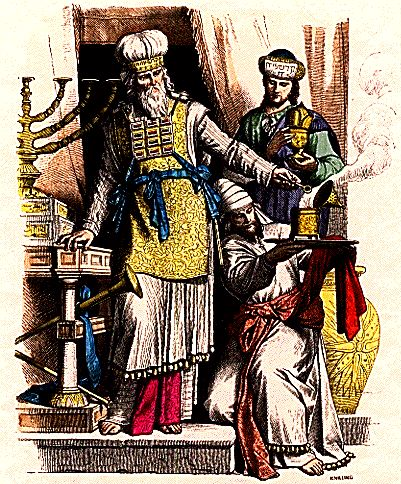
The High Priest wearing his breastplate (illustration circa 1861–1880 from The History of Costume by Braun and Schneider)

Rav Huna and Rav Ḥisda reconciled the prohibition of kindling fire on the Sabbath in Exodus 35:3 with the priests' sacrificial duties. The Mishnah taught that the priests could lower the Passover sacrifice into the oven just before nightfall (and leave it to roast on the Sabbath), and the priests could light the fire with chips in the pile in the Temple chamber of the hearth (just before nightfall). Interpreting this Mishnah, Rav Huna cited the prohibition of Exodus 35:3: "You shall kindle no fire throughout your habitations." Rav Huna argued that since Exodus 35:3 says only "throughout your habitations," the priests could kindle the pile in the Temple chamber of the hearth (even on the Sabbath). Rav Ḥisda demurred from Rav Huna's argument, as it would allow kindling even on the Sabbath. Rather, Rav Ḥisda taught that Exodus 35:3 permits only the burning of the limbs and the fat (of animals sacrificed on Friday before nightfall). Rav Ḥisda explained that this burning was allowed because the priests were very particular (in their observance of the Sabbath and would not stoke the fire after nightfall).

The Gemara told that Rav Joseph's wife used to kindle the Sabbath lights late (just before nightfall). Rav Joseph told her that it was taught in a Baraita that the words of Exodus 13:22, "the pillar of cloud by day, and the pillar of fire by night, departed not," teach that the pillar of cloud overlapped the pillar of fire, and the pillar of fire overlapped the pillar of cloud. So she thought of lighting the Sabbath lights very early. But an elder told her that one may kindle when one chooses, provided that one does not light too early (as it would not evidently honor the Sabbath) or too late (later than just before nightfall).

A Baraita taught that a disciple in the name of Rabbi Ishmael noted that the words "in all your dwellings" (בְּכֹל מֹשְׁבֹתֵיכֶם, b'chol moshvoteichem) appear both in the phrase, "You shall kindle no fire throughout your habitations upon the Sabbath day," in Exodus 35:3 and in the phrase, "these things shall be for a statute of judgment unto you throughout your generations in all your dwellings," in Numbers 35:29. The Baraita reasoned from this similar usage that just as the law prohibits kindling fire at home, so the law also prohibits kindling fire in the furtherance of criminal justice. And thus, since some executions require kindling a fire, the Baraita taught that the law prohibits executions on the Sabbath.

Rabbi Hama bar Hanina interpreted the words "the plaited (שְּׂרָד, serad) garments for ministering in the holy place" in Exodus 35:19 to teach that but for the priestly garments described in Exodus 28 (and the atonement achieved by the garments or the priests who wore them), no remnant (שָׂרִיד, sarid) of the Jews would have survived.

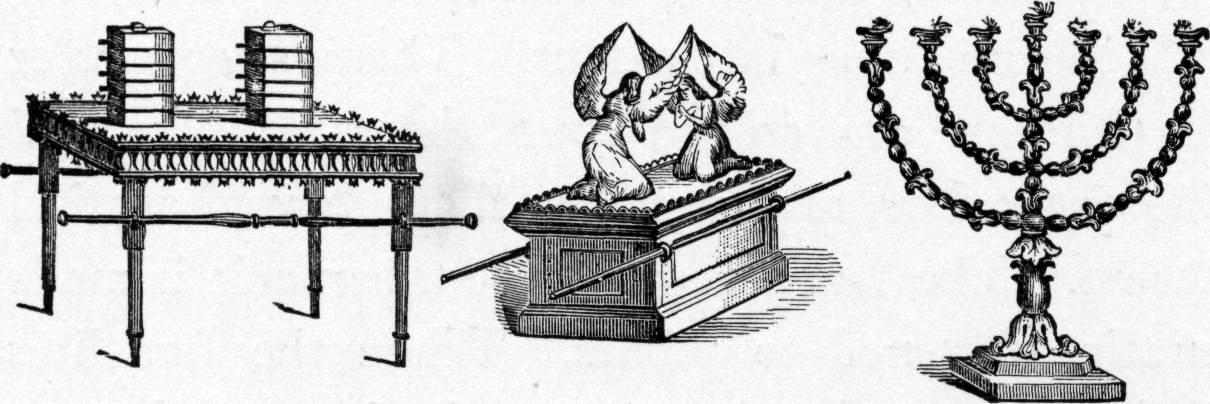
Things that Were Made To Go into the Tabernacle (illustration from the 1897 Bible Pictures and What They Teach Us by Charles Foster)

Rabbi Levi read Exodus 26:28, regarding "the middle bar in the midst of the boards, which shall pass through from end to end," calculated that the beam must have been 32 cubits in length, and asked where the Israelites would find such a beam in the desert. Rabbi Levi deduced that the Israelites had stored up the cedar to construct the Tabernacle since the days of Jacob. Thus Exodus 35:24 reports, "And every man, with whom was found acacia-wood," not "with whom would be found acacia-wood." Rabbi Levi taught that the Israelites cut the trees down in Magdala of the Dyers near Tiberias and brought them with them to Egypt, and no knot or crack was found in them.

The Rabbis taught in a Baraita that the Tabernacle's lower curtains were made of blue wool, purple wool, crimson wool, and fine linen, while the upper curtains that made the tent spread were made of goats' hair. And they taught that the upper curtains required greater skill than the lower, for Exodus 35:25 says of the lower ones, "And all the women that were wise-hearted did spin with their hands," while Exodus 35:26 says of the upper ones, "And all the women whose heart stirred them up in wisdom spun the goats." It was taught in Rabbi Nehemiah's name that the hair was washed on the goats and spun while still on the goats.

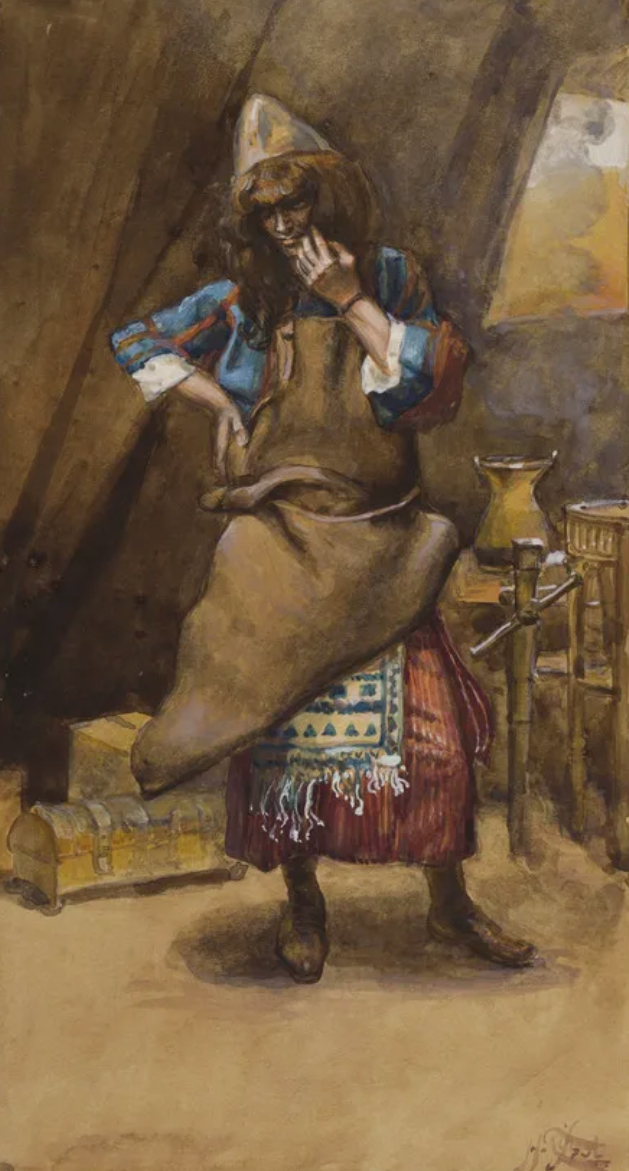
Bezalel (watercolor circa 1896–1902 by James Tissot)

Rabbi Isaac Nappaha deduced from Exodus 35:30 that we must not appoint a leader over a community without first consulting the community. In Exodus 35:30, Moses said to the Israelites: "See, the Lord has called by name Bezalel, the son of Uri." Rabbi Isaac read Exodus 35:30 to indicate that God asked Moses whether Moses considered Bezalel suitable. Moses replied that if God thought Bezalel suitable, then surely Moses would have to, as well. God told Moses nonetheless to go and consult the Israelites. Moses asked the Israelites whether they considered Bezalel suitable. And they replied that if God and Moses considered him suitable, surely they had to, as well.

Johanan bar Nappaha taught that God proclaims three things for God's Self: famine, plenty, and a good leader. 2 Kings 8:1 shows that God proclaims famine, when it says: "The Lord has called for a famine." Ezekiel 36:29 shows that God proclaims plenty, when it says: "I will call for the corn and will increase it." And Exodus 31:1–2 shows that God proclaims a good leader, when it says: "And the Lord spoke to Moses, saying, ‘See I have called by name Bezalel, the son of Uri.'" Samuel ben Nahman said in the name of Johanan that Bezalel (בְּצַלְאֵל, whose name can be read בְּצֵל אֶל, betzel El, "in the shadow of God") was so called because of his wisdom.

When God told Moses (in Exodus 31:7) to tell Bezalel to make a tabernacle, an ark, and vessels, Moses reversed the order and told Bezalel to make an ark, vessels, and a tabernacle. Bezalel replied to Moses that as a rule, one first builds a house and then brings vessels into it, but Moses directed to make an ark, vessels, and a tabernacle. Bezalel asked where he would put the vessels. And Bezalel asked whether God had told Moses to make a tabernacle, an ark, and vessels. Moses replied that perhaps Bezalel had been in the shadow of God (בְּצֵל אֶל, betzel El) and had thus come to know this.

The Tanḥuma bar Abba taught in the name of Rav Huna that even the things that Bezalel did not hear from Moses he conceived of on his own exactly as they were told to Moses from Sinai. Rabbi Tanḥuma said in the name of Rav Huna that one can deduce this from the words of Exodus 38:22, "And Bezalel the son of Uri, the son of Hur, of the tribe of Judah, made all that the Lord commanded Moses." For Exodus 38:22 does not say, "that Moses commanded him," but, "that the Lord commanded Moses."

And the Agadat Shir ha-Shirim taught that Bezalel and Oholiab went up Mount Sinai, where the heavenly Sanctuary was shown to them.

A midrash interpreted Exodus 35:30 in light of Ecclesiastes 7:1, "A good name is better than precious oil." The midrash taught that name of Bezalel was better than precious oil, as Exodus 35:30 proclaims his fame when it says, "See, the Lord has called by name Bezalel." (God proclaimed the name of Bezalel as the Divine architect, while Moses proclaimed the priest as such by anointing with oil.)

Reading the words, "see, the Lord has called by name Bezalel," in Exodus 35:30, a midrash explained that Israel sinned with fire in making the Golden Calf, as Exodus 32:24 says, "And I cast it into the fire, and there came out this calf." And then Bezalel came and healed the wound (and the construction of the Tabernacle made atonement for the sins of the people in making the Golden Calf). The midrash likened it to the words of Isaiah 54:16, "Behold, I have created the smith who blows the fire of coals." The midrash taught that Bezalel was the smith whom God had created to address the fire. And the midrash likened it to the case of a doctor's disciple who applied a plaster to a wound and healed it. When people began to praise him, his teacher, the doctor, said that they should praise the doctor, for he taught the disciple. Similarly, when everybody said that Bezalel had constructed the Tabernacle through his knowledge and understanding, God said that it was God who created him and taught him, as Isaiah 54:16 says, "Behold, I have created the smith." Thus, Moses said in Exodus 35:30, "see, the Lord has called by name Bezalel."

Exodus 35:30 identifies Bezalel's grandfather as Hur, whom either Abba Arikha or Samuel deduced was the son of Miriam and Caleb. A midrash explained that Exodus 35:30 mentions Hur because when the Israelites were about to serve the Golden Calf, Hur risked his life on God's behalf to prevent them from doing so, and they killed him. Whereupon God assured Hur that God would repay him for his sacrifice.

The midrash likened it to the case of a king whose legions rebelled against him, and his field marshal fought against the rebels, questioning how they could dare rebel against the king. In the end, the rebels killed the field marshal. The king reasoned that if the field marshal had given the king money, the king would have had to repay him. So even more so the king had an obligation to repay the field marshal when he gave his life on the king's behalf. The king rewarded the field marshal by ordaining that all his male offspring would become generals and officers.

Similarly, when Israel made the Golden Calf, Hur gave his life for the glory of God. Thus God assured Hur that God would give all Hur's descendants a great name in the world. And thus Exodus 35:30 says, "see, the Lord has called by name Bezalel, the son of Uri, the son of Hur."

Judah bar Ezekiel taught in the name of Abba Arikha that Exodus 35:31 indicated that God endowed Bezalel with the same attribute that God used in creating the universe. Judah said in the name of Abba Arikha that Bezalel knew how to combine the letters by which God created the heavens and earth. For Exodus 35:31 says (about Bezalel), "And He has filled him with the spirit of God, in wisdom and in understanding, and in knowledge," and Proverbs 3:19 says (about creation), "The Lord by wisdom founded the earth; by understanding He established the heavens," and Proverbs 3:20 says, "By His knowledge the depths were broken up."

A midrash taught that God considers studying the sanctuary's structure as equivalent to rebuilding it.

=== Exodus chapter 36 ===
Doing the math implied by Exodus 36:4, Exodus 38:22, Joshua 14:7, and 1 Chronicles 2:19–20, the Gemara deduced that in earlier generations, a boy of eight could father children. Exodus 38:22 reports that "Bezalel, son of Uri, son of Hur, of the tribe of Judah, made all that the Lord had commanded Moses," when they built the Tabernacle. And 1 Chronicles 2:19–20 reports that Caleb fathered the Hur who fathered Uri who fathered Bezalel. Exodus 36:4 reports that "wise men . . . wrought all the work of the Sanctuary," so Bezalel must have been at least 13 years old to have been a man when he worked on the Tabernacle. A Baraita taught that Moses made the Tabernacle in the first year after the Exodus, and in the second, he erected it and sent out the spies, so the Gemara deduced that Bezalel must have been at least 14 years old when Moses sent out the spies, the year after Bezalel worked on the Tabernacle. And Joshua 14:7 reports that Caleb said that he was 40 years old when Moses sent him to spy out the land. Thus, the Gemara deduced that Caleb was only 26 years older than his great-grandson Bezalel. Deducting two years for the three pregnancies needed to create the three intervening generations, the Gemara concluded that each of Caleb, Hur, and Uri must have conceived his son at the age of eight.

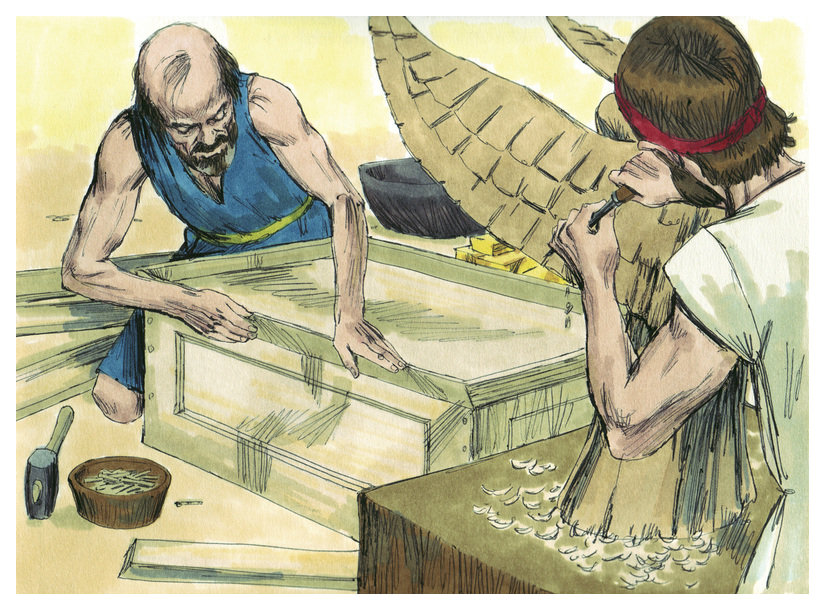
Bezalel made the Ark (1984 illustration by Jim Padgett, courtesy of Distant Shores Media/Sweet Publishing)

=== Exodus chapter 37 ===
A midrash taught that the righteous learn from God's example in creating the world that in beginning any work they should start with light. Thus when God told Moses to build the Tabernacle, Bezalel pondered with what thing he should begin. He concluded that he had better start with the Ark (in which the Israelites would deposit the Torah, the light of the world). And thus Exodus 37:1 commences the report of the construction of the Tabernacle's furnishings, "And Bezalel made the Ark."

Similarly, a midrash taught that when God told Moses to make the Tabernacle, he came to Bezalel and conveyed the command, and Bezalel asked what the purpose of the Tabernacle was. Moses replied that it was so that God might make God's Shechinah to dwell there and teach the Torah to Israel. Bezalel then asked where the Israelites would keep the Torah. Moses replied that when they had made the Tabernacle, they would then make the Ark. Then Bezalel said that since it would not be fitting for the Torah to be without a home, they should first make the Ark and then the Tabernacle. On that account, Exodus 37:1 associates Bezalel's name with the Ark, saying, "And Bezalel made the Ark."

Reading the words, "Bezalel made the Ark of acacia-wood," in Exodus 37:1, a midrash taught that God heals with the very thing with which God wounds. Thus, Israel sinned in Shittim (so called because of its many acacia trees), as Numbers 25:1 says, "And Israel abode in Shittim, and the people began to commit harlotry with the daughters of Moab" (and also worshipped the Baal of Peor). But it was also through Shittim wood, or acacia-wood, that God healed the Israelites, for as Exodus 37:1 reports, "Bezalel made the Ark of acacia-wood."

A Baraita taught that Josiah hid away the Ark referred to in Exodus 37:1–5, the anointing oil referred to in Exodus 30:22–33, the jar of manna referred to in Exodus 16:33, Aaron's rod with its almonds and blossoms referred to in Numbers 17:23, and the coffer that the Philistines sent the Israelites as a gift along with the Ark and concerning which the priests said in 1 Samuel 6:8, "And put the jewels of gold, which you returned Him for a guilt offering, in a coffer by the side thereof [of the Ark]; and send it away that it may go." Having observed that Deuteronomy 28:36 predicted, "The Lord will bring you and your king . . . to a nation that you have not known," Josiah ordered the Ark hidden away, as 2 Chronicles 35:3 reports, "And he [Josiah] said to the Levites who taught all Israel, that were holy to the Lord, ‘Put the Holy Ark into the house that Solomon the son of David, King of Israel, built; there shall no more be a burden upon your shoulders; now serve the Lord your God and his people Israel.’" Rabbi Eleazar deduced that Josiah hid the anointing oil and the other objects at the same time as the Ark from the common use of the expressions "there" in Exodus 16:33 with regard to the manna and "there" in Exodus 30:6 with regard to the Ark, "to be kept" in Exodus 16:33 with regard to the manna and "to be kept" in Numbers 17:25 with regard to Aaron's rod, and "generations" in Exodus 16:33 with regard to the manna and "generations" in Exodus 30:31 with regard to the anointing oil.

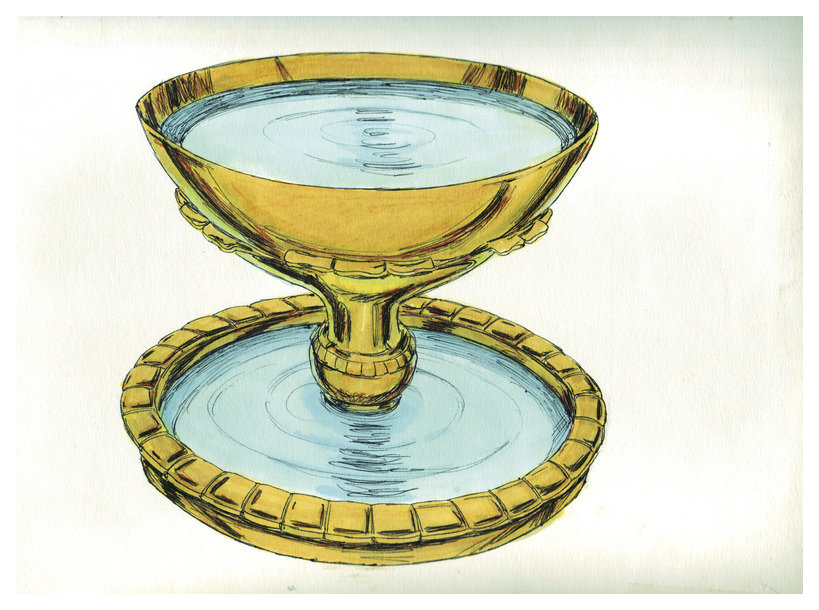
The Brass Laver (1984 illustration by Jim Padgett, courtesy of Distant Shores Media/Sweet Publishing)

=== Exodus chapter 38 ===
A midrash explained the mirrors of the women who "performed tasks" (הַצֹּבְאֹת, ha-tzovot) at the entrance of the Tent of Meeting in Exodus 38:8. The midrash told that when the Israelites were suffering hard labor in Egypt, Pharaoh decreed that they should not sleep at home or have sexual relations with their wives. Rabbi Shimon ben Halafta told that the Israelite women would go down to draw water from the river, whereupon God caused them to draw up small fish in their pitchers. The Israelite women would sell some of the fish, cook some of them, buy wine with the proceeds, and go out to the work fields to feed their husbands. After they had eaten, the Israelite women took their mirrors and looked into them together with their husbands. The wives would say that they were better looking than the husbands. The husbands would say that they were better looking. And in this way, they aroused their sexual desire and became fruitful and multiplied, as Exodus 1:7 reports, "And the children of Israel were fruitful and swarmed and multiplied and became exceedingly mighty." It was through the use of these mirrors that the Israelites were able to continue to have children even under the demands of harsh labor. When God told Moses to make the Tabernacle, all of the men came to contribute. Some brought silver, some brought gold or brass, onyx, and other gems to be set. They readily brought everything. The women brought the mirrors and presented them to Moses. When Moses saw the mirrors, he was furious with the women, saying that whoever brought the mirrors should be punished, asking what possible use they could have in the Tabernacle. God told Moses not to look down on them, for it was those mirrors that raised up all of the hosts of children born in Egypt. God thus directed Moses to take them and make from them the washbasin and its base for the priests.

== In medieval Jewish interpretation ==
The parashah is discussed in these medieval Jewish sources:

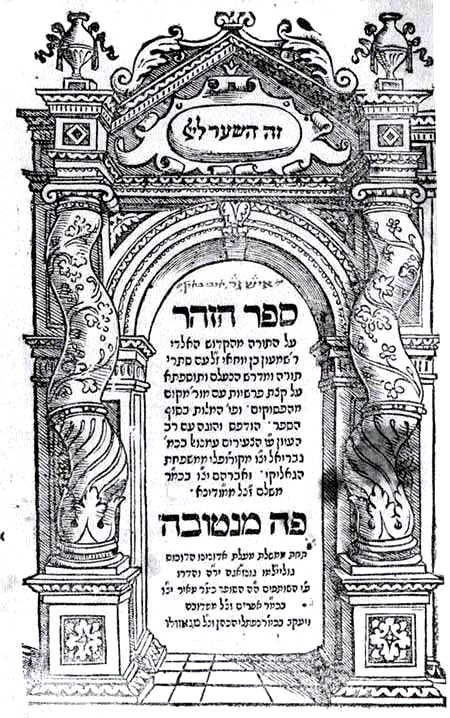
Zohar

=== Exodus chapter 35 ===
In the Zohar, Rabbi Jose expounded on Exodus 35:10: "And let every wise-hearted man among you come and make all that the Lord has commanded." Rabbi Jose taught that when God told Moses in Deuteronomy 1:13, "Get you wise men and men of discernment," Moses searched all of Israel but did not find men of discernment, and so in Deuteronomy 1:15, Moses said, "So I took the heads of your tribes, wise men, and full of knowledge," without mentioning men of discernment. Rabbi Jose deduced that the man of discernment (navan) is of a higher degree than the wise man (hacham), for even a pupil who gives new ideas to a teacher is called "wise." A wise man knows for himself as much as is required, but the man of discernment apprehends the whole, knowing both his own point of view and that of others. Exodus 35:10 uses the term "wise-hearted" because the heart was seen to be the seat of wisdom. Rabbi Jose taught that the man of discernment apprehends the lower world and the upper world, his own being and the being of others.

== In modern interpretation ==
The parashah is discussed in these modern sources:

=== Exodus chapters 35–39 ===
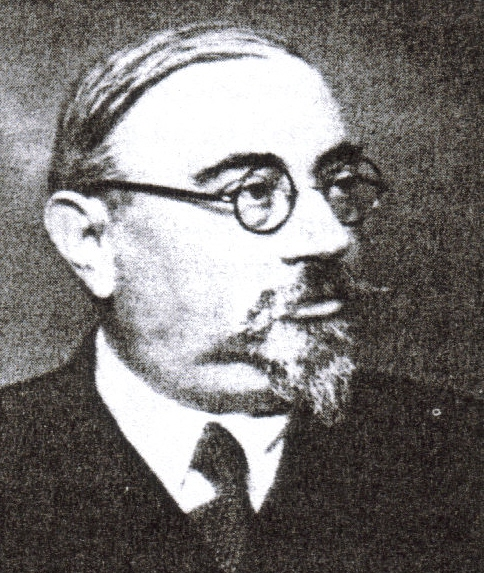
Cassuto

Noting that Exodus 35–39 repeats material from Exodus 25–31, Julius Popper argued that Exodus 35–39 was a later addition, and the Dutch Protestant theologian Abraham Kuenen and the German biblical scholar Julius Wellhausen agreed. But the mid-20th-century Italian-Israeli scholar Umberto Cassuto, formerly of the Hebrew University of Jerusalem, argued that this conjecture was ignorant of ancient Eastern literary style. Cassuto noted that the theme of the founding and building of a shrine was a set literary type in early Eastern writings, and such passages often first recorded the divine utterance describing the plan for the sanctuary and then gave an account of the construction that repeated the description given in the divine communication. Cassuto cited the Ugaritic epic of King Keret, which tells that in a dream, the king received from the god El instructions for the offering of sacrifices, the mustering of an army, the organizing of a military campaign to the land of King Pabel, and the request that Pabel's daughter or granddaughter be given him as a wife. After the instructions, the epic repeats the instructions, varying only the verb forms to the past tense, adding or deleting a conjunction, substituting a synonym, or varying the sequence of words—exactly as Exodus 35–39 does. Cassuto concluded that Exodus 35–39 was thus not a later addition, but required where it is by the literary style. Professor James Kugel of Bar Ilan University wrote that the detailed account must have held a fascination for ancient Israelites who viewed the Tabernacle as highly significant, as the structure that allowed God to reside in the midst of humankind for the first time since the Garden of Eden. And Gunther Plaut cautioned not to approach Exodus 35–39 with modern stylistic prejudices, arguing that a person of the ancient Near East—who was primarily a listener, not a reader—found repetition a welcome way of supporting familiarity with the text, giving assurance that the tradition had been faithfully transmitted.

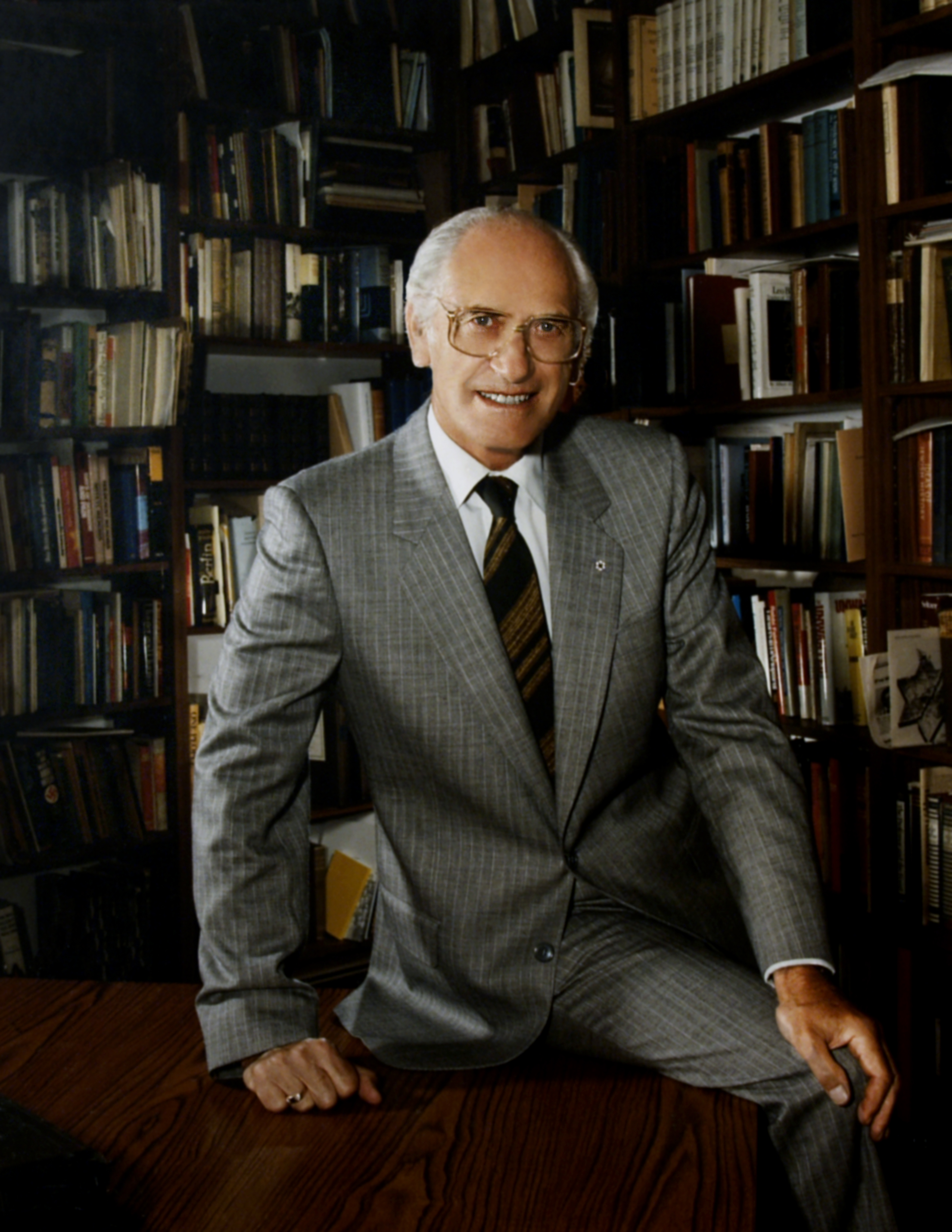
Plaut

=== Exodus chapter 35 ===
Plaut noted that this important chapter in Israel's wilderness story—the order to construct the Tabernacle—begins in Exodus 35:1 with the words "Moses then convoked" (וַיַּקְהֵל מֹשֶׁה, vayakheil Mosheh), heralding the conclusion of the cycle of apostasy and reconciliation that started in Exodus 32:1 with a word with the same spelling and root, "the people gathered themselves" (וַיִּקָּהֵל הָעָם, vayikheil ha-am). In Exodus 32:1, the people assembled to rebel against God's desires in the incident of the Golden Calf, but in Exodus 35:1, with an assembling (וַיַּקְהֵל, vayakheil) that God approved, God demonstrated God's forgiving grace.

Plaut noted that the command to observe the Sabbath in Exodus 35:2–3 preceded the account of the Tabernacle's construction just as it had been commanded at the end of the original instructions in Exodus 31:12–17, so the Sabbath was the bridge that connected the building of the Tabernacle with its deeper purpose. Nahum Sarna wrote that the injunction to observe the Sabbath in Exodus 35:2–3 practically repeats Exodus 31:15 verbatim, with an addition not to kindle fire on the Sabbath. The wording of this prohibition led the Rabbis of the Talmud to understand that fire may not be kindled on the Sabbath itself but may be lit before the Sabbath if not refueled on the Sabbath. The Karaites rejected this interpretation and spent the day without lights (although some later adherents did accept the Rabbinic practice). Sarna wrote that it was probably to demonstrate opposition to the early Karaite view that the Rabbis mandated lighting candles on Friday nights, and to that end, the Geonim (the post-Talmudic heads of the Babylonian academies) instituted the recital of a blessing over them.

Plaut argued that Exodus 35:3 includes the words "throughout your settlements" to make clear that the injunction not to kindle fire on the Sabbath applied not only to the primary prohibition during the building of the Tabernacle, but also in general. Thus Numbers 15:32, reporting a man gathering sticks on the Sabbath, recorded a violation of Exodus 35:3.

In 1950, the Committee on Jewish Law and Standards of Conservative Judaism ruled: “Refraining from the use of a motor vehicle is an important aid in the maintenance of the Sabbath spirit of repose. Such restraint aids, moreover, in keeping the members of the family together on the Sabbath. However where a family resides beyond reasonable walking distance from the synagogue, the use of a motor vehicle for the purpose of synagogue attendance shall in no wise be construed as a violation of the Sabbath but, on the contrary, such attendance shall be deemed an expression of loyalty to our faith. . . . [I]n the spirit of a living and developing Halachah responsive to the changing needs of our people, we declare it to be permitted to use electric lights on the Sabbath for the purpose of enhancing the enjoyment of the Sabbath, or reducing personal discomfort in the performance of a mitzvah.” In 2023, the Committee on Jewish Law and Standards reexamined the issue of driving on Shabbat and concluded that using an electric car for Shabbat purposes is not a violation of Shabbat, although the Committee encouraged walking or riding a bicycle, when possible.

Professor Carol Meyers of Duke University noted that both women and men provided the materials to which Exodus 25:1–9 and Exodus 35:4–29 refer, as Exodus 35:22 and 29 make clear, including fabrics made and donated by women craftspersons (as indicated in Exodus 35:25–26).

Jeffrey Tigay, professor emeritus at the University of Pennsylvania, argued that the word עֲבֹדָה, avodah, in Exodus 35:21, translated as "service" in the New Jewish Publication Society translation (as well as in Exodus 27:19; 30:16; 35:24; 36:1, 3, 5; and 39:40) is better rendered "labor" (referring to construction), as the materials contributed were for the construction of the Tabernacle, not for the worship that would be conducted there afterwards.

=== Exodus chapter 37 ===
Exodus 37:24 speaks of "a talent of pure gold." This table translates units of weight used in the Bible into their modern equivalents:

Weight Measurements in the Bible
Unit	Texts	Ancient Equivalent	Modern Equivalent
gerah (גֵּרָה)	Exodus 30:13; Leviticus 27:25; Numbers 3:47; 18:16; Ezekiel 45:12	1/20 shekel	0.6 gram; 0.02 ounce
bekah (בֶּקַע)	Genesis 24:22; Exodus 38:26	10 gerahs; half shekel	6 grams; 0.21 ounce
pim (פִים)	1 Samuel 13:21	2/3 shekel	8 grams; 0.28 ounce
shekel (שֶּׁקֶל)	Exodus 21:32; 30:13, 15, 24; 38:24, 25, 26, 29	20 gerahs; 2 bekahs	12 grams; 0.42 ounce
mina (maneh, מָּנֶה)	1 Kings 10:17; Ezekiel 45:12; Ezra 2:69; Nehemiah 7:70	50 shekels	0.6 kilogram; 1.32 pounds
talent (kikar, כִּכָּר)	Exodus 25:39; 37:24; 38:24, 25, 27, 29	3,000 shekels; 60 minas	36 kilograms; 79.4 pounds

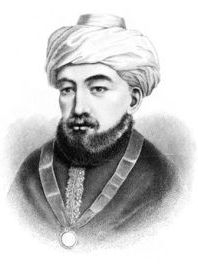
Moses Maimonides

== Commandments ==
According to Maimonides and Sefer ha-Chinuch, there is one negative commandment in the parashah:

- The court must not inflict punishment on the Sabbath.

== Liturgy ==
Following the Kabbalat Shabbat prayer service and prior to the Friday evening (Ma'ariv) service, Jews traditionally read rabbinic sources on the observance of the Sabbath, starting with Mishnah Shabbat 2:5. Mishnah Shabbat 2:5, in turn, interprets the laws of kindling lights in Exodus 35:3.

== Haftarah ==
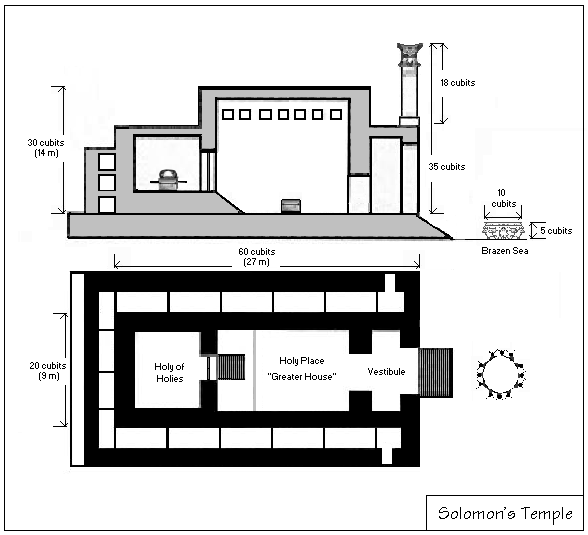
Solomon's Temple (2005 drawing by Mattes)

=== Parashat Vayakhel ===
When Parashat Vayakhel is read alone, the haftarah is:

- for Ashkenazi Jews: 1 Kings 7:40–50
- for Sephardi Jews: 1 Kings 7:13–26

==== Ashkenazi—1 Kings 7:40–50 ====
Both the parashah and the haftarah in 1 Kings 7 report the leader's erection of the holy place, Moses' building of the Tabernacle in the parashah, and Solomon's building of the Temple in Jerusalem in the haftarah. Both the parashah and the haftarah note particular metals for the holy space.

==== Sephardi—1 Kings 7:13–26 ====
Both the parashah and the haftarah note the skill (chokhmah), ability (tevunah), and knowledge (da‘at), of the artisan (Bezalel in the parashah, Hiram in the haftarah) in every craft (kol mela'khah).

==== Shabbat Shekalim ====
When Parashat Vayakhel coincides with the special Sabbath Shabbat Shekalim, (as it does in 2019), the haftarah is 2 Kings 12:1–17.

=== Parashat Vayakhel–Pekudei ===
When Parashat Vayakhel is combined with Parashat Pekudei, the haftarah is:

- for Ashkenazi Jews: 1 Kings 7:51–8:21
- for Sephardi Jews: 1 Kings 7:40–50

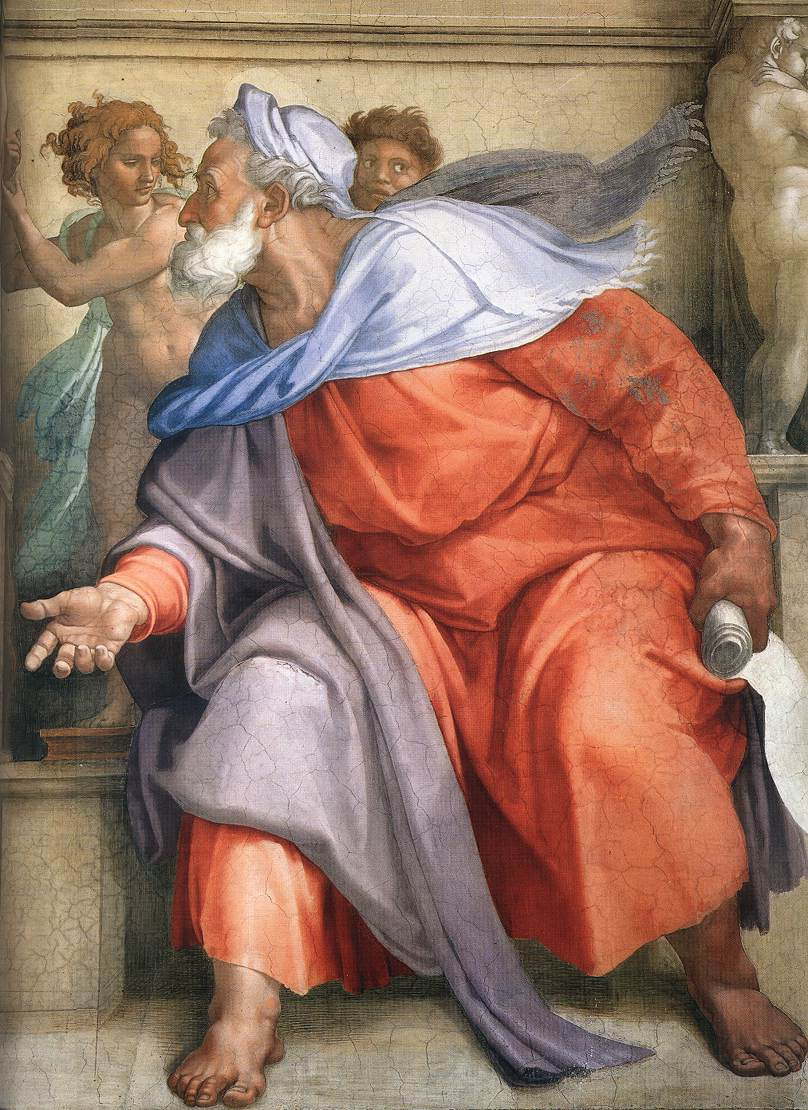
Ezekiel (1510 fresco by Michelangelo at the Sistine Chapel)

==== Shabbat HaChodesh ====
When the parashah coincides with Shabbat HaChodesh ("Sabbath [of] the month," the special Sabbath preceding the Hebrew month of Nisan (as it did in 2013 and 2017), the haftarah is:

- for Ashkenazi Jews: Ezekiel 45:16–46:18
- for Sephardi Jews: Ezekiel 45:18–46:15

On Shabbat HaChodesh, Jews read Exodus 12:1–20, in which God commands that "This month [Nissan] shall be the beginning of months; it shall be the first month of the year," and in which God issued the commandments of Passover. Similarly, the haftarah in Ezekiel 45:21–25 discusses Passover. In both the special reading and the haftarah, God instructs the Israelites to apply blood to doorposts.

==== Shabbat Parah ====
When the parashah coincides with Shabbat Parah (one of the special Sabbaths prior to Passover—as it did in 2025), the haftarah is:

- for Ashkenazi Jews: Ezekiel 36:16–38
- for Sephardi Jews: Ezekiel 36:16–36

On Shabbat Parah, the Sabbath of the red heifer, Jews read Numbers 19:1–22, which describes the rites of purification using the red heifer (parah adumah). Similarly, the haftarah in Ezekiel 36 also describes purification. In both the special reading and the haftarah in Ezekiel 36, sprinkled water cleansed the Israelites.
