= Mekhilta =

Mekhilta (Imperial Aramaic: מְכִילְתָּא, lit. 'measure'; Imperial Aramaic pronunciation: [/məˈχiltɑ/]), derived from the Mishnaic Hebrew term middah (מִדָּה, 'measure'), is used to denote a compilation of Jewish exegesis attributed to (or written by) a handful of members of Chazal (Hebrew: חֲזַ״ל).

There are three major Mekhiltas:

- The Mekhilta of Rabbi Ishmael (Jewish Babylonian Aramaic: מְכִילְתָּא דְּרַבִּי יִשְׁמָעֵאל), a midrash halakha on the book of Exodus attributed to Rabbi Ishmael.
- The Mekhilta of Rabbi Shimon ben Yochai (מְכִילְתָּא דְרַבִּי שִׁמְעוֹן בֶּן יוֹחָאי), a midrash halakha on the book of Exodus attributed to Rabbi Shimon ben Yochai.
- The Mekhilta le-Sefer Devarim (מְכִילְתָא לְסֵפֶר דְּבָרִים), a midrash halakha on the book of Deuteronomy that was edited in the third century BCE before going missing. Michal Bar-Asher Siegal, a Rabbinic Judaism scholar at Ben-Gurion University of the Negev, and Avi Shmidman, a lecturer at Bar-Ilan University, collaborated with Dicta to reconstruct the Mekhilta le-Sefer Devarim by employing computational textual analysis on Rabbi David ben Amram Adani's Midrash HaGadol, a 13th- or 14th-century Yemeni midrash aggadah.

== See also ==
- Midrash halakha, a mekhilta that is seen as binding
