= Mekhilta of Rabbi Ishmael =

Halakhic midrash to the Book of Exodus

The Mekhilta of Rabbi Ishmael (Jewish Babylonian Aramaic: מְכִילְתָּא דְּרַבִּי יִשְׁמָעֵאל IPA /məˈχiltʰɑ/, "a collection of rules of interpretation") is midrash halakha to the Book of Exodus. The Aramaic title Mekhilta corresponds to the Mishnaic Hebrew term מדה middā "measure," "rule", and is used to denote a compilation of exegesis (מדות middoṯ; compare talmudical hermeneutics). Other important mekhiltas were those of Shimon bar Yochai and on Book of Deuteronomy. The latter work was also associated with Rabbi Ishmael's teachings.

According to Steven Fine, both Sifra and the Mekhilta I. were concerned with the sanctification of early study houses after the destruction of the Second Temple.

== Authorship ==
The author or redactor of the Mekhilta cannot be definitely ascertained. Nissim ben Jacob and Samuel ibn Naghrillah refer to it as the Mekhilta de-Rabbi Yishmael, thus ascribing the authorship to Ishmael. Maimonides likewise says: "R. Ishmael interpreted from 've'eleh shemot' to the end of the Torah, and this explanation is called 'Mekhilta.' R. Akiva also wrote a Mekhilta." This Ishmael, however, is neither an amora by the name of Ishmael as Zecharias Frankel assumed, nor Judah ha-Nasi's contemporary, Ishmael ben Jose, as Gedaliah ibn Yahya ben Joseph thought. He is, on the contrary, Ishmael ben Elisha, Rabbi Akiva's contemporary, as is shown by the passage of Maimonides quoted above.

The present Mekhilta cannot, however, be the one composed by Ishmael, as is proved by the references in it to Ishmael's pupils and to other later tannaim. Both Maimonides and the author of the Halakhot Gedolot, moreover, refer, evidently based on a tradition, to a much larger mekhilta extending from Exodus 1 to the end of the Torah, while the midrash here considered discusses only certain passages of Exodus. It must be assumed, therefore, that Ishmael composed an explanatory midrash to the last four books of the Torah, and that his pupils amplified it.

A later editor, intending to compile a halakhic midrash to Exodus, took Ishmael's work on the book, beginning with ch. 12, since the first eleven chapters contained no references to the halakha. He even omitted passages from the portion which he took, but (by way of compensation) incorporated much material from the other halakhic midrashim, Sifra, the Mekhilta of Rabbi Shimon ben Yochai, and the Sifre to the Book of Deuteronomy. Since the last two works were from a different source, he generally designated them by the introductory phrase, "davar aḥer" = "another explanation," placing them after the sections taken from Ishmael's midrash. But the redactor based his work on the midrash of Ishmael's school, and the sentences of Ishmael and his pupils constitute the larger part of his Mekhilta. Similarly, most of the anonymous maxims in the work were derived from the same source, so that it also was known as the "Mekhilta of Rabbi Ishmael." The redactor must have been a pupil of Judah ha-Nasi, since the latter is frequently mentioned.

He cannot, however, have been Hoshaiah Rabbah, as Abraham Epstein assumes, as might be inferred from Abraham ibn Daud's reference, for Hoshaiah is mentioned in the Mekhilta. Abba Arikha therefore probably redacted the work, as Menahem ibn Zerah says. Abba Arikha however, did not do this in the talmudic academies in Babylonia (Lower Mesopotamia), as Isaac Hirsch Weiss assumes, but in Palestine, taking it after its compilation to Mesopotamia, so that it was called the Mekhilta of Palestine.

== Date ==
In 1968, Wacholder placed the composition of the Mekhilta in 8th-century Egypt whereas Neusner has stated he does not think there are firm methods for dating the text. In more recent work, the consensus has shifted to a significantly earlier date, with Stemberger, Kahane and others dating the final compilation to the third century. The earliest tractate contained within it, Neziqin, may be earlier still.

== Structure ==
The Mekhilta begins with Exodus 12, this being the first legal section found in Exodus. That this is the beginning is shown by the Nathan ben Jehiel and the Seder Tannaim v'Amoraim. In like manner, Nissim ben Jacob proves in his Mafteach to Shab. 106b that the conclusion of the Mekhilta which he knew corresponded with that of the Mekhilta now extant. In printed editions, the Mekhilta is divided into nine massektot, each of which is further subdivided into parashiyyot. The nine massektot are as follows:

1. "Massekta de-Pesah", covering the pericope "Bo", Exodus 12:1–13:16, and containing an introduction, "petikta," and 18 sections.
2. "Massekta de-Vayehi Beshalach", Exodus 13:17–14:31, containing an introduction and 6 sections.
3. "Massekta de-Shirah," (quoted as "Shirah"), Exodus 15:1–21, containing 10 sections.
4. "Massekta de-Vayassa," (quoted as "Vayassa"), Exodus 15:22–17:7, containing 6 sections.
5. "Massekta de-Amalek", consisting of two parts:
  1. the part dealing with Amalek (quoted as "Amalek"), Exodus 17:8–16, containing 2 sections.
  2. the beginning of the pericope "Yitro" (quoted as "Yitro"), Exodus 18:1–27, containing 2 sections.
6. "Massekta de-Bahodesh," (quoted as "Bahodesh"), Exodus 19:1–20,26, containing 11 sections.
7. "Massekta de-Nezikin," Exodus 21:1–22:23. (see next)
8. "Massekta de-Kaspa," Exodus 22:24–23:19; these last two messektot, which belong to the pericope "Mishpatim" contain 20 sections consecutively numbered, and are quoted as "Mishpatim"
9. "Massekta de-Shabbeta", containing 2 sections:
  1. covering the pericope "Ki Tissa", Exodus 31:12–17
  2. covering the pericope "Vayakhel" (quoted as "Vayakhel"), Exodus 35:1–3

The Mekhilta comprises altogether 77, or, if the two introductions be included, 79 sections. All the editions, however, state at the end that there are 82 sections.

== Aggadic elements ==
Although the redactor intended to produce a halachic midrash to Book of Exodus, the majority of the Mekhilta is aggadic in character. From Exodus 12 the midrash was continued without interruption as far as Exodus 33:19, i.e. to the conclusion of the chief laws of the book, although there are many narrative portions scattered through this section whose midrash belongs properly to the aggadah. Furthermore, many aggadot are included in the legal sections as well.

The halakhic exegesis of the Mekhilta, which is found chiefly in the massektot "Bo", "Bahodesh", and "Mishpatim" and in the sections "Ki Tisa" and "Vayakhel", is, as the name "mekhilta" indicates, based on the application of the middot according to R. Ishmael's system and method of teaching. In like manner, the introductory formulas and the technical terms are borrowed from his midrash. On the other hand, there are many explanations and expositions of the Law which follow the simpler methods of exegesis found in the earlier halakha.

The aggadic expositions in the Mekhilta, which are found chiefly in "Beshallah" and "Yitro" are in part actual exegesis, but the majority of them are merely interpretations of Scripture to illustrate certain ethical and moral tenets. Parables are frequently introduced in connection with these interpretations as well as proverbs and maxims. Especially noteworthy are the aggadot relating to the battles of the Ephraimites and to Serah, Asher's daughter, who showed Joseph's coffin to Moses, besides others, which are based on old tales and legends.

Some of the tannaim mentioned in the Mekhilta are referred to only here and in Sifre Numbers, which likewise originated with R. Ishmael's school. On the earlier editions of the Mekhilta and the commentaries to it see I.H. Weiss and M. Friedmann.

== Reception ==
The Babylonian and Jerusalem Talmud do not mention this work; the Sifra and the Sifre do not mention it either. However, one passage in the extant version of the Mekhilta, Mishpatim may know of it in the following reference: "R. Josiah showed a Mekhilta from which he cited and explained a sentence." The text quoted by R. Josiah can be found. There is some controversy over whether the word "mekhilta" refers to the work under consideration, or a baraita collection that might also be designated as a mekhilta.

On the other hand, this midrash, apparently in written form, is mentioned several times in the Talmud under the title She'ar Sifre debe Rav "The Other Books of the Schoolhouse". Barayata from the Mekhilta are introduced in the Babylonian Talmud by the phrases Tana debe R. Yishmael ("It was taught in the school of R. Ishmael"), and in the Jerusalem Talmud and the aggadahs by Teni R. Yishmael ("R. Ishmael taught"). Yet there are many barayata in the Talmud which contain comments on Book of Exodus introduced by the phrase Tana debe R. Yishmael but which are not included in the Mekhilta under discussion. These must have been included in Ishmael's original Mekhilta, and the fact that they are omitted in this midrash is evidence that its redactor excluded many of the passages from Ishmael's work.

A geonic responsum in which appears a passage from the Mekhilta likewise indicates that this work was known as She'ar Sifre debe Rav. The first individual to mention the Mekhilta by name was the author of the Halakhot Gedolot.

Another geonic responsum refers to the text as the Mekhilta of Palestine, probably to distinguish it from the Mekhilta of Rabbi Shimon ben Yochai, which was generally known in the Babylonian academies.

== Translations ==
- Lauterbach, Jacob Z. (1961) [First published 1933], Mekilta de-Rabbi Ishmael: A Critical Edition on the Basis of the Manuscripts and Early Editions with an English Translation, Introduction, and Notes, Philadelphia: Jewish Publication Society.

== See also ==
- Midrash
- Mekhilta of Rabbi Shimon ben Yochai
- Mekhilta le-Sefer Devarim
