= Joseph Shalit Riqueti =

Jewish-Italian scholar

Joseph Shalit ben Eliezer Riqueti (Richetti) was a Jewish-Italian scholar born at Safed, and who lived in the second half of the 17th century at Verona, where he directed a Talmudic school. He was the author of Ḥokmat ha-Mishkan or Iggeret Meleket ha-Mishkan (Mantua, 1676), on the construction of the First Temple. He also published a map of Palestine which Zunz supposes to have been prepared as one of the illustrations of a Passover Haggadah.

Besides his own works Joseph edited Ḥibbur Ma'asiyyot (Venice, 1646), a collection of moral tales, and Gershon ben Asher's Yiḥus ha-Ẓaddiḳim, to which he added notes of his own (Mantua, 1676). He is possibly the earliest author to mention the Midrash ha-Gadol, although it is not clear whether he was referring to the Yemenite work currently known by that title.

== Jewish Encyclopedia bibliography ==
- Graziadio Nepi-Mordecai Ghirondi, Toledot Gedole Yisrael, p. 213;
- Zunz, in Asher's edition of Benjamin of Tudela's Massa'ot, ii. 286;
- Moritz Steinschneider, Cat. Bodl. col. 1526;
- Marco Mortara, Indice, p. 54.
