= Isaac Elijah Landau =

Russian rabbi

Isaac Elijah ben Samuel Landau (1801–December 6, 1876) was a Jewish-Russian preacher, exegete, and communal worker born at Vilna. At the age of 18 he settled at Dubno, his wife's native town, where he carried on a prosperous business. On Saturdays and holy days he used to preach in the synagogues, attracting large audiences. Owing to his eloquence Landau was chosen by the communities of Volhynia as member of the rabbinical commission appointed by the emperor in 1861, which necessitated his remaining for five months in St. Petersburg. In 1868 he was called to Vilna as preacher and dayan, which office he held till his death. At Vilna he established a kosher kitchen for Jewish soldiers.

== Works ==
Landau was a recognized authority in rabbinical matters, and many authors solicited his approbation of their works. He himself was a prolific writer, and was the author of the following commentaries:

- Ma'aneh Eliyahu (Vilna, 1840), on the Tanna debe Eliyahu, accompanied with notes on other subjects under the title Siaḥ Yiẓḥaḳ
- A double commentary on the Mekhilta (ib. 1844): Berurei haMiddot, on the text, and Mitzui haMiddot, glosses to the Biblical and Talmudic passages quoted in the commentary
- Patshegen (ib. 1858), on Proverbs
- Miḳra Soferim (Suwalki, 1862), on Masseket Soferim
- Dober Shalom (Warsaw, 1863), on the daily prayers
- Kiflayim leTushiyyah, on the twelve Minor Prophets (only that on Joel published, Jitomir, 1865) and on Psalms (Warsaw, 1866)
- Patshegen haDat, on the Five Scrolls (Vilna, 1870) and on the Pentateuch (ib. 1872–75)
- Aḥarit leShalom (ib. 1871), on the Pesaḥ Haggadah
- Derekh Ḥayyim (ib. 1872), on Derek Ereẓ Zuṭa
- Lishmoa' kaLimmudim (ib. 1876), on the aggadah of the talmudists
- Simlah Ḥadashah, on the Maḥzor (published in the Vilna editions of the Maḥzor)

Landau published also Derushim le-Kol Ḥefẓehem (ib. 1871–77), a collection of sermons; and two of his funeral orations: Ḳol Shaon (Vilna, 1872; also translated into the Russian language), on the wife of Prince Potapov; and Ebel Kabed (Eydtkuhnen, 1873), on Samuel Straschun. He left besides a number of works still unpublished as of 1906.
