= Midrash HaGadol =

14th century compilation of midrashim

Midrash HaGadol or The Great Midrash (Hebrew: מדרש הגדול) is a work of aggaddic midrash, expanding on the narratives of the Torah, which was written by David ben Amram Adani of Yemen (14th century).

Its contents were compiled from the Jerusalem and Babylonian Talmud and earlier midrashic literature of tannaitic provenance. In addition, the compiler of the midrash borrows quotations from the Targums, Maimonides, and Kabbalistic writings, Avot of Rabbi Natan, Pesikta Rabbati, Pesikta de-Rav Kahana, Pirke Rabbi Eliezer, Mishnat Rabbi Eliezer [b. Rabbi Yose ha-Galili], and in this aspect is unique among the various midrashic collections.

This important work, the largest of the midrashic collections, came to popular attention in the late 19th century through the efforts of Jacob Saphir, Solomon Schechter and David Zvi Hoffmann. In addition to containing midrashic material that is not found elsewhere, such as part of the Mekhilta of Rabbi Shimon ben Yochai. Most of the Mekhilta of Rabbi Shimon ben Yochai is found in the Midrash HaGadol, which, heretofore, has only been available in scattered and fragmented manuscripts. The Midrash HaGadol, along with the other extant fragmented manuscripts, were used by scholars to reconstruct the ancient Mekhilta. Midrash HaGadol contains what are considered to be more correct versions of previously known Talmudic and midrashic passages.

== Discovery and publication ==
The existence of the Midrash HaGadol was first brought to the attention of Jewish scholarship by Jacob Saphir, who in his Even Sapir (1866) reports seeing a manuscript of the work in the possession of the Chief Rabbi of Yemen. His remarks about the "discovery" are reproduced in Fisch (1940), where he describes a work on the entire Torah containing "twice as much as our Midrash Rabbah". While this collection was new to European Jewry, it was probably well known to the Yemenite Jews.

The first manuscript was brought from Yemen to Jerusalem and then to Berlin in 1878 by Mr Saphir, and this midrash subsequently became the subject of much scholarly attention. There are currently approximately two hundred manuscripts of this work residing in various public and private Hebraica collections, according to the catalog of the Institute of Microfilmed Hebrew Manuscripts.

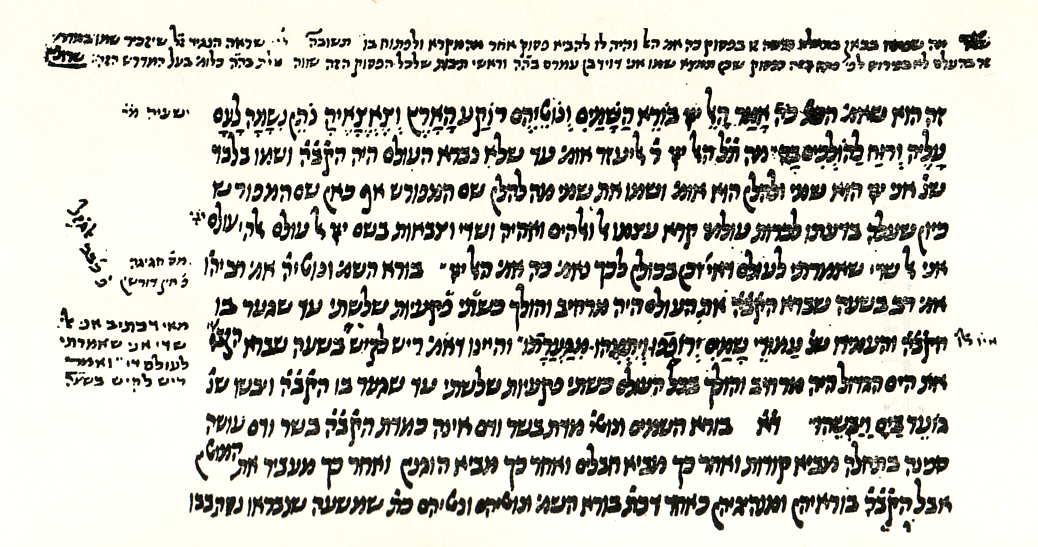
Manuscript page from Midrash HaGadol on Genesis.

The Midrash HaGadol on Genesis was first published by Solomon Schechter in 1902. A large portion of Midrash HaGadol on Exodus was then published by David Zvi Hoffmann in 1913. Midrash HaGadol on Book of Numbers was published by S. Fisch in 1940 in a more accessible style than the previous efforts, which were principally arranged for a scholarly audience. More recent editions listed by Strack & Stemberger (1991) are those on Genesis and Exodus by M. Margulies (1967), on Leviticus by E.N. Rabinowitz (1932) and Adin Steinsaltz (1975), on Numbers by E.N. Rabinowitz (1973), and on Deuteronomy by S. Fisch (1972). The Mossad Harav Kook in Jerusalem has also published a five-volume edition.

== Authorship ==
According to Higger (1934), the work dates to the late 14th century. A discussion of its authorship is provided in Fisch (1940), wherein he reviews the evidence in favor of the three then-prevailing opinions regarding authorship of the Midrash HaGadol, variously that it is the work of Maimonides' son, Rabbi Abraham Maimonides, which opinion follows that of Yiḥyah Salaḥ (an opinion disputed in later generations), or else compiled by David bar Amram al-Adani.

After discounting Maimonides as a possible author, and reviewing some compelling factors in favor of the other two possible authors, Fisch (1940) offers the conciliatory hypothesis that the work was composed in Judeo-Arabic by Abraham Maimonides and translated into Hebrew by David al-Adani. While Fisch offers possible explanations for how the work, if indeed authored by Abraham Maimonides in Egypt, came first to be "lost" and then to be rediscovered in Yemen, Strack & Stemberger (1991) find the attribution to Abraham Maimonides "only extremely weakly attested," and report that modern scholars almost uniformly attribute the work in its entirety to David bar Amram al-Adani. S. Fisch concedes this as well in his Encyclopaedia Judaica article on the topic.

== Sources ==
The Midrash HaGadol contains material from Mekhilta of Rabbi Shimon ben Yochai , Sifri Zutta, Mekhilta le-Sefer Devarim, Mekhilta of Rabbi Ishmael, Sifre, and other unknown midrashic sources. In addition, the midrash makes use of the work of Maimonides and Isaac Alfasi, as well as many geonic writings, but the sources are never cited, a unique characteristic of this midrash. All these various sources are fused in such a way that the product is a new literary creation in which the original ingredients can frequently not be unambiguously discriminated. In addition, the sourcebook used by Moses Gaster to compile his work, The exempla of the rabbis (Sefer Ma'asiyot), was known to the author of Midrash Ha-Gadol and made use of it.

A "Midrash HaGadol that was brought from Aden" is cited by Joseph Shalit Riqueti in Sefer Chochmat HaMishkan (1676), but it is not known whether this is the same as this Midrash HaGadol.

== Bibliography ==
- Fisch, S. (1940), Midrash Haggadol on the Pentateuch: Numbers (English), London: Manchester University Press.
- Higger, Michael (1934), "The Midrash ha-Gadol to Leviticus", Jewish Quarterly Review, 25 (2): 161–170, doi:10.2307/1451712, JSTOR 1451712
- Oesterley, W. O. E.; Box, G. H. (1920), A Short Survey of the Literature of Rabbinical and Mediæval Judaism, New York: Burt Franklin
- Strack, H.L.; Stemberger, G. (1991), Introduction to the Talmud and Midrash, Edinburgh: T&T Clark, ISBN 978-0-8006-2524-5
