= Meir Friedmann =

Austro-Hungarian Jewish scholar (1831–1908)

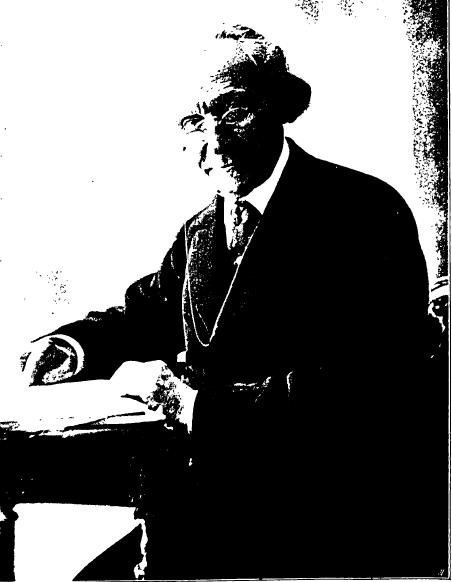
Meir Friedmann

Meir Friedmann (Ish-Shalom) (10 July 1831 in Kraszna (Slovak: Kružná), district of Kashau (Košice Region), Kingdom of Hungary, Austrian Empire – 1908 in Vienna, Austria-Hungary) was an Austrian-Hungarian Jewish scholar. His editions of the Midrash are the standard texts. His chief editions were the Sifre (1864), the Mekhilta (1870), Pesiqta Rabbathi (1880). At the time of his death he was editing the Sifra. Friedmann, while inspired with regard for tradition, dealt with the Rabbinic texts with modern scientific methods, and rendered conspicuous service to the critical investigation of the Midrash and to the history of early homilies.

== Biography ==
In 1844, at the age of 13, he entered the yeshiva at Ungvar, Carpathian Ruthenia region (now part of Ukraine) and studied with Meir Eisenstaedter (also called Meir Asch). There, he was attracted to Chasidism and Kabbalah. At the age of sixteen, he was led by the "Bi'ur" of Moses Mendelssohn to the study of the Bible, and became deeply interested in Hebrew poetry, especially in Wessely's "Shire Tife'ret". At twenty, while living at Miskolc, where he earned his livelihood by giving Talmud instruction, he took up secular studies. In 1858 he entered the University of Vienna. In 1864, when the Vienna bet ha-midrash was founded, he was chosen as teacher of the Bible and Midrash. Later he was hired as a professor in the Israelitisch-Theologische Lehranstalt. Among his students there was Solomon Schechter.

== Works ==
Friedmann has devoted himself chiefly to the editing of old Midrashim, to which he has added critical notes and valuable introductions. These notes, written in classical rabbinical style, are models of precision and are of great value.

- Friedmann has published the following works in Hebrew:

- The Sifre, Vienna, 1864
- The Mekilta, ib. 1870
- Eshet Chayil, a commentary on Proverbs, ib. 1878
- The Pesikta Rabbati, ib. 1880
- Ha-Tziyyon, a rational interpretation of Ezekiel, ib. 1882
- Dabar 'al Odot ha-Talmud, on the question whether the Talmud can be accurately translated, ib. 1885
- Masseket Makkot, a critical edition of the Talmudical treatise Makkot, with a commentary, ib. 1888
- Sefer Shofetim, notes to Judges, ib. 1891
- Me'ir 'Ayin, a commentary on the Passover Haggadah, ib. 1895
- Tanna debe Eliyahu, ib. 1900

- Friedmann's German publications are:

- Worte der Erinnerung an Isaac Noa Mannheimer, ib. 1873
- Die Juden ein Ackerbautreibender Stamm, ib. 1878
- T. G. Stern, Gedenkrede, ib. 1883
- Zerubabel, German explanation of Isaiah, ib. 1890
- "Worte zur Feier des 100 Jahrigen Geburtstages des Seligen Predigers Isaac Noa Mannheimer", 1893
- "Onkelos und 'Akylos," ib. 1896

- From 1881 to 1886 Friedmann published, together with Isaac Hirsh Weiss, the monthly Bet Talmud, devoted to rabbinical studies. To this periodical Friedmann contributed, under the signature "Ish Shalom", many valuable essays, of which the most noteworthy are on the arrangement of the Pentateuch and on Samuel.

== Bibliography ==
=== Jewish Encyclopedia Bibliography ===
- Brainin, in Luach Ahiasaf, pp. 343 et seq., 1901
- Ha-Shiloach, p. 573, 1901
- Solomon Schechter, in Jew. Chron. p. 17, June 28, 1901

=== Additional bibliography ===
- An MA on his works by Rabbi Binyamin Zeev Benedict
