= Midrash halakha =

Ancient Judaic rabbinic method of Torah study

Midrash halakha (Hebrew: מִדְרָשׁ הֲלָכָה) was the ancient Judaic rabbinic method of Torah study that expounded upon the traditionally received 613 Mitzvot (commandments) by identifying their sources in the Hebrew Bible, and by interpreting these passages as proofs of the laws' authenticity.

The term midrash halakha is also applied to the derivation of new laws, either by means of a correct interpretation of the obvious meaning of scriptural words themselves or by the application of certain hermeneutic rules.

The word midrash is rooted in the term drash, literally "seek," or "enquire," but practically meaning exposition. Midrash is then "that which has been expounded," or more simply, a work focused on rabbinic exposition (of the Torah or of Torah-based laws and ethics). The word is applied only to compilations of Tannaic midrash or to the Tannaic exposition process.

However, the common term midrash used by itself has come to be a shorthand for the term midrash aggadah which, in contrast to midrash halakha, are non-legal tannaic expositions that are based on the Bible. Midrash halakha is not aggadic, sometimes resulting in confusion with the common shorthand meaning of midrash. Instead, the product of midrash halakha are legal works, primarily Mishnah and Beraisa.

== Terminology ==
The phrase "Midrash halakha" was first employed by Nachman Krochmal, the Talmudic expression being Midrash Torah meaning "investigation of the Torah". These interpretations were often regarded as corresponding to the real meaning of the scriptural texts; thus, it was held that a correct elucidation of the Torah carried with it the proof of the halakha and the reason for its existence.

== Types ==
In the midrash halakha three divisions may be distinguished:

- The midrash of the older halakha, that is, the midrash of the Soferim and the Tannaim of the first two generations;
- The midrash of the younger halakha, or the midrash of the Tannaim of the three following generations;
- The midrash of several younger Tannaim and of many Amoraim who did not interpret a biblical passage as an actual proof of the halakha, but merely as a suggestion or a support for it (zekher le-davar; asmakhta).

=== The Midrash of the older halakha ===
The older halakha sought only to define the compass and scope of individual laws, asking under what circumstances of practical life a given rule was to be applied and what would be its consequences. The older midrash, therefore, aims at an exact definition of the laws contained in the scriptures by an accurate interpretation of the text and a correct determination of the meaning of the various words. The form of exegesis adopted is frequently one of simple lexicography, and is remarkably brief.

A few examples will serve to illustrate the style of the older midrash halakha. It translates the word ra'ah (Exodus 21:8) as "displease" (Mekhilta, Mishpatim), which is contrary to the interpretation of Rabbi Eliezer. From the expression be-miksat (Exodus 12:4), which, according to it, can mean only "number," the older halakha deduces the rule that when killing the Passover lamb the slaughterer must be aware of the number of persons who are about to partake of it.

The statement that the determination of the calendar of feasts depends wholly on the decision of the Nasi and his council is derived from Leviticus 23:37, the defectively written otam (them) being read as attem (you) and the interpretation, "which you shall proclaim," being regarded as conforming to the original meaning of the phrase. When two different forms of the same word in a given passage have been transmitted, one written in the text (ketib), and the other being the traditional reading (qere), the halakha, not wishing to designate either as wrong, interprets the word in such a way that both forms may be regarded as correct. Thus it explains Leviticus 25:30-where according to the qere the meaning is "in the walled city," but according to the ketib, "in the city that is not walled"-as referring to a city that once had walls, but no longer has them. In a similar way it explains Leviticus 11:29. According to Krochmal, the ketib was due to the Soferim themselves, who desired that the interpretation given by the halakha might be contained in the text; for example, in the case of otam and attem noted above, they intentionally omitted the letter vav.

=== The Midrash of the younger halakha ===
The younger halakha did not confine itself to the mere literal meaning of single passages, but sought to draw conclusions from the wording of the texts in question by logical deductions, by combinations with other passages, etc. Hence its midrash differs from the simple exegesis of the older halakha. It treats the Bible according to certain general principles, which in the course of time became more and more amplified and developed (see Talmud); and its interpretations depart further and further from the simple meaning of the words.

A few examples will illustrate this difference in the method of interpretation between the older and the younger halakhah. It was a generally accepted opinion that the first Passover celebrated in Egypt, that of the Exodus, differed from those that followed it, in that at the first one the prohibition of leavened bread was for a single day only, whereas at subsequent Passovers this restriction extended to seven days. The older halakha represented by R. Jose the Galilean, bases its interpretation on a different division of the sentences in Exodus 13 than the one generally received; connecting the word ha-yom (= "this day", the first word of verse 13:4) with verse 13:3 and so making the passage read: "There shall no leavened bread be eaten this day." The younger halakha reads ha-yom with verse 13:4, and finds its support for the traditional halakha by means of the principle of semukot (collocation); that is to say, the two sentences, "There shall no leavened bread be eaten," and "This day came ye out," though they are separated grammatically, are immediately contiguous in the text, and exert an influence over each other. What the older halakha regarded as the obvious meaning of the words of the text, the younger infers from the collocation of the sentences.

The wide divergence between the simple exegesis of the older halakha and the artificiality of the younger is illustrated also by the difference in the method of explaining the Law, cited above, in regard to uncleanness. Both halakhot regard it as self-evident that if a man is unclean, whether it be from contact with a corpse or from any other cause, he may not share in the Passover. The younger halakha, despite the dot over the ה, reads rechokah and makes it refer to derekh ("road" or "way") even determining how far away one must be to be excluded from participation in the feast. However, to find a ground for the halakha that those who are unclean through contact with other objects than a corpse may have no share in the Passover, it explains the repetition of the word ish in this passage (Leviticus 9 10) as intending to include all other cases of defilement.

Despite this difference in method, the midrashim of the older and of the younger halakha alike believed that they had sought only the true meaning of the scriptures. Their interpretations and deductions appeared to them to be really contained in the text; and they wished them to be considered correct biblical expositions. Hence they both have the form of scriptural exegesis, in that each mentions the biblical passage and the halakha that explains it, or, more correctly, derives from it.

=== Abstract and Midrash halakha ===
It is to a law stated in this form—i.e., together with the biblical passage it derives from—that the name midrash applies, whereas one that, though ultimately based on the Bible, is cited independently as an established statute is called a halakha. Collections of halakhot of the second sort are the Mishnah and the Tosefta; compilations of the first sort are the halakhic midrashim. This name they receive to distinguish them from the haggadic midrashim, since they contain halakhot for the most part, although there are haggadic portions in them. In these collections the line between independent halakha and midrash halakha is not sharply drawn.

Many mishnayot (single paragraph units) in the Mishnah and in the Tosefta are midrashic halakhot. On the other hand, the halakhic midrashim contain independent halakhot without statements of their scriptural bases. This confusion is explained by the fact that the redactors of the two forms of halakhot borrowed passages from one another.

=== The schools of R. Akiva and R' Ishmael ===
Since the halakhic midrashim had for their secondary purpose the exegesis of the Bible, they were arranged according to the text of the Pentateuch. As Genesis contains very little matter of a legal character, there was probably no halakhic midrash to this book. On the other hand, to each of the other four books of the Pentateuch there was a midrash from the school of Rabbi Akiva and one from the school of Rabbi Ishmael, and these midrashim are still in great part extant. The halakhic midrash to Exodus from the school of R. Ishmael is the Mekilta, while that of the school of R. Akiva is the Mekilta of R. Shimon bar Yochai, most of which is contained in Midrash ha-Gadol.

A halakhic midrash to Leviticus from the school of R. Akiva exists under the name "Sifra" or "Torat Kohanim." There was one to Leviticus from the school of R. Ishmael also, of which only fragments have been preserved. The halakhic midrash to Numbers from the school of R. Ishmael is the "Sifre"; while of that of the school of R. Akiva, the Sifre Zutta, only extracts have survived in Yalkut Shimoni and Midrash HaGadol. The middle portion of the Sifre to Deuteronomy forms a halakhic midrash on that book from the school of R. Akiva, while another from the school of R. Ishmael has been shown by Hoffmann to have existed. This assignment of the several midrashim to the school of R. Ishmael and to that of R. Akiva respectively, however, is not to be too rigidly insisted upon; for the Sifre repeats in an abbreviated form some of the teachings of the Mekilta, just as the Mekilta included in the Midrash HaGadol has incorporated many doctrines from Akiba's midrash.

Midrashic halakhot found also scattered through the two Talmuds; for many halakhic baraitot (traditions in oral law) that occur in the Talmuds are really midrashic, recognizable by the fact that they mention the scriptural bases for the respective halakhot, often citing the text at the very beginning. In the Jerusalem Talmud the midrashic baraitot frequently begin with ketib (= "It is written"), followed by the scriptural passage. From the instances of midrashic baraitot in the Talmud that are not found in the extant midrashim, the loss of many of the latter class of works must be inferred.

=== The midrash of several younger Tannaim and of many Amoraim ===
The midrash which the Amoraim use when deducing tannaitic halakhot from the scriptures is frequently very distant from the literal meaning of the words. The same is true of many explanations by the younger tannaim. These occur chiefly as expositions of such halakhot as were not based on scripture but which it was desired to connect with or support by a word in the Bible. The Talmud often says of the interpretations of a baraita: "The Biblical passage should be merely a support" (asmachta). Of this class are many of the explanations in the Sifra and in the Sifre. The tanna also often says frankly that he does not cite the biblical word as proof ("re'aya"), but as a mere suggestion ("zecher"; lit. "reminder") of the halakah, or as an allusion ("remez") to it.

== See also ==
- Rabbinic literature
