= Nehunya ben HaKanah =

1st century rabbi, Jewish tanna known for his meekness

Nehunya ben HaKanah (Hebrew: נחוניה בן הקנה, romanized: Nəḥunyā ben haqQānā) was a tanna of the 1st and 2nd centuries.

It appears from Bava Batra 10b that Nehunya was a contemporary, but not a pupil, of Yohanan ben Zakkai. He was the teacher of Ishmael ben Elisha. Nehunya was rich and had a large retinue of servants; but he was distinguished for his meekness and forgiving nature, to which he attributed his attainment of great age; two short prayers composed by him exhibit the same qualities.

According to Johanan bar Nappaha in Shevu'ot 26a, Nehunya interpreted the entire Torah by the hermeneutic rule known as the "general and particular" (kelal ufrat), a rule which his pupil Rabbi Ishmael made the eighth of his 13 hermeneutic rules. Nehunya is frequently mentioned in the Talmud; in Hullin 129b he is referred to disagreeing with Eliezer ben Hurcanus and Joshua ben Hananiah regarding a halakhah. In a post-Talmudic text, he said that the Pharaoh of the Exodus was rescued from the Red Sea, that he repented, that he afterward reigned in Nineveh, and that it was he who in the time of Jonah exhorted the inhabitants of Nineveh to repentance. Nehunya is known also for his ethical saying: "Whoever accepts upon him the yoke of the Torah, from him is removed the yoke of royalty and that of worldly care; and whoever throws off the yoke of the Torah, upon him is laid the yoke of royalty and that of worldly care".

As Rabbi Ishmael, Nehunya's disciple, is regarded by the kabbalists as their chief representative, Nehunya is considered to have been Ishmael's teacher in mysticism also. He is generally supposed to have been the author of the daily prayer beginning Ana BeKoach, the initials of which form the forty-two-lettered name of God. He is also supposed by some to have been the author of the Bahir, Sefer haTemunah, and of the Sefer ha-Peli'ah.

== Jewish Encyclopedia bibliography ==
- W. Bacher, Ag. Tan. i. 54–56;
- Z. Frankel, Darke ha-Mishnah, p. 99;
- Rabbi Jehiel ben-Szlomo Heilprin, Seder ha-Dorot, ii.;
- Moritz Steinschneider, Cat. Bodl. cols. 2056 et seq.
