= Sifre =

Either of two works of classical Jewish legal biblical exegesis

Sifre (Hebrew: סִפְרֵי; siphrēy, Sifre, Sifrei, also, Sifre debe Rab or Sifre Rabbah) refers to either of two works of Midrash halakha, or classical Jewish legal biblical exegesis, based on the biblical books of Numbers and Deuteronomy.

== The Talmudic era Sifre ==
The title Sifre debe Rav (lit. "the books of the school of Abba Arikha") is used by Chananel ben Chushiel, Isaac Alfasi, and Rashi; it occurs likewise in Makkot 9b.

The 8th century author of Halachot Gedolot names four "exegetical books belonging to the Scribes" (Heb. Midrash sofrim) and which, in all appearances, seem to refer to "Sifre debe Rav" and which comprised the following compositions: 1) Genesis Rabbah 2) Mekhilta of Rabbi Shimon ben Yochai (on Exodus), 3) Sifrei (on Numbers) and 4) Sifrei (on Deuteronomy).

Regarding the reference in Sanhedrin 86a to the Sifre of Rabbi Simeon, see Mekhilta of Rabbi Shimon ben Yochai; the question has likewise been raised whether, given the well-known close relation that existed between the school of Shimon bar Yochai and that of Rabbi Ishmael, the words וכלהו אליבא דר"ע apply to Rabbi Simeon's Sifre in the same degree as to the other works mentioned in this Talmudic passage.

== The present Sifre ==
Such questions, however, are unimportant in reference to the Sifre now extant; for this work is certainly not identical with the Talmudic Sifre; and, on closer investigation, it is found to be not a uniform work, but one composed of parts which did not originally belong together. Zecharias Frankel drew attention to the difference between that portion of the Sifre which refers to Numbers and that which refers to Deuteronomy, although he misunderstood this difference and consequently arrived at false conclusions. David Hoffmann has correctly defined the relation between the two in his Zur Einleitung in die Halachischen Midraschim.

=== Sifre to Numbers ===
The Sifre to Numbers is evidently a midrash which originated in Rabbi Ishmael's school, and which has all the characteristics of such a work. It follows the same principles of exposition as does the Mekhilta; the same group of tannaim appears, and the same technical terms are employed. There are also many material points of similarity with the Mekhilta. The aggadic portions likewise contain many parallel passages.

It is especially noteworthy that the explanation in Sifre of the sotah law corresponds with a view expressed by Rabbi Ishmael (and also with the prescribed halakha), that one witness being sufficient to convict, the ordeal of the bitter water is not necessary. The explanation given in the Sifre to Numbers thus contradicts the explanation in Soṭah 31a and in Sifre, Deut. 188. The view expressed in the Babylonian Talmud is curious, for it cites the explanation of the Sifre to Numbers, and adds thereto: ואמר רחמנא תרי לית בה אלא חד והיא לא נתפשה אסורה, whereas the deduction should read to the contrary, תרי לית בה אלא חד היתה שותה. The Babylonian Talmud, which evidently does not know Rabbi Ishmael's view, tries to interpret the baraita in the sense of the prescribed halakha. But the baraita must in fact be interpreted in the opposite sense, namely, as following the view of Rabbi Ishmael, who, because עד always implies "two," as appears from Jerusalem Talmud Soṭah 20d, demands also in the case of a woman charged with adultery two witnesses of the alleged crime.

The passage introduced by the phrase סתם ספרי (Sifre 161) = "an anonymous Sifre," likewise echoes Rabbi Ishmael's views; and the same is true of Sifre 21 as compared with Sifre 7. The beginning of Sifre 7 appears to be, strangely enough, an anonymous halakha expressing the opposite opinion, though this also may at need be harmonized with Rabbi Ishmael's view. Sifre 39 likewise follows Rabbi Ishmael's view, according to Hullin 49a. These and other less cogent reasons seem to indicate that the Sifre to Numbers originated in Rabbi Ishmael's school, although this does not exclude the assumption that the editor in addition borrowed much from Shimon bar Yochai's midrash and other less-known midrashim.

Among the tannaim appearing in the Sifre to Numbers are:

- Rabbi Ishmael and his pupils Rabbi Josiah and Rabbi Jonathan
- Nathan the Babylonian
- Abba Jose ben Hanan (citing Eliezer)
- Eliezer ben Hurcanus
- Rabbi Akiva and his pupils Shimon bar Yochai and Judah bar Ilai
- Less frequently, Rabbi Meir and Jose ben Halafta
- Judah the Prince also is often mentioned here, as in other midrashic works
- Judah ben Bathyra, who, as David Hoffmann says, is more frequently mentioned in midrashic works from Rabbi Ishmael's school than in any others.
- A sentence of the amora Samuel ben Nahman is quoted once (No. 73).

=== Sifre to Deuteronomy ===
The Sifre to Deuteronomy is of an entirely different nature. The main portion (Nos. 53-303), halakhic in character, is preceded and followed by aggadic parts, and it has all the characteristics of a midrash from the school of Rabbi Akiva. The principles underlying the exposition are the same as those in Sifra. The term mufneh in the application of the principle gezerah shavah occurs only once, and is to be regarded as a later addition. The technical terms are largely the same in both midrashim, different terms being found only here and there in the Sifre. Moreover, the group of tannaim is different from that of the Mekhilta le-Sefer Devarim (Mekhilta to Deuteronomy). Those frequently mentioned in the latter (Rabbi Josiah, Rabbi Jonathan, Nathan the Babylonian, and Rabbi Isaac) are mentioned rarely in the Sifre; and even then their names are evidently later additions. Many passages quoted as being anonymous correspond with Rabbi Akiva's views.

Similarly, some halakhic differences between the Sifre and the Mekhilta may be pointed out. All these points indicate that the Sifre to Deuteronomy originated in Rabbi Akiva's school; and, as several anonymous passages may be cited to express the views of Shimon bar Yochai, this midrash may with a fair degree of certainty be ascribed to him. Such anonymous passages are found in Sifre 72–74, several sections of which Makkot 17a identifies as Shimon bar Yochai's interpretations. The same appears to be the case in Sifre 94, compared with Sanhedrin 112a; ib. 103 with Kiddushin 57a; ib. 121 with Sanhedrin 46b. Sifre 166, and perhaps also 165, likewise correspond with Shimon bar Yochai's views; while in Sifre 303 the explanation of לא בערתי ממנו בטמא, and the omission of בכורים, also imply an agreement therewith.

There are, however, some exceptions to the rule. Sifre 230 likewise contradicts Shimon bar Yochai's view, according to Kil'ayim 7:7. But, since it has not been claimed that the Sifre to Deuteronomy represents Shimon bar Yochai's midrash in its original form, these few exceptions prove nothing. The editor certainly drew upon other midrashic works besides Shimon bar Yochai's midrash, especially upon that of Rabbi Ishmael, as appears from a comparison with the Mekhilta to Deuteronomy, as well as from the fact that several passages introduced by תנא [דבי] ר"י occur in the Sifre.

Sifre 107, however, by no means corresponds with the passage תני ר"י in Jerusalem Talmud Eruvin 20c, but rather expresses the opposite view. Sifre, Deut. 171, s.v. ד"א, corresponds perhaps with Megillah 25a, s.v. תנא דבי ר"י; and Sifre 104 with the view of Rabbi Ishmael in Mek., Mishpaṭim, 201, according to the correct reading of Yalkut Shimoni, which has ר"י instead of ר"ש. It thus appears that the editor introduces the midrashim from Rabbi Ishmael's midrash with the phrase ד"א. David Hoffmann concludes from Pesachim 68a and 71a that the editors of the Babylonian Talmud possessed the Sifre in another edition than the present one, which he takes to be a Palestinian edition. But the former passage indicates merely that the Amoraim occasionally had not memorized the baraitot perfectly, an instance of inaccuracy with regard to the Sifre being evident in Hullin 74a.

=== Final redaction ===
The final redaction of the Sifre must have been undertaken in the time of the Amoraim, since some of them, e.g., Rabbai Bannai and Rabbi Jose ben Ḥanina, are mentioned therein. Both the Sifre to Numbers and that to Deuteronomy are divided into sections.

It may be said in general of the Sifre to Numbers and also of that to Deuteronomy that they are defective in many passages, and that the Amoraim probably possessed more trustworthy copies. Even Rashi and the Lekach Tov quote from the Sifre passages which are no longer extant. While the middle, halakhic portion of the Sifre to Deuteronomy belongs to Akiva's school, the aggadic portions preceding and following it seem to come from works of R. Ishmael's school. This appears clearly in the first part, which shows many formal and material similarities with the Mekhilta. In regard to the latter portion, it may be said that Sifre, Deut. 344 reproduces R. Ishmael's view on the question at issue. As for the halakhic midrash, it may be said that, in contradistinction to the aggadic part, the collector used, aside from R. Ishmael's midrash, that of R. Simeon.

== Quotation by Raymundus Martini ==
The Christian polemicist Raymundus Martini in the 13th century claimed in his Pugio Fidei that Sifre contained the following passage, which is however not present in any modern copy:

Go and learn the merit of Messiah the King, and the reward of the righteous from the first Adam, on whom was laid only one commandment of a prohibitive character, and he transgressed it. See how many deaths were appointed on him, and on his generations, and on the generations of his generations to the end of all generations. But which attribute is the greater - the attribute of goodness or the attribute of punishment (retribution)? He answered, the attribute of goodness is the greater, and the attribute of punishment the less. And Messiah the King, who was chastened and suffered for the transgressors, as it is said, “He was wounded for our transgressions,” and so on, how much more shall he justify (make righteous, by his merit) all generations; and this is what is meant when it is written, “And the Lord made to meet upon him the sin of us all."

== Editions and translations ==
The earliest extant edition of the Sifre is that of Venice, 1545. Other editions are: Hamburg, 1789; Sulzbach, 1802; with commentary by David Pardo, Salonica, 1804; with commentary by Abraham Lichtstein (זרא אברהם), part i., Dyhernfurth, 1811; part ii., Radwill, 1820; ed. Friedmann, Vienna, 1864.

A Latin translation of the Sifre is found in Biagio Ugolini, Thesaurus, vol. xv. A modern English translation is that of Jacob Neusner, Sifre to Numbers (1986) and Sifre to Deuteronomy (1987). Reuven Hammer translated the sections related to Deutoronomy in "Sifre: A Tannaitic Commentary on the Book of Deuteronomy" (1987). A recent English translation was published by Marty Jaffee, and can be read online.
