= Rabbi Ishmael =

2nd century CE rabbi and sage

Rabbi Yishmael ben Elisha Nachmani (Hebrew: רבי ישמעאל בן אלישע), often known as Rabbi Yishmael and sometimes given the title "Ba'al HaBaraita" (Hebrew: בעל הברייתא, “Master of the Outside Teaching”), was a rabbi of the 1st and 2nd centuries (third generation of tannaim) CE.

== Life ==
He was a descendant of a wealthy priestly family in Upper Galilee. His year of birth was 90 CE. He was captured by the Romans as a young boy, but redeemed by R' Joshua ben Hananiah. R' Nehunya ben HaKanah became his teacher, and he remained a close colleague of Rabbi Joshua. He is likely the grandson of the high priest of the same name. He was born in Kfar Aziz, south of Hebron.

Some suppose that he was among the martyrs of Betar. The more generally received opinion, however, is that one of the martyrs was a namesake (Rabbi Ishmael's death is mentioned in Nedarim 9:10).

According to tradition, his burial place is at Parod in the Galilee.

== Disposition ==
Yishmael's teachings were calculated to promote peace and goodwill among all: "Be indulgent with the hoary head;" he would say, "and be kind to the black-haired [the young]; and meet every man with a friendly countenance".

What he taught he practised. Even toward strangers, he acted considerately. When a non-Jew greeted him, he answered kindly, "Your reward has been predicted"; when another abused him, he repeated coolly, "Your reward has been predicted." This apparent inconsistency, he explained to his puzzled disciples by quoting Genesis 27:29: "Cursed be one who curses you, and blessed be one who blesses you".

He was fatherly to the indigent, particularly to poor and plain maidens, whom he clothed attractively and provided with means, so that they might obtain husbands.

One Friday night, while absorbed in the study of the Bible, he inadvertently turned the wick of a lamp; and he vowed that when the Temple was rebuilt, he would offer there an expiatory sacrifice.

== Views on marriage ==
Yishmael opposed the refusal of the ultra-patriotic to beget children under the Roman sway. Even under the conditions then existing, he recommended early marriage. He said, "The Scripture tells us, 'Thou shalt teach them [the things thou hast seen at Horeb] to thy sons and to thy sons' sons;' and how may one live to teach his sons' sons unless one marries early?"

== Halakhic exegesis ==
Yishmael gradually developed a system of halakhic exegesis which, while running parallel with that of Rabbi Akiva, is considered the more logical of the two. Indeed, Yishmael established the principles of the logical method by which laws may be deduced from laws and important decisions founded on the plain phraseology of the Scriptures. Like Akiva, he opened up a wide field for halakhic induction, but, unlike Akiva, he required more than a mere jot or a letter as a basis for making important rulings.

Yishmael was of opinion that the Torah was conveyed in the language of man, and that therefore a seemingly superfluous word or syllable cannot be used as a basis for new deductions. In discussing a hypothetical case with Akiva, he once exclaimed, "Wilt thou indeed decree death by fire on the strength of a single letter?" He considered the plain sense of the Scriptural text, irrespective of its verbal figures, to be the only safe guide.

=== Hermeneutic rules ===
To consistently carry out his views in this direction, Ishmael formalized a set of 13 hermeneutic rules by which halakha was derived from the Torah. As a basis for these rules he took the seven rules of Hillel, and on them built up his own system, which he elaborated and strengthened by illustrating them with examples taken from the Scriptures. Even these rules, he would not permit to apply to important questions, such as capital cases in which no express Scriptural warrant for punishment existed; he would not consent to attach a sentence of death, or even a fine, to a crime or misdemeanor on the strength of a mere inference, however logical, where no such punishment is clearly stated in Scripture or to draw a rule from a law itself based on an inference. His rules were universally adopted by his successors, tannaim, as well as amoraim, although occasionally he himself was forced to deviate from them.

== Aggadah ==
He had a reputation for greatness in aggadah. Yishmael laid the foundation for the halakhic midrash on Exodus, the Mekhilta; and a considerable portion of the similar midrash, the Sifre on Numbers, appears also to have originated with him or in his school, known as "Bei R. Ishmael".

Regarding the question of whether future punishment will be limited to the spirit or to the body, or whether either one in fact merits punishment (since neither can sin when separated from the other), Ishmael draws the following parallel:

A king, owning a beautiful orchard of luscious fruit, and not knowing whom to trust in it, appointed two invalids—one lame, and the other blind. The lame one, however, tempted by the precious fruit, suggested to his blind companion that he ascend a tree and pluck some; but the latter pointed to his sightless eyes. At last the blind man raised his lame companion on his shoulders, and thus enabled him to pluck some of the fruit. When the king came, noticing that some fruit had disappeared, he inquired of them which was the thief. Vehemently asserting his innocence, each pointed to the defect which made it impossible for him to have committed the theft. But the king guessed the truth, and, placing the lame man on the shoulders of the other, punished them together as if the two formed one complete body. Thus, added Ishmael, will it be hereafter: soul and body will be reunited and punished together.

== See also ==
- 3 Enoch
