= Baraita =

Teachings "outside" of the six orders of the Mishnah

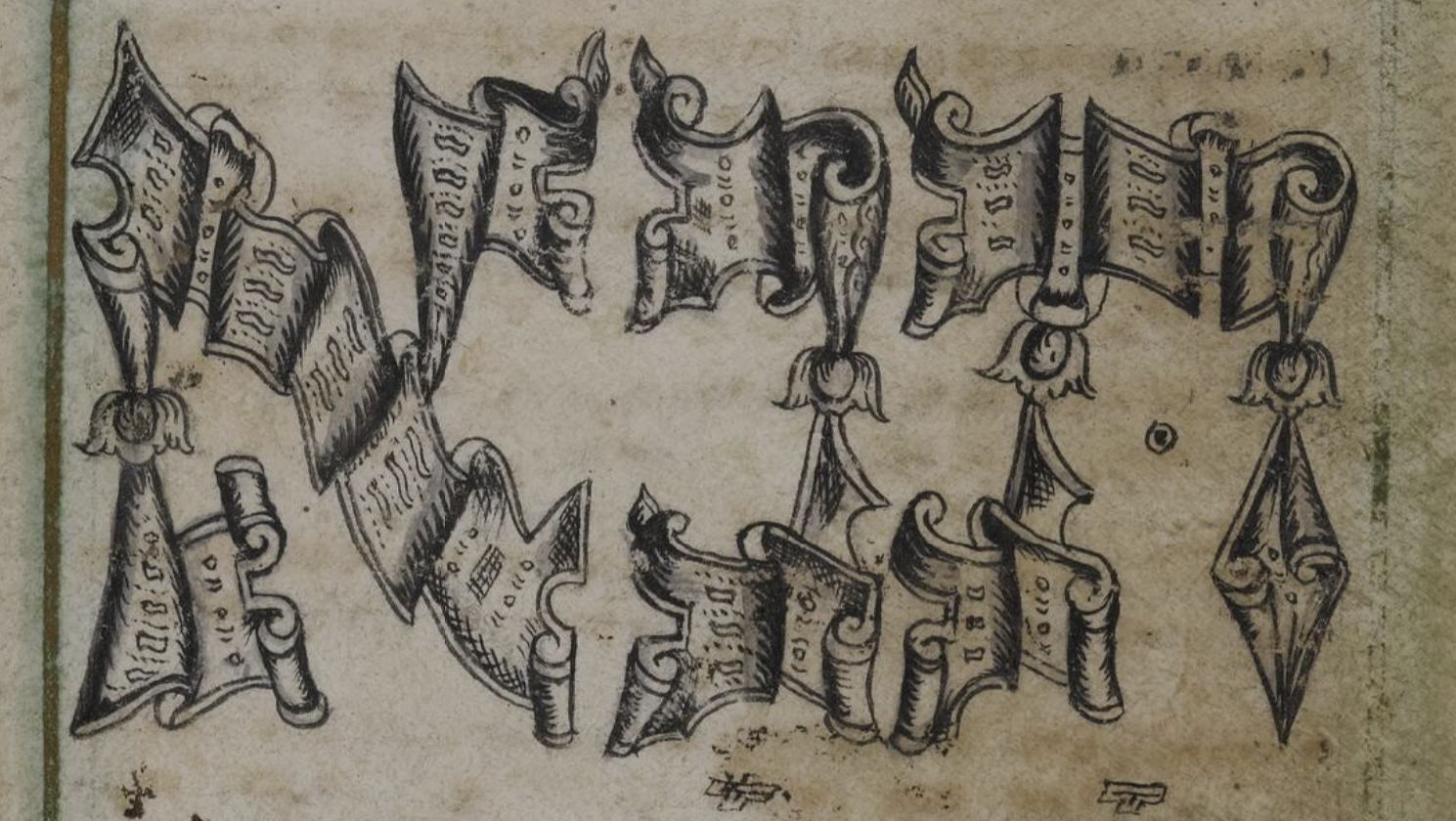
Tanna, the introductory word of a baraita, in a 1743 prayerbook.

Baraita (Jewish Babylonian Aramaic: בָּרַיְתָא, romanized: bārayṯā "external" or "outside"; pl. bārayāṯā or in Hebrew baraitot; also baraitha, beraita; Ashkenazi pronunciation: berayse) designates a tradition in the Oral Torah of Rabbinical Judaism that is not incorporated in the Mishnah. Baraita thus refers to teachings "outside" of the six orders of the Mishnah. Originally, "Baraita" probably referred to teachings from schools outside the main Mishnaic-era yeshivas – although in later collections, individual barayata are often authored by sages of the Mishna (Tannaim).

According to Maimonides' Introduction to Mishneh Torah, the barayata were compiled by Hoshaiah Rabbah and Bar Kappara, although no other compilation was passed down that was similar to the Tosefta.

Because the Mishnah encapsulates the entire Oral Law in a purposely compact form (designed to both facilitate and necessitate oral transmission), many variant versions, additional explanations, clarifications and rulings were not included in the Mishnah. These were later compiled in works called barayata, often in the form of a list of teachings by one sage. Barayata can thus also designate collections of such traditions. The main collections of barayata are the Tosefta and the Halakhic Midrashim (Mekhilta, Sifra and Sifre).

The authority of the barayata is somewhat less than that of the Mishnah. Nevertheless, these works are the basic "proof-text" cross-referenced by the Talmudic sages in their analysis and interpretation of the Mishna; see Gemara. Here, a teaching from the baraita is usually introduced by the Aramaic words tanya "It was orally taught", tana, or tanu rabanan "Our Rabbis have orally taught", whereas tnan "We have orally taught" introduces quotations from the Mishnah. Anonymous barayata are often attributed to particular tannaim by the Talmud. In the Jerusalem Talmud, references to the baraita are less common.

The style of the baraita is basically indistinguishable from that of the Mishna, but some come closer to Mishnaic idiom than others. For example, the second chapter of Kallah Rabbathi, a baraita compilation, is often appended to Pirkei Avot, as both are similar in style and content.

== See also ==
- Gemara
- Midrash
- Talmud
