= Yom-Tov Lipmann-Muhlhausen =

Yom-Tov Lipmann ben Solomon Mühlhausen (Hebrew: יום טוב ליפמן מילהאוזן) was a controversial Talmudist, Kabbalist and Jewish philosopher of the 14th and 15th centuries (birth date unknown, died later than 1420). His religious and scholarly career and influence spanned the Jewish communities of Bohemia, Poland, Austria and various parts of Germany, and his dispute with the principles of Christianity left a lasting imprint on the relations between Christianity and Judaism.

== Biography ==
There is no comprehensive account of his life and career, which must be reconstructed from fragmentary references. According to Stephan Bodecker, Bishop of Brandenburg, who wrote a refutation of Lipmann's Sefer Nitzachon, Lipmann lived at Kraków. Naphtali Hirsch Treves, in the introduction to his Siddur, calls him "Lipmann Mülhausen of Prague", adding that he lived in the part of the town called "Wyschigrod." Manuscript No. 223 in the Halberstam collection contains a document issued at Prague in 1413 and signed by Lipmann Mülhausen as dayyan.

Yom-Tov was his religious given name, Lipmann was his secular given name, one of the traditional Ashkenazic vernacular equivalents for Yom-Tov, while his last name is a nickname indicating his or his ancestors' origin from the town of Mühlhausen, in Thuringia.

It is seen from his Sefer Nitzachon that, besides his rabbinical studies, Lipmann occupied himself with the study of the Hebrew Bible, that he was acquainted with Karaite literature, that he read the New Testament, and that he knew Latin. His authority in rabbinical matters is shown by his circular to the rabbis warning them against the use of any shofar not made of a ram's horn. There are also responsa addressed to him by Jacob ben Moses Mölln, and Israel Isserlein mentions him as one of five scholars who met at Erfurt.

On 16 August 1399, Lipmann and many other Jews were thrown into prison at the instigation of a converted Jew named Peter, who accused them of insulting Christianity in their works. Lipmann was ordered to justify himself, but while he brilliantly refuted Peter's accusations, as a result of the charges, seventy-seven Jews were martyred on 22 August 1400, and three more, by fire, on 11 September 1400. Of the accused, Lipmann alone escaped death.

== Works ==
Lipmann was the author of:

- Sefer haNitzachon, a refutation of Christianity and Karaism and a demonstration of the superiority of rabbinical Judaism.
- Zikhron Sefer haNitzachon, a refutation of Christianity, an abstract in verse of Sefer haNitzachon; A. Geiger declares Lipmann's authorship of this poem doubtful.
- A commentary to the Shir haYichud (Freiburg, 1560)
- In Samson ben Eleazar's Barukh sheAmar (Shklov, 1804) there is a kabbalistic treatise on the Hebrew alphabet, entitled Sefer Alfa Beta, the author of which is given as מהר"ל שלי"ו. S. Sachs and Steinschneider concluded that the author was Lipmann-Mülhausen. This work discusses:
1. the form of the letters
2. the reason for their form
3. the mystery of their composition, order, and numerical value, and
4. the kabbalistic explanation of their form

In this work the author frequently mentions a kabbalistic work entitled Sefer ha-Eshkol and a commentary to the Sefer Yetzirah .

- Menachem Zioni's Tzefunei Tziyyoni is ascribed, in a pamphlet quoted by Reuben ben Hoshke to a certain R. Tabyomi, whom Steinschneider identifies with Lipmann-Mülhausen.
- Lipmann promises a commentary to Pirkei Avot, but such a work is not extant.
- Manuscript 820 in Oppenheimer's collection was supposed to be a Biblical commentary by the author of Sefer haNitzachon, but Dukes declares that it is only Sefer HaNitzachon itself.

== Sefer HaNitzachon ==
Lipmann's reputation is dependent, mainly, upon his Sefer HaNitzachon (ספר ניצחון). The book aimed to deal with the acute problems of conversion to Christianity among German Jews. That a rabbi in the 15th century should occupy himself with the Latin language and the New Testament was certainly a rare thing. Lipmann was compelled to justify himself (§3) by referring to the saying of Rabbi Eliezer, "Know what thou shalt answer to the heretic".

The whole work consists of 354 paragraphs, the number of days in the lunar year. Each paragraph, with the exception of the last eight, begins with a passage from the Bible, upon which the author derives his argument. Thus his arguments rest upon 346 passages taken from all the books of the Old Testament. The last eight paragraphs contain his dispute with the convert Peter.

In the introduction, Lipmann says that he divided the work into seven parts to represent the seven days of the week. The part for the first day contains the arguments against Christians; those for the second day against the Karaite interpretation of the Bible; those for the remaining five days contain several interpretations of obscure Biblical passages that are likely to mislead students; the reasons for the commandments; arguments against atheists; arguments against the Karaites and their rejection of the Talmud; and an account of the sixteen things which comprise the whole of Judaism and which, after being indicated in the Pentateuch, are repeated in the Prophets and Hagiographa.

Very characteristic is Lipmann's refutation of the assumed miraculous birth of Jesus, as well as his demonstration of the falsity of the conclusions of the Christians who claim that the birth of Jesus was foretold by the Prophets. He constantly quotes Maimonides, Abraham ibn Ezra, Nahmanides, Saadia, Rashi, Shemariah of Negropont, and other ancient scholars. Lipmann must have written Sefer HaNitzachon before 1410, for he expressed a hope that the Messiah would arrive in that year

The work was the first to recount a Christian response to the ritual of Elijah's chair.

=== Translations and refutations ===
Sefer HaNitzachon was long inaccessible to Christian Hebraists, and a copy was only obtained in 1644 by a deceitful ruse, involving outright theft, by the professor of Hebrew at the University of Altdorf, Theodoricus Hackspan, who learning that a rabbi in Schnaittach possessed a copy, obtained an interview with him for a debate, and when the rabbi took down his copy to consult, had it snatched from his hands, to be then copied and printed. It is this copy which forms the editio princeps. Johann Christoph Wagenseil published, at the end of his Sota (Altdorf-Nuremberg, 1674), corrections of Hackspan's edition under the title of Correctiones Lipmannianæ.

Later, Sefer HaNitzachon was reprinted, with the addition of Ḳimḥi's Vikkuach, in Amsterdam (1709 and 1711) and Königsberg (1847). Sebald Schnell published the Hebrew text with a Latin translation and refutation of the paragraph (§8) denying the miraculous birth of Jesus (Altdorf, 1645), and at various dates he published Latin translations of the paragraphs directed against Christianity. A Latin translation of the whole work, with the exception of the passages taken from the Pentateuch, was made by Johann Heinrich Blendinger (Altdorf, 1645). As will be readily understood, the work gave rise to many polemics and called forth replies from Christians. The first was Stephan Bodecker, Bishop of Brandenburg, a younger contemporary of Lipmann, who wrote a refutation of Sefer HaNitzachon. The following other refutations are published: Wilhelm Schickard, Triumphator Vapulans sive Refutatio, etc. (Tübingen, 1629); Stephen Gerlow, Disputatio Contra Lipmanni Nizzachon (Königsberg, 1647); Christian Schotan, Anti-Lipmanniana (Franeker, 1659), giving also the Hebrew text of Sefer HaNitzachon. Informally, Anti-Lipmanniana came to be used also as an overall term for the entire corpus of Christian writings debating with and seeking to refute Lipmann's arguments.
