= Joseph ben Abraham Gikatilla =

Spanish Kabbalah writer (1248-c.1305)

Joseph ben Abraham Chiquitilla (Hebrew: יוסף בן אברהם ג'יקטיליה, Spanish: Chiquitilla, "the very little one") (born 1248 in Medinaceli; died after 1305 in Peñafiel) was a Castilian kabbalist. Gikatilla, who was at first greatly influenced by Abraham Abulafia's ecstatic, prophetic system of kabbalism, soon showed a greater affinity for philosophy. Gikatilla made an original attempt to provide a detailed yet lucid and systematic exposition of kabbalism. He was also the originator of the doctrine equating the infinite, Ein Sof, with the first of the ten Sefirot. The conception was rejected by the majority of kabbalists from the 16th century onward, but his works continued to be highly esteemed and were published in many editions. His writings reflect the numerous intellectual currents that converged in Castile in the last third of the 13th century and formed a unique milieu for Jewish mysticism in the late Middle Ages. His works, especially his major work, Sha'arei Orah (Gates of Light, before 1293), had a profound influence on the later development of both Jewish and Christian mysticism.

In different manuscripts of the work the author's name is variously written "Gribzul," "Karnitol," and "Necatil," all corruptions of "Gikatilla."

== Biography ==
Iberian Peninsula with Medinaceli in the Central March

Gikatilla was born in Medinaceli, Kingdom of Castile, in 1248, but worked primarily in Segovia. Between approximately 1272 and 1274, he studied under Abraham Abulafia, the founder of the 'ecstatic Kabbalah', who considered him his most successful student.

His kabbalistic knowledge became so profound that he was supposed to be able to work miracles, and on this account was called "Joseph Ba'al ha-Nissim" (the Thaumaturge or literally Master of Miracles; Zacuto, Yuḥasin, p. 224a). Like his master, Gikatilla occupied himself with mystic combinations and transpositions of letters and numbers; indeed, Abulafia considered him as the continuator of his school (Adolf Jellinek, B.H. iii, p. xl). But Gikatilla was not an adversary of philosophy; on the contrary, he tried to reconcile philosophy with kabbalah, declaring that the latter is the foundation of the former. He, however, strove after the higher science, that is, mysticism. His works in general represent a progressive development of philosophical insight into mysticism. His first work shows that he had considerable knowledge of secular sciences, and that he was familiar with the works of Ibn Gabirol, Abraham ibn Ezra, Maimonides, and others.

G. propagated the idea of the "inverted metaphor," which did not describe God with human attributes, but named human limbs according to their divine correspondents, and is also often found in Arabic philosophy of the Middle Ages.

He died in the upper Duero in Peñafiel after 1305.

== Works ==
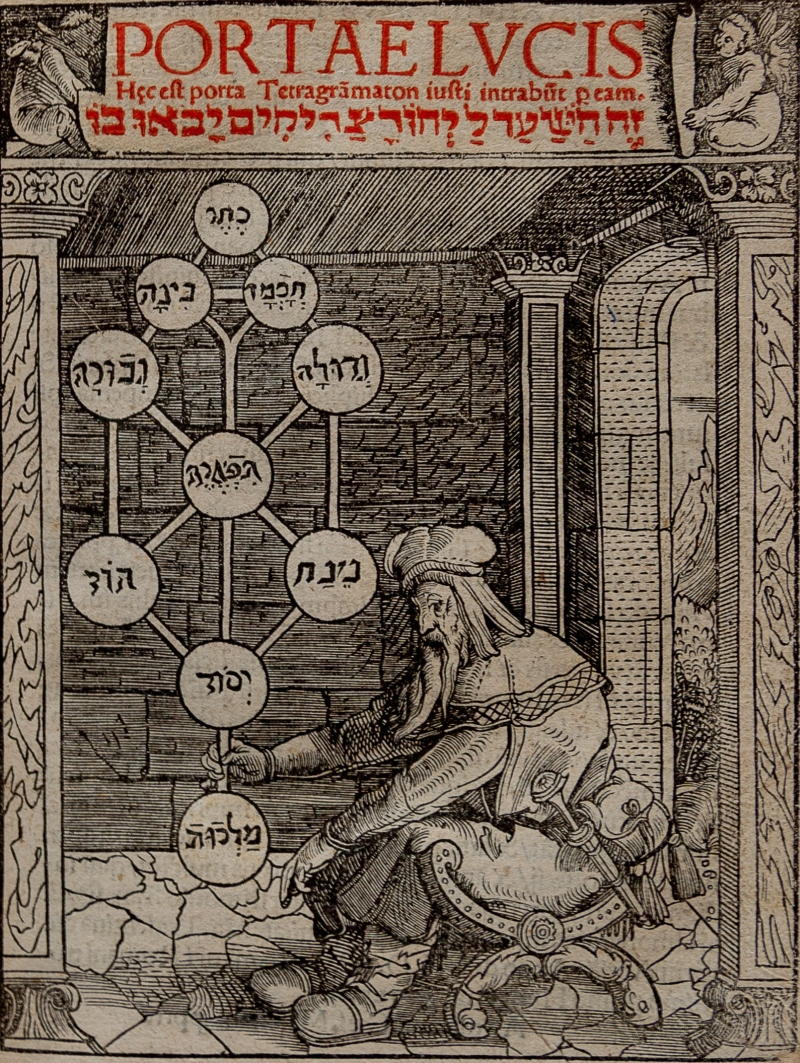
Portae Lucis, Latin from Hebrew translation by Paolo Riccio of Gikatilla's work Shaarei Ora - Gates of Light (Augsburg, Johann Miller) 1516; woodcut Sefirot-diagram and woodcut title illustration by Leonhard Beck depicting Jewish scholar seated in interior, holding orbs with Hebrew lettering with text printed in red ink above

=== Ginnat Egoz ===
Gikatilla was a prolific writer; he wrote his first work (Ginnat Egoz, גנת אגוז) when only twenty-six. It is a kabbalistic treatise in three parts (Hanau, 1615).

- The title, taken from the Song of Solomon. vi.11, means "garden of nuts". Kabalisitically, ginnat "garden" consists of the initials of gematria, notarikon, and temurah, the three main elements of Kabbalah, while egoz "nut" is the emblem of mysticism.
- The first part, in five chapters, treats of the various names of God occurring in the Hebrew Bible. According to Gikatilla, The Tetragrammaton is the only name which represents the substance of God; the other names are merely predicates of the divine attributes. The Tetragrammaton stands for God as He is, while Elohim denotes God as the creative power. The name Tzevaot "armies", he says, applies to all the beings of the three natures, earthly, heavenly (or spheres), and spirits (or forms). The interpretation of tzevaot as "armies of letters" leads him over to the second part.
- The second part treats the letters of the alphabet. He declares that the number ten emanated from the Tetragrammaton, the primitive cause, and is the source of all being; he attempts to prove his statement by different combinations based on religion, philosophy, physics, and mysticism. He shows that the Talmudic view that space is filled with spirits agrees with the belief of the philosophers that there is no vacuum. He also treats here of the revolutions of the sun and moon, giving the relative sizes of the planets.
- The third part is a treatise, in four chapters, on the vowels. The three primitive vowels (holem, shuruq, and hiriq) represent the upper, middle, and lower worlds; the three compound ones, tsere, segol, and shewa, represent the composition or the construction of the worlds; the "pataḥ" and "ḳameẓ" represent their movements.

Gikatilla at times criticizes the Sefer Yeṣirah and the Pirḳe Hekalot. The seven heavens (Ḥag. 12a) are identified by him with the classical planets. He holds Maimonides in great esteem even when he opposes him, and quotes him very often. Other authorities quoted by him are Ibn Gabirol, Samuel ibn Naghrela, and Abraham ibn Ezra. Isaac ben Samuel of Acre in his Me'irat 'Enayyim severely criticizes Gikatilla for too free usage of the Tetragrammaton.

=== Sha'are Orah ===
Sha'are Orah, or Sefer ha-Orah, (שערי אורה) is Gikatilla's most influential work. Isaac Luria (1534–1572) called it "a key to understanding the mystical studies" and from Vilna Gaon (1720–1797) to Zundel Salant (1786–1866) recommended that their students study it. Among those who quoted it were Moses ben Jacob Cordovero, Joseph Caro, Hayyim ben Joseph Vital, Isaiah Horowitz, Yehudah Aryeh Leib Alter, Shem Tov ibn Shem Tov, Moses al-Ashkar and Judah Hayyat. Long extracts from it are inserted by Reuben ben Hoshke in the Yalqut Reubeni. It was translated into Latin by Paolo Riccio and used by Johann Reuchlin as a defense against his adversaries.

==== Contents and Style ====
Sha'are Orah (Mantua, 1561) deals with the names of God.

- According to the commentary of Mattithiah ben Solomon Delacrut, it discusses 300 names, organized into ten chapters, one for each sefira. Each sefira has one primary name but may have many others. Some names are associated with more than one sefira.
- The purpose of the book is "so that you can understand and experience the 'fountain of living waters' (Jer. 2,13) that flows from all his names, and when you attain this 'then you will prosper and have good success' (Joshua 1,8)".

Sefirot and Holy Names
Sefira	Holy Name
כתר, Keter, "Crown"	אהי"ה, Eheye, ""I AM""
חכמה, Chokmah, "Wisdom"	יה, Yah, "Existant"
בינה, Binah, "Understanding"	יהו"ה, Havayah, "LAWMAKER"
חסד, Chesed, "Kindness"	אל, El, "God"
גבורה, Gevurah, "Severity"	אלהים, Elohim, "Lawmaker"
תפארת, Tiferet, "Beauty"	יהו"ה, Havayah, "LORD"
נצח, Netzach, "Sempiternity/Victory"	יהו"ה צבאות, Havayah Tsevaot, "LORD of hosts"
הוד, Hod, "Splendor"	אלהים צבאות, Elohim Tsevaot, "Definiter of hosts"
יסוד, Yesod, "Foundation"	אל חי, El Chai, "God-living"
מלכות, Malkuth, "Kingship"	אדני, Adonai, "our Lord"

Gikatilla takes an attitude somewhat hostile to philosophy. He quotes only the Sefer Yetzirah and the Pirḳe Hekalot.

=== Other works ===
- Sha'are Ṣedeḳ or Sha'ar ha-Shamayim, another treatise by Gikatilla on the ten sefirot (Riva di Trento, 1561).
- Sefer ha-Niqqud, a mystical explanation of the niqqudim, included with the Arṣeh Lebanon (Venice, 1601);
- Sod ha-Ḥashmal, a kabbalistic commentary on the vision of Ezekiel, also printed with the Arze Lebanon;
- Ẓofnat Pa'aneaḥ, commentary on the Haggadah (ib. 1600 [?]);
- Sodot ha-Miṣwot, a kabbalistic explanation of the 613 commandments;
- Iggeret, kabbalistic essays (Feṙrara, 1556);
- Teshubot, responsa;
- Sha'ar Meshalim, a kabbalistic essay in 138 paragraphs;
- Oṣar ha-Kavod, according to Jellinek, the same as the Sodot ha-Miẓwot, a commentary on Song of Songs.
- Hassagot (unpublished) consists of strictures on The Guide for the Perplexed, Gikatilla used al-Ḥarizi's translation, in which he corrects many mistakes and sometimes differs from Maimonides. It seems that he wrote the Hassagot at the beginning of his literary career when he was more of a philosopher and less of a mystic.
- Sod HaNahash, kabbalistic revelations of the divine serpent
- Jellinek thinks that Gikatilla composed a kabbalistic treatise entitled Hekalot of the same character as the Pirqe Hekalot.

== Jewish Encyclopedia bibliography ==
- Adolf Jellinek, Beiträge zur Geschichte der Kabbala, ii.61 et seq.;
- Leopold Zunz, Additamenta (to the catalogue of the Hebrew manuscripts in Leipzig), pp. 320–321;
- Cassel, in Ersch and Gruber, Encyc. section ii, part 31, pp. 76–80;
- S. Sachs, in Ha-Yonah, p. 80;
- M. H. Landauer, in Litteraturblatt des Orients, vi.227-228;
- Eliakim Carmoly, Itinéraires, p. 276;
- Heinrich Grätz, Geschichte der Juden von den ältesten Zeiten bis auf die Gegenwart 3d ed., pp. 194, 198;
- Moritz Steinschneider, Cat. Bodl. cols. 1461–1470.
