= Solomon ben Judah =

Solomon ben Judah may refer to:

- Solomon ben Judah of Lunel (born 1411), Provençal philosopher
- Solomon ibn Gabirol (circa 1021 – circa 1058), Andalucian Hebrew poet and Jewish philosopher
- Solomon ben Judah ha-Bavli (10th century), German Jewish liturgist
- Shlomo Kluger or Solomon ben Judah Aaron Kluger (1783 – 1869), chief dayan and preacher of Brody, Galicia

== See also ==
- Judah ben Solomon (disambiguation)
