= Sha'arei Orah =

Sha'arei Orah translates to "Gates of Light" in Hebrew and may refer to:

- Sha'arei Orah, a book on Jewish mysticism by Rabbi Joseph ben Abraham Gikatilla (1248–after 1305)
- Sha'arei Orah, a book on Chabad Hasidic philosophy by Rabbi Dovber Schneuri (1773-1827)
- Sha'arei Orah, a book on Jewish ethics by Rabbi Avigdor Miller (1908-2001)
