= Pekudei =

23rd weekly Torah portion or parashah

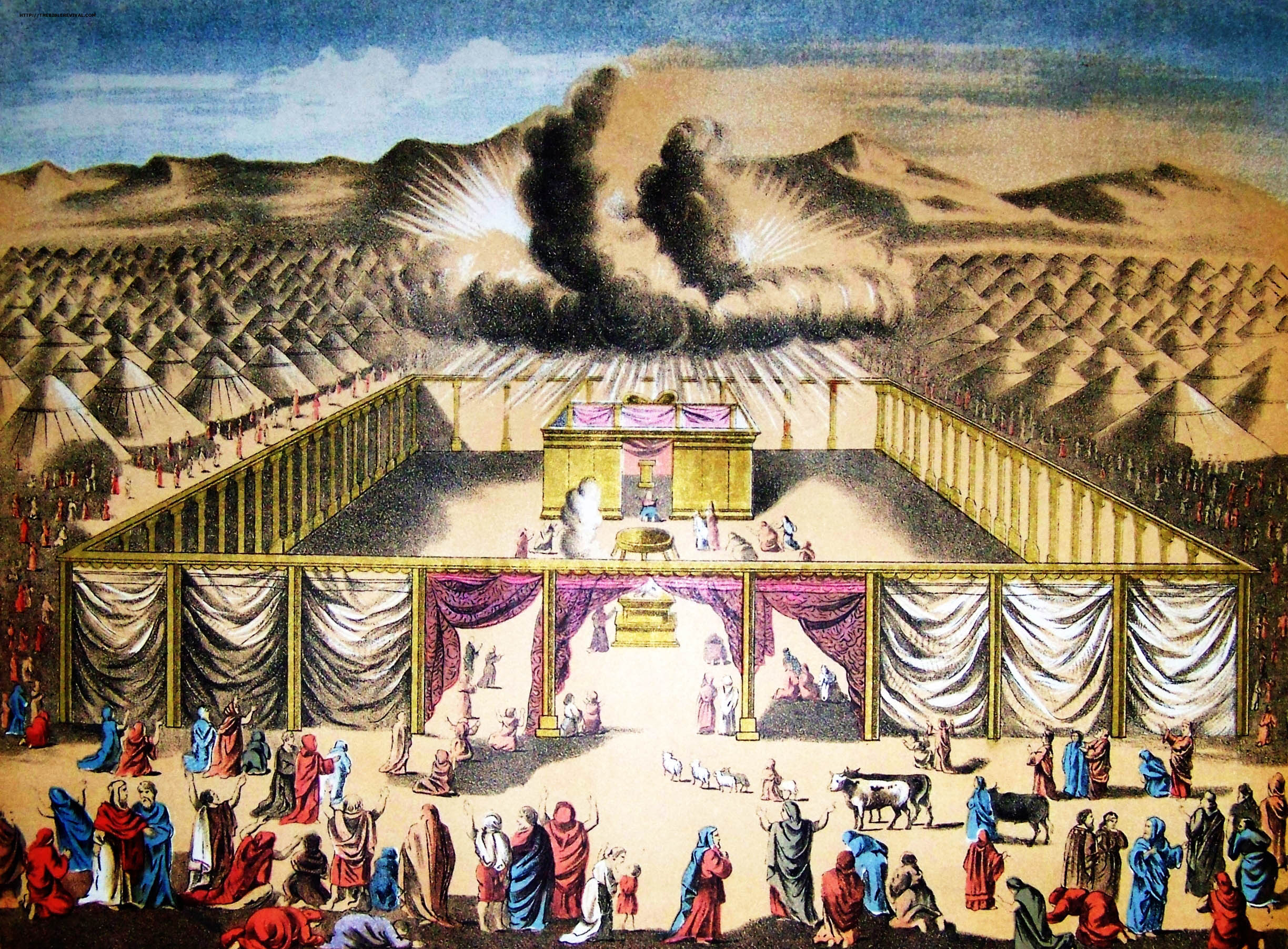
The Tabernacle in the Wilderness (illustration from the 1890 Holman Bible)

Pekudei, Pekude, Pekudey, P'kude, or P'qude (פְקוּדֵי—Hebrew for "amounts of," the second word, and the first distinctive word, in the parashah) is the 23rd weekly Torah portion (פָּרָשָׁה, parashah) in the annual Jewish cycle of Torah reading. It is the 11th and last in the Book of Exodus. The parashah tells of the setting up of the Tabernacle (מִשְׁכַּן, Mishkan).

It constitutes Exodus 38:21–40:38. The parashah is made up of 4,432 Hebrew letters, 1,182 Hebrew words, 92 verses, and 159 lines in a Torah scroll (סֵפֶר תּוֹרָה, Sefer Torah). Jews read it the 22nd or 23rd Sabbath after Simchat Torah, in March. The lunisolar Hebrew calendar contains up to 55 weeks, the exact number varying between 50 in common years and 54 or 55 in leap years. In leap years (for example, 2027, 2030, 2033, 2038, 2041, 2043, 2046, and 2049), Parashat Pekudei is read separately. In common years (for example, 2026, 2028, 2029, 2031, 2032, 2034, 2036, 2039, 2040, 2042, 2044, 2047, 2048, and 2050), Parashat Pekudei is generally combined with the previous parashah, Vayakhel, to help achieve the needed number of weekly readings (although in some non-leap years, such as 2025, 2037, and 2045, they are not combined).

== Readings ==
In traditional Sabbath Torah reading, the parashah is divided into seven readings, or עליות, aliyot.

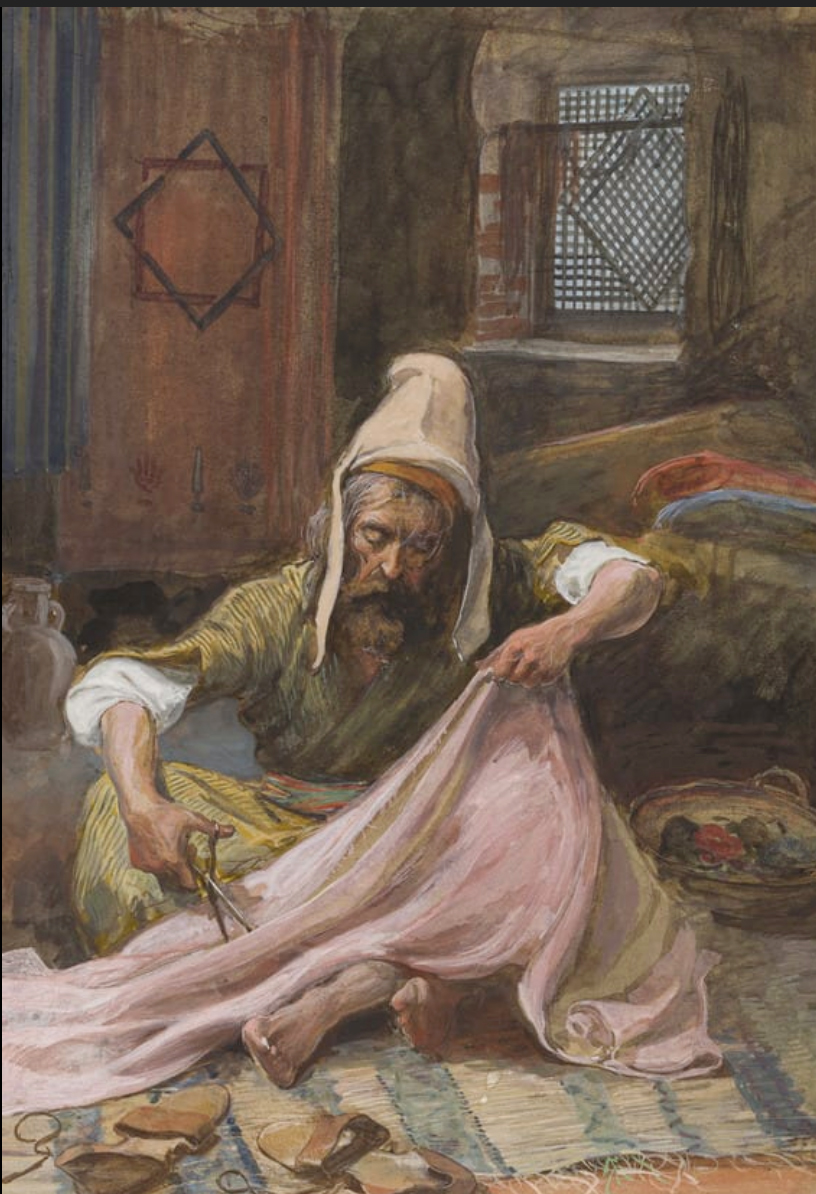
The Tailor (gouache on board, c. 1896-1902 by James Tissot)

=== First reading—Exodus 38:21–39:1 ===
In the first reading, at the direction of Moses, Aaron's son Ithamar oversaw the accounts of the Tabernacle, and the text sets forth the amounts of gold, silver, and copper that Bezalel, Oholiab, and their coworkers used. The silver came from the half-shekel a head for each man 20 years old or older who was counted in the census.

=== Second reading—Exodus 39:2–21 ===
In the second reading, Bezalel, Oholiab, and their coworkers made the priests' vestments, the ephod, and the breastpiece—just as God had commanded Moses.

=== Third reading—Exodus 39:22–32 ===
In the third reading, Bezalel, Oholiab, and their coworkers made the robe, the tunics of fine linen, and the frontlet inscribed "Holy to the Lord"—just as God had commanded Moses.

=== Fourth reading—Exodus 39:33–43 ===
In the fourth reading, they brought the Tabernacle and all its furnishings to Moses, and he blessed them.

=== Fifth reading—Exodus 40:1–16 ===
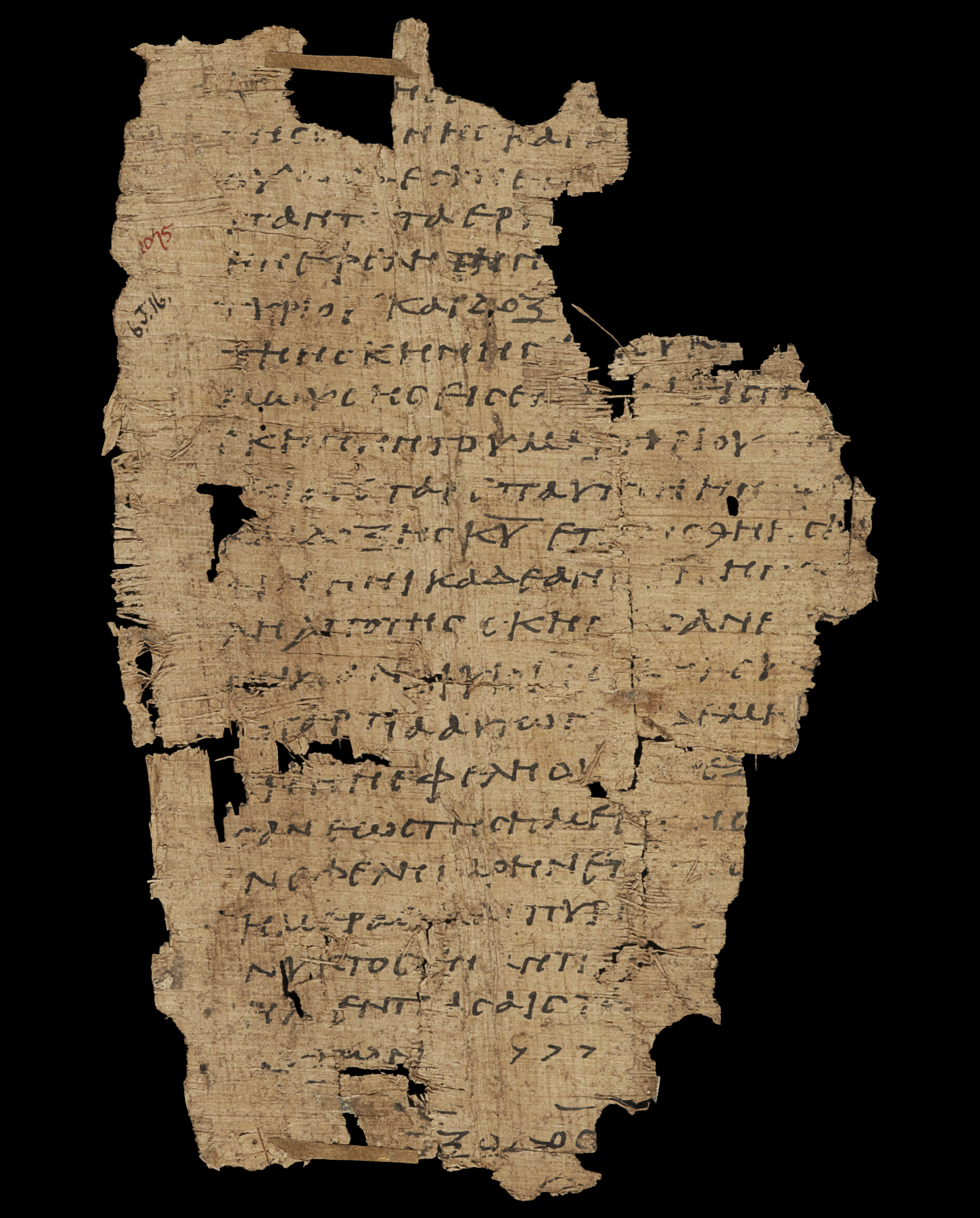
Papyrus Oxyrhynchus 1075, a 3rd or 4th century AD manuscript showing part of Exodus 40 in Greek

In the fifth reading, God told Moses to set up the Tabernacle, and Moses did just as God had commanded him.

=== Sixth reading—Exodus 40:17–27 ===
In the sixth reading, it was the first day of the second year of the Exodus that Moses erected the Tabernacle and its furnishings—just as God had commanded Moses.

=== Seventh reading—Exodus 40:28–38 ===
In the seventh reading, Moses finished the work, and the cloud covered the Tent of Meeting, and God's Presence filled the Tabernacle. When the cloud lifted from the Tabernacle, the Israelites would set out, and when the cloud did not lift, they would not set out. And God's cloud rested over the Tabernacle by day, and fire would appear in it by night, throughout the Israelites' journeys.

=== Readings according to the triennial cycle ===
Jews who read the Torah according to the triennial cycle of Torah reading may read the parashah according to a different schedule.

== In inner-Biblical interpretation ==
The parashah has parallels or is discussed in these Biblical sources:

=== Exodus chapters 25–39 ===
This is the pattern of instruction and construction of the Tabernacle and its furnishings:

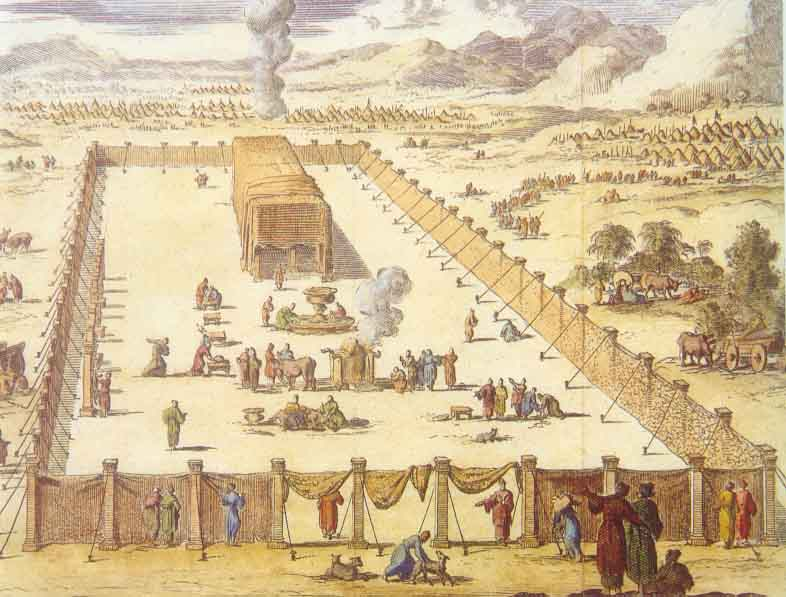
The Tabernacle

Item	Instruction		Construction	
Item	Order	Verses	Order	Verses
The Sabbath	16	Exodus 31:12–17	1	Exodus 35:1–3
Contributions	1	Exodus 25:1–9	2	Exodus 35:4–29
Craftspeople	15	Exodus 31:1–11	3	Exodus 35:30–36:7
Tabernacle	5	Exodus 26:1–37	4	Exodus 36:8–38
Ark	2	Exodus 25:10–22	5	Exodus 37:1–9
Table	3	Exodus 25:23–30	6	Exodus 37:10–16
Menorah	4	Exodus 25:31–40	7	Exodus 37:17–24
Altar of Incense	11	Exodus 30:1–10	8	Exodus 37:25–28
Anointing Oil	13	Exodus 30:22–33	9	Exodus 37:29
Incense	14	Exodus 30:34–38	10	Exodus 37:29
Altar of Sacrifice	6	Exodus 27:1–8	11	Exodus 38:1–7
Laver	12	Exodus 30:17–21	12	Exodus 38:8
Tabernacle Court	7	Exodus 27:9–19	13	Exodus 38:9–20
Priestly Garments	9	Exodus 28:1–43	14	Exodus 39:1–31
Ordination Ritual	10	Exodus 29:1–46	15	Leviticus 8:1–9:24
Lamp	8	Exodus 27:20–21	16	Numbers 8:1–4

=== Exodus chapter 39 ===
2 Chronicles 1:5–6 reports that the bronze altar that Bezalel built, which they brought to Moses in Exodus 39:39, still stood before the Tabernacle in Solomon's time, and Solomon sacrificed a thousand burnt offerings on it.

=== Exodus chapters 39–40 ===
The Priestly story of the Tabernacle in Exodus 39–40 echoes the Priestly story of creation in Genesis 1:1–2:3. As the creation story unfolds in seven days, the instructions about the Tabernacle unfold in seven speeches. In both creation and Tabernacle accounts, the text notes the completion of the task. In both creation and Tabernacle, the work done is seen to be good. In both creation and Tabernacle, when the work is finished, God takes an action in acknowledgement. In both creation and Tabernacle, when the work is finished, a blessing is invoked. And in both creation and Tabernacle, God declares something "holy."

Jeffrey Tigay noted that the lampstand held seven candles, Aaron wore seven sacral vestments, the account of the building of the Tabernacle alludes to the creation account, and the Tabernacle was completed on New Year's Day. And Carol Meyers noted that Exodus 25:1–9 and 35:4–29 list seven kinds of substances—metals, yarn, skins, wood, oil, spices, and gemstones—signifying the totality of supplies. Martin Buber and others noted that the language used to describe the building of the Tabernacle parallels that used in the story of creation:

Creation and the Tabernacle
Verses in Genesis	Texts	Words in Common	Verses in Exodus	Texts
1:7, 16, 25	^{7}And God made (וַיַּעַשׂ) the firmament, and divided the waters which were under the firmament from the waters which were above the firmament; and it was so... . ^{16}And God made (וַיַּעַשׂ) the two great lights: the greater light to rule the day, and the lesser light to rule the night; and the stars... ^{25}And God made (וַיַּעַשׂ) the beast of the earth after its kind, and the cattle after their kind, and everything that creeps upon the ground after its kind; and God saw that it was good.	made make וַיַּעַשׂ וְעָשׂוּ וְעָשִׂיתָ	25:8, 10, 23, 31	^{8}And let them make (וְעָשׂוּ) Me a sanctuary, that I may dwell among them... ^{10}And they shall make (וְעָשׂוּ) an ark of acacia-wood: two cubits and a half shall be the length thereof, and a cubit and a half the breadth thereof, and a cubit and a half the height thereof... ^{23}And you shall make (וְעָשִׂיתָ) a table of acacia-wood: two cubits shall be the length thereof, and a cubit the breadth thereof, and a cubit and a half the height thereof... ^{31}And you shall make (וְעָשִׂיתָ) a candlestick of pure gold: of beaten work shall the candlestick be made, even its base, and its shaft; its cups, its knops, and its flowers, shall be of one piece with it.
2:1–2	^{1}And the heaven and the earth were finished (וַיְכֻלּוּ), and all the host of them. ^{2}And on the seventh day God finished (וַיְכַל) His work that He had made; and He rested on the seventh day from all His work that He had made.	finished וַיְכֻלּוּ וַיְכַל וַתֵּכֶל	39:32; 40:33	^{32}Thus was finished (וַתֵּכֶל) all the work of the Tabernacle of the tent of meeting; and the children of Israel did according to all that the Lord commanded Moses, so did they... ^{33}And he reared up the court round about the tabernacle and the altar, and set up the screen of the gate of the court. So Moses finished (וַיְכַל) the work.
1:31	^{31}And God saw (וַיַּרְא) everything that He had made, and, behold (וְהִנֵּה), it was very good. And there was evening and there was morning, the sixth day.	saw ... behold וַיַּרְא ... וְהִנֵּה	39:43	^{43}And Moses saw (וַיַּרְא) all the work, and, behold (וְהִנֵּה), they had done it; as the Lord had commanded, even so had they done it. And Moses blessed them.
2:3	^{3}And God blessed (וַיְבָרֶךְ) the seventh day, and hallowed it; because in it He rested from all His work that God in creating had made.	blessed וַיְבָרֶךְ	39:43	^{43}And Moses saw all the work, and, behold, they had done it; as the Lord had commanded, even so had they done it. And Moses blessed (וַיְבָרֶךְ) them.

== In early nonrabbinic interpretation ==
The parashah has parallels or is discussed in these early nonrabbinic sources:

=== Exodus chapter 38 ===
Josephus taught that when the Israelites brought together the materials with great diligence, Moses set architects over the works by the command of God. And these were the very same people that the people themselves would have chosen, had the election been allowed to them: Bezalel, the son of Uri, of the tribe of Judah, the grandson of Miriam, the sister of Moses, and Oholiab, file son of Ahisamach, of the tribe of Dan.

== In classical rabbinic interpretation ==
The parashah is discussed in these rabbinic sources from the era of the Mishnah and the Talmud:

=== Exodus chapter 38 ===
The Midrash Tanḥuma taught that God considers studying the sanctuary's structure as equivalent to rebuilding it.

Reading Exodus 38:21, "These are the accounts of the Tabernacle," Rabbi Tanḥuma cited Proverbs 28:20, "A faithful man shall abound with blessings; but he that makes haste to be rich shall not be unpunished." Rabbi Tanḥuma taught that God always brings blessings through a person of integrity, but one who is not faithful and "makes haste to be rich shall not be unpunished." The midrash taught that "a faithful man" refers to Moses, who was God's confidant, as Numbers 12:7 reports, "My servant Moses... is trusted in all My house." Thus, Solomon said in Proverbs 28:20, "A faithful man shall abound with blessings," because God blessed everything that Moses oversaw, on account of his trustworthiness. Another explanation of "A faithful man" is that it refers to Moses, who was made treasurer over the work of the Tabernacle. But the Rabbis taught, "One must not appoint fewer than two people to control the finances of a city or community," and the midrash asked whether Moses was not solely in charge. The midrash answered that although Moses was the sole treasurer, he called others to audit the accounts. The midrash noted that Exodus 38:21 says, "These are the accounts of the Tabernacle," and does not say, "which Moses rendered," but "which were rendered according to the commandment of Moses." Thus the accounts were rendered through Moses but, as Exodus 38:21 reports, "by the hand of Ithamar" (implying that Moses showed all the accounts to Ithamar).

Reading Exodus 38:21, "as they were rendered according to the commandment of Moses," a midrash taught that the Israelites did everything that they did by the command of Moses. And reading the continuation of Exodus 38:21, "through the service of the Levites, by the hand of Ithamar, the son of Aaron the priest," the midrash taught that everything that Moses made was done through others. Even though everything was done with witnesses, as soon as the construction of the Tabernacle was completed, Moses wasted no time to promise the people the complete details of all the expenditures involved. Moses then began to expound in Exodus 38:21, "These are the accounts of the Tabernacle," saying how much he had expended on the Tabernacle. While engaged in this calculation, Moses completely forgot about 1,775 shekalim of silver that he had used for hooks for the pillars, and he became uneasy thinking to himself that the Israelites would find grounds to say that Moses took them for himself. So God opened the eyes of Moses to realize that the silver had been converted into hooks for the pillars. When the Israelites saw that the account now completely tallied, they were completely satisfied with the integrity of the work on the Tabernacle. And thus Exodus 38:21 says, "These are the accounts of the Tabernacle," to report that the accounts balanced. The midrash asked why Moses had to account to the Israelites, seeing as God trusted Moses so implicitly that God said in Numbers 12:7, "My servant Moses is not so; he is trusted in all My house." The midrash explained that Moses overheard certain Israelites scoffing behind his back, for Exodus 33:8 says, "And they (the Israelites) looked after Moses." The midrash asked what the people would say about Moses. Rabbi Joḥanan taught that the people blessed his mother, for she never saw him, as he was always speaking with God and always wholly given over to his service. But Rabbi Hama said that they used to remark how fat and prosperous Moses looked. When Moses heard this, he vowed to give an account of everything. And this is why Exodus 38:21 says, "These are the accounts of the Tabernacle."

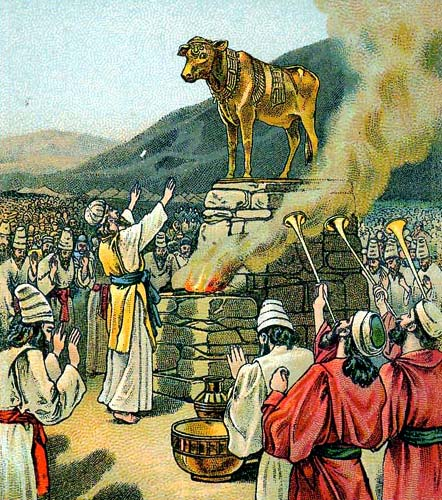
Worshiping the Golden Calf (illustration from a Bible card published 1901 by the Providence Lithograph Company)

Rabbi Simeon son of Rabbi Ishmael interpreted the term "the Tabernacle of the testimony" in Exodus 38:21 to mean that the Tabernacle was God's testimony to the whole world that God had forgiven Israel for having made the Golden Calf. Rabbi Isaac explained with a parable. A king took a wife whom he dearly loved. He became angry with her and left her, and her neighbors taunted her, saying that he would not return. Then the king sent her a message asking her to prepare the king's palace and make the beds therein, for he was coming back to her on such-and-such a day. On that day, the king returned to her and became reconciled to her, entering her chamber and eating and drinking with her. Her neighbors at first did not believe it, but when they smelled the fragrant spices, they knew that the king had returned. Similarly, God loved Israel, bringing the Israelites to Mount Sinai, and giving them the Torah, but after only 40 days, they sinned with the Golden Calf. The heathen nations then said that God would not be reconciled with the Israelites. But when Moses pleaded for mercy on their behalf, God forgave them, as Numbers 14:20 reports, "And the Lord said: ‘I have pardoned according to your word.'" Moses then told God that even though he personally was quite satisfied that God had forgiven Israel, he asked that God might announce that fact to the nations. God replied that God would cause God's Shechinah to dwell in their midst, and thus Exodus 25:8 says, "And let them make Me a sanctuary, that I may dwell among them." And by that sign, God intended that all nations might know that God had forgiven the Israelites. And thus Exodus 38:21 calls it "the Tabernacle of the testimony," because the Tabernacle was a testimony that God had pardoned the Israelites' sins.

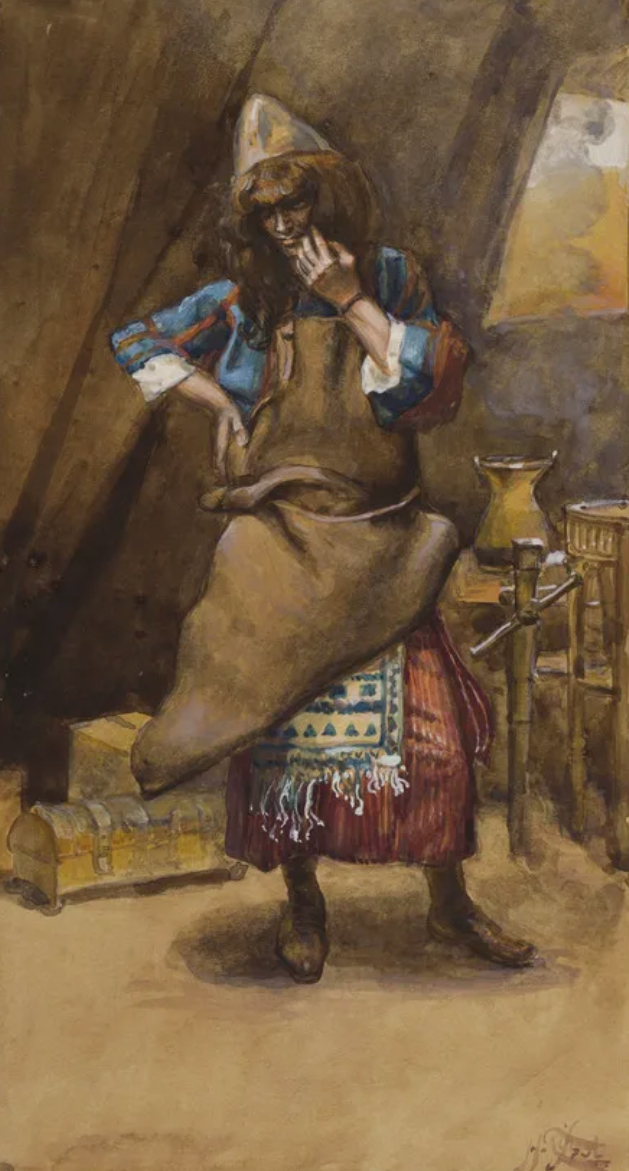
The Goldsmith (gouache on board, c. 1896–1902 by James Tissot)

The Jerusalem Talmud reports that Rabbi Tanḥuma taught in the name of Rav Huna that even the things that Bezalel did not hear from Moses he conceived of on his own exactly as they were told to Moses from Sinai. Rabbi Tanḥuma said in the name of Rav Huna that one can deduce this from the words of Exodus 38:22, "And Bezalel the son of Uri, the son of Ḥur, of the tribe of Judah, made all that the Lord commanded Moses." For Exodus 38:22 does not say, "that Moses commanded him," but, "that the Lord commanded Moses." And the Agadat Shir ha-Shirim taught that Bezalel and Oholiab went up Mount Sinai, where the heavenly Sanctuary was shown to them.

A midrash explained that Israel sinned with fire in making the Golden Calf, as Exodus 32:24 says, "And I cast it into the fire, and there came out this calf." And then Bezalel came and healed the wound (and the construction of the Tabernacle made atonement for the sins of the people in making the Golden Calf). The midrash likened it to the words of Isaiah 54:16, "Behold, I have created the smith who blows the fire of coals." The midrash taught that Bezalel was the smith whom God had created to address the fire. And the midrash likened it to the case of a doctor's disciple who applied a plaster to a wound and healed it. When people began to praise him, his teacher, the doctor, said that they should praise the doctor, for he taught the disciple. Similarly, when everybody said that Bezalel had constructed the Tabernacle through his knowledge and understanding, God said that it was God who created him and taught him, as Isaiah 54:16 says, "Behold, I have created the smith." Thus Moses said in Exodus 35:30, "see, the Lord has called by name Bezalel."

Exodus 35:30 identifies Bezalel's grandfather as Ḥur, whom either Rav or Samuel deduced was the son of Miriam and Caleb. A midrash explained that Exodus 35:30 mentions Ḥur, because when the Israelites were about to serve the Golden Calf, Ḥur risked his life on God's behalf to prevent them from doing so, and they killed him. Whereupon God assured Ḥur that God would repay him for his sacrifice. The midrash likened it to the case of a king whose legions rebelled against him, and his field marshal fought against the rebels, questioning how they could dare rebel against the king. In the end, the rebels killed the field marshal. The king reasoned that if the field marshal had given the king money, the king would have had to repay him. So even more so the king had an obligation to repay the field marshal when he gave his life on the king's behalf. The king rewarded the field marshal by ordaining that all his male offspring would become generals and officers. Similarly, when Israel made the Golden Calf, Ḥur gave his life for the glory of God. Thus, God assured Ḥur that God would give all Ḥur's descendants a great name in the world. And thus Exodus 35:30 says, "see, the Lord has called by name Bezalel, the son of Uri, the son of Ḥur."

Rabbi Joḥanan taught that God proclaims three things for God's Self: famine, plenty, and a good leader. 2 Kings 8:1 shows that God proclaims famine, when it says: "The Lord has called for a famine." Ezekiel 36:29 shows that God proclaims plenty, when it says: "I will call for the corn and will increase it." And Exodus 31:1–2 shows that God proclaims a good leader, when it says: "And the Lord spoke to Moses, saying, ‘See I have called by name Bezalel, the son of Uri.'" Rabbi Isaac taught that we cannot appoint a leader over a community without first consulting the people, as Exodus 35:30 says: "And Moses said unto the children of Israel: ‘See, the Lord has called by name Bezalel, the son of Uri.'" Rabbi Isaac taught that God asked Moses whether Moses considered Bezalel suitable. Moses replied that if God thought Bezalel suitable, surely Moses must also. God told Moses that, all the same, Moses should go and consult the people. Moses then asked the Israelites whether they considered Bezalel suitable. They replied that if God and Moses considered Bezalel suitable, then surely they had to, as well. Rabbi Samuel bar Naḥmani said in the name of Rabbi Joḥanan that Bezalel (בְּצַלְאֵל, whose name can be read בְּצֵל אֶל, betzel El, "in the shadow of God") was so called because of his wisdom. When God told Moses (in Exodus 31:7) to tell Bezalel to make a tabernacle, an ark, and vessels, Moses reversed the order and told Bezalel to make an ark, vessels, and a tabernacle. Bezalel replied to Moses that as a rule, one first builds a house and then brings vessels into it, but Moses directed to make an ark, vessels, and a tabernacle. Bezalel asked where he would put the vessels. And Bezalel asked whether God had told Moses to make a tabernacle, an ark, and vessels. Moses replied that perhaps Bezalel had been in the shadow of God (בְּצֵל אֶל, betzel El) and had thus come to know this. Rav Judah taught in the name of Rav that Exodus 35:31 indicated that God endowed Bezalel with the same attribute that God used in creating the universe. Rav Judah said in the name of Rav that Bezalel knew how to combine the letters by which God created the heavens and earth. For Exodus 35:31 says (about Bezalel), "And He has filled him with the spirit of God, in wisdom and in understanding, and in knowledge," and Proverbs 3:19 says (about creation), "The Lord by wisdom founded the earth; by understanding He established the heavens," and Proverbs 3:20 says, "By His knowledge the depths were broken up."

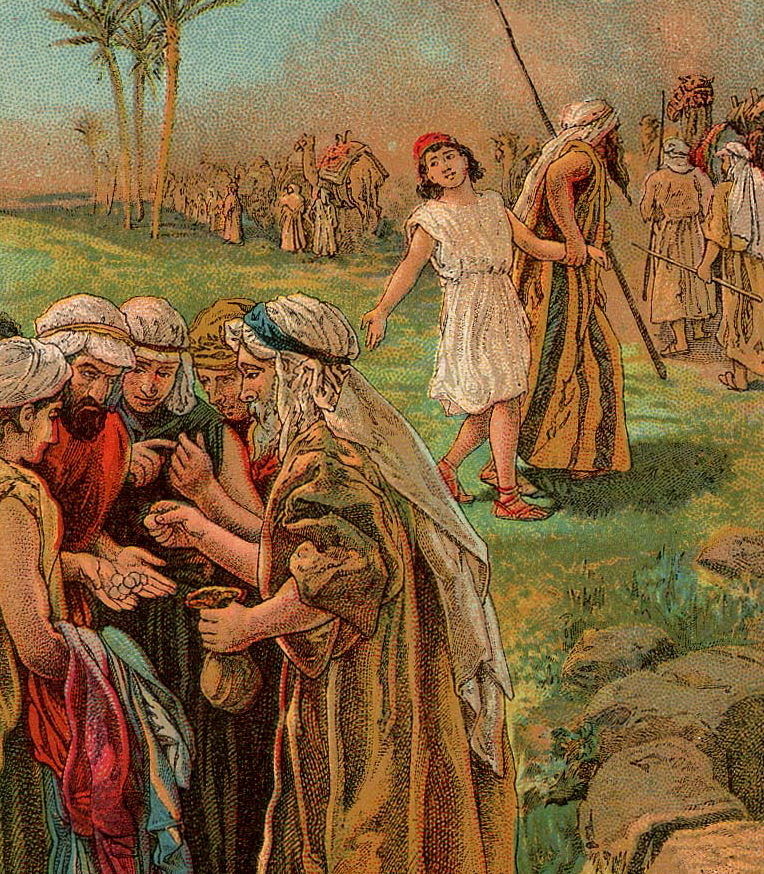
Joseph Sold by His Brothers (illustration from a Bible card published 1907 by the Providence Lithograph Company)

Doing the math implied by Exodus 36:4, Exodus 38:22, Joshua 14:7, and 1 Chronicles 2:19–20, the Gemara deduced that in earlier generations, a boy of eight could father children. Exodus 38:22 reports that "Bezalel, son of Uri, son of Ḥur, of the tribe of Judah, made all that the Lord had commanded Moses," when they built the Tabernacle. And 1 Chronicles 2:19–20 reports that Caleb fathered the Ḥur who fathered Uri who fathered Bezalel. Exodus 36:4 reports that "wise men... wrought all the work of the Sanctuary," so Bezalel must have been at least 13 years old to have been a man when he worked on the Tabernacle. A baraita taught that Moses made the Tabernacle in the first year after the Exodus, and in the second, he erected it and sent out the spies, so the Gemara deduced that Bezalel must have been at least 14 years old when Moses sent out the spies, the year after Bezalel worked on the Tabernacle. And Joshua 14:7 reports that Caleb said that he was 40 years old when Moses sent him to spy out the land. Thus, the Gemara deduced that Caleb was only 26 years older than his great-grandson Bezalel. Deducting two years for the three pregnancies needed to create the three intervening generations, the Gemara concluded that each of Caleb, Ḥur, and Uri must have conceived his son at the age of eight.

Rabbi Judah ben Simon taught that God required each of the Israelites to give a half-shekel (as reported in Exodus 38:26) because (as reported in Genesis 37:28) their ancestors had sold Joseph to the Ishmaelites for 20 shekels.

The Jerusalem Talmud reported that the Roman official Antigonos, reading the account of Exodus 38:26 of how much silver the Israelites used in the Tabernacle, told Rabban Joḥanan ben Zakkai that Moses was either a thief or bad at calculating. But Joḥanan ben Zakkai laid out the math and insisted that Moses was a trustworthy treasurer and expert in computations.

=== Exodus chapter 39 ===
A midrash noted that the section recounting the setting up of the Tabernacle in Parashat Pekudei, in which, beginning with Exodus 39:1, nearly every paragraph concludes, "Even as the Lord commanded Moses," is followed by Leviticus 1:1: "And the Lord called to Moses." The midrash compared this to the case of a king who commanded his servant to build him a palace. On everything the servant built, he wrote the name of the king. The servant wrote the name of the king on the walls, the pillars, and the roof beams. After some time, the king entered the palace, and on everything he saw he found his name. The king thought that the servant had done him all this honor, and yet the servant remained outside. So the king had called that the servant might come right in. So, too, when God directed Moses to make God a Tabernacle, Moses wrote on everything he made "Even as the Lord commanded Moses." God thought that Moses had done God all this honor, and yet Moses remained outside. So God call Moses so that he might enter the innermost part of the Tabernacle. Therefore, Leviticus 1:1 reports, "And the Lord called to Moses." Rabbi Samuel bar Naḥman said in the name of Rabbi Nathan that "as the Lord commanded" is written 18 times in the section recounting the setting up of the Tabernacle in Parashat Pekudei, corresponding to the 18 vertebrae of the spinal column. Likewise, the Sages instituted 18 benedictions of the Amidah prayer, corresponding to the 18 mentions of the Divine Name in the reading of the Shema, and also in Psalm 29. Rabbi Ḥiyya bar Abba taught that the 18 times "command" are counted only from Exodus 38:23, "And with him was Oholiab, the son of Ahisamach of the tribe of Dan," until the end of the Book of Exodus.

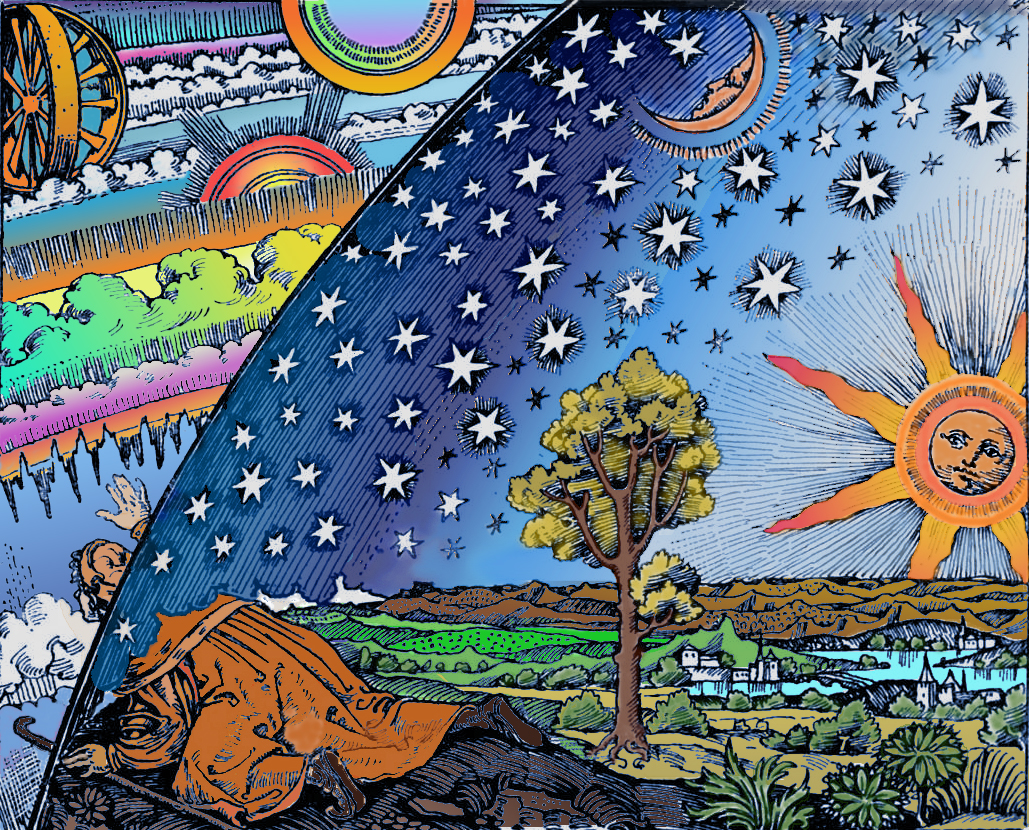
The Firmament (illustration from Camille Flammarion's 1888 L'atmosphère: météorologie populaire)

The Jerusalem Talmud reported that Rabbi Judah ben Pazi noted that a similar word appears in both Genesis 1:6—where רָקִיעַ, rakya, is translated as "firmament"—and Exodus 39:3—where וַיְרַקְּעוּ, vayraku, is translated as "and they flattened." He thus deduced from the usage in Exodus 39:3 that Genesis 1:6 taught that on the second day of creation, God spread the heavens flat like a cloth. Or Rabbi Judah ben Simon deduced from Exodus 39:3 that Genesis 1:6 meant "let a lining be made for the firmament."

The Rabbis taught in a baraita that the robe (מְעִיל, me'il) mentioned in Exodus 28:4 was entirely of turquoise (תְּכֵלֶת, techelet), as Exodus 39:22 says, "And he made the robe of the ephod of woven work, all of turquoise." They made its hems of turquoise, purple, and crimson wool, twisted together and formed into the shape of pomegranates whose mouths were not yet opened (as overripe pomegranates open slightly) and in the shape of the cones of the helmets on children's heads. Seventy-two bells containing 72 clappers were hung on the robe, 36 on each side (front and behind). Rabbi Dosa (or others say, Judah the Prince) said in the name of Rabbi Judah that there were 36 bells in all, 18 on each side.

A baraita taught that the High Priest's wore his miter so that hair was visible between the headplate and the miter described in Exodus 39:30–31.

The Pesikta Rabbati taught that when the Israelites continually complained, God asked them to build the Tabernacle, so that they would be too busy to complain. But when, as Exodus 39:32 reports, all the work of the Tabernacle was finished, God exclaimed, "Woe is Me! It is finished!"

Reading Exodus 39:33, "its hooks, its frames, its bars, its pillars, and its bases," Rabbi Yose the son of Rabbi Bun taught that people could see the Tabernacle's hooks from the inside, and they looked like stars in the firmament.

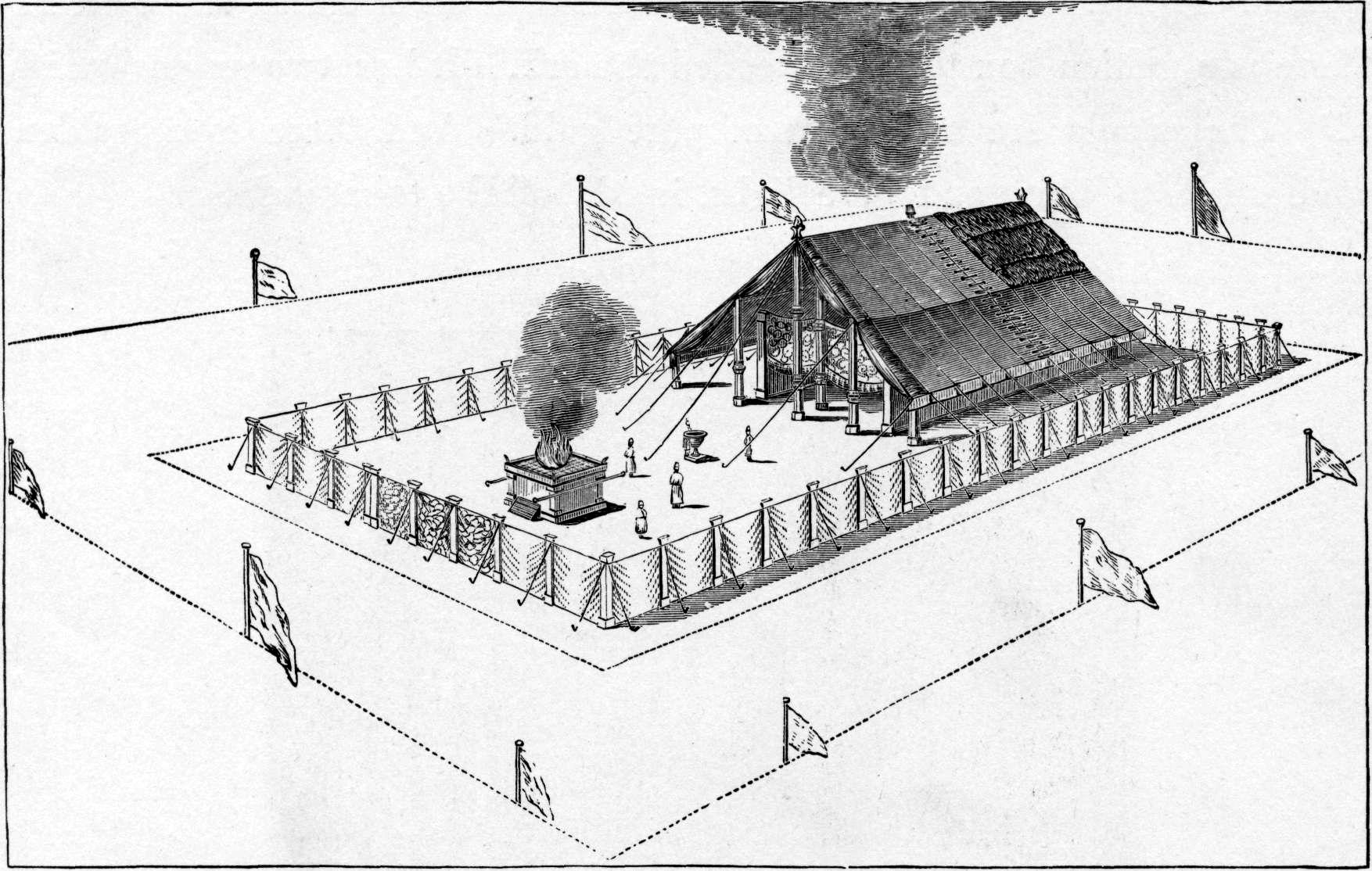
The Tabernacle that the Israelites Built (illustration from the 1897 Bible Pictures and What They Teach Us by Charles Foster)

Reading Exodus 39:33, "and they brought the Tabernacle," a midrash taught that on the day that the Tabernacle was set up, the Israelites rejoiced greatly because God then dwelt in their midst. And the people sang the words of Song of Songs Song 3:11, "Go forth, O you daughters of Zion, and gaze upon King Solomon, even upon the crown wherewith his mother has crowned him in the day of his espousals, and in the day of the gladness of his heart." "O you daughters of Zion" were the children who are distinguished as God's from among the peoples. "And gaze upon King Solomon" meant "gaze upon a King to whom all peace belongs" (reading the name Solomon as a play on the word "His peace")—that is, upon the King of kings, God. "Even upon the crown wherewith his mother has crowned him" referred to the Tabernacle, which was called a crown because just as a crown has beautiful designs, so was the Tabernacle beautifully designed. "In the day of his espousals" referred to Sinai (at the Revelation). "And in the day of the gladness of his heart" referred to Jerusalem (when God caused God's presence to dwell in the Temple in Jerusalem). According to another explanation, "in the day of his espousals" was the day when God was with Israel at the Red Sea, and "in the day of the gladness of his heart" was when God's presence dwelt in the Tent of Meeting. And according to yet another explanation, "in the day of his espousals" was in the Tabernacle, and "in the day of the gladness of his heart" was in the Temple (when they were erected).

In the Tosefta, Rabbi Meir taught that when, as Exodus 39:43 reports, Moses saw all the work of the Tabernacle and the Priestly garments that the Israelites had done, “Moses blessed them” with the blessing of Deuteronomy 1:11, saying, “The Lord, the God of your ancestors, make you a thousand times so many more as you are, and bless you, as God has promised you!”

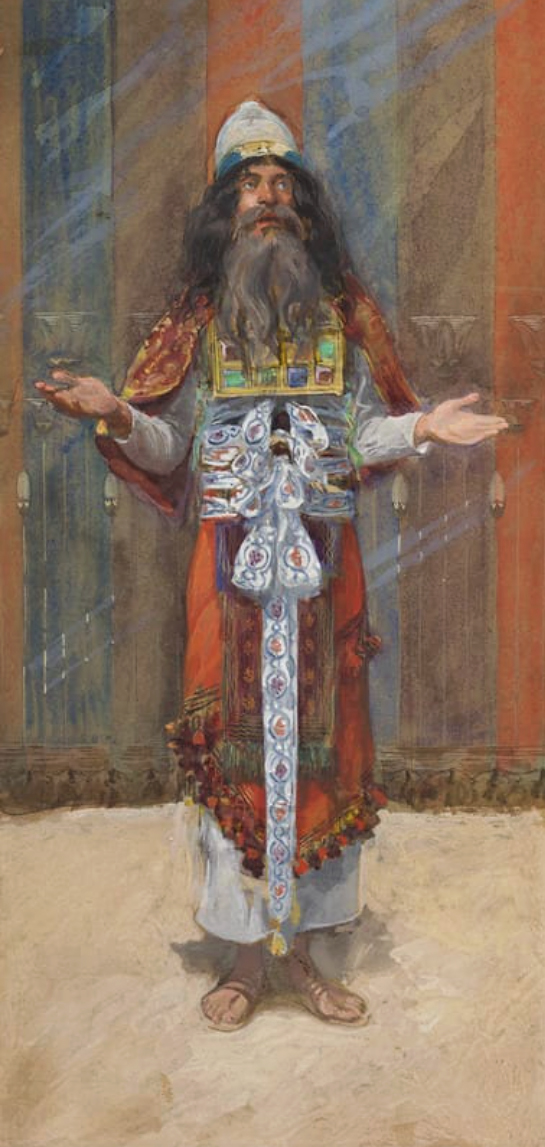
The Costume of the High Priest, gouache on board, c. 1896–1902, by James Jacques Joseph Tissot (French, 1836–1902)

=== Exodus chapter 40 ===
A midrash taught that the priestly garments of which God spoke in Exodus 40:13 were in fact the garments for which Jacob prayed at Bethel in Genesis 28:20. The midrash taught that Jacob did not ask simply for food and garments, but that God would promise to be with him and build up the world from him. And Jacob would know that God was with him and guarded him when God would raise up from him sons who would be priests, eating of the showbread and clothed in the priestly garments. The midrash interpreted the words of Genesis 28:20, "bread to eat," to refer to the showbread, and "garments to put on" to refer to the priestly garments, for Exodus 40:13 says: "And you shall put upon Aaron the holy garments."

A midrash taught that many wise people were there, yet they had to come to Moses, for they could not erect the Tabernacle on their own. Moses excelled them all in skill, as Solomon said in Proverbs 31:29, "Many daughters have done valiantly, but you excel them all." So each of the wise people took a finished piece of work and came to Moses to present him the boards, the bars, and all the parts. As soon as Moses saw the parts, the Holy Spirit settled on him, and he set the Tabernacle up. The midrash clarified that Moses did not set it up by himself, for miracles were performed with it, and it rose of its own accord, for Exodus 40:17 says (using the passive voice), "The Tabernacle was reared up." And the midrash taught that Solomon's Temple, too, was built of its own accord. Similarly, noting that Exodus 40:17 reports that "the Tabernacle was reared up"—using the passive voice—another midrash told that when in Exodus 40:1–2 God told Moses to set up the Tabernacle, Moses protested that he did not know how to set it up. So God told Moses to begin working with his hands and make a show of setting it up, and the Tabernacle would stand up on its own. But God reassured Moses that God would record that Moses set it up, as Exodus 40:18 reports, "Moses reared up the Tabernacle."

Rav Havivi (or others say Rav Assi of Hozna'ah) deduced from the words, "And it came to pass in the first month of the second year, on the first day of the month," in Exodus 40:17 that the Tabernacle was erected on the first of Nisan. With reference to this, a Tanna taught that the first of Nisan took ten crowns of distinction by virtue of the ten momentous events that occurred on that day. The first of Nisan was: (1) the first day of the Creation, (2) the first day of the princes' offerings, (3) the first day for the priesthood to make the sacrificial offerings, (4) the first day for public sacrifice, (5) the first day for the descent of fire from Heaven, (6) the first for the priests' eating of sacred food in the sacred area, (7) the first for the dwelling of the Shechinah in Israel, (8) the first for the Priestly Blessing of Israel, (9) the first for the prohibition of the high places, and (10) the first of the months of the year.

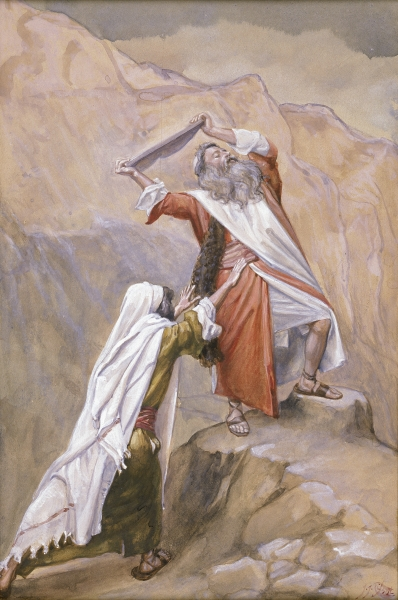
Moses Destroys the Tables of the Ten Commandments (gouache on board, c. 1896–1902 by James Tissot)

Rabbi Judah ha-Nasi taught that from Exodus 40:18, "And Moses erected the Tabernacle, and he laid its sockets, and set up its boards, and put in its bars, and erected its pillars," one can derive the principle that one does not descend in matters of sanctity. Judah ha-Nasi read the verse to teach that once Moses, who was at a higher level of sanctity than the rest of the people, began the work of erecting the Tabernacle, he alone completed it, as the involvement of any other people would have been considered a step down.

In Deuteronomy 18:15, Moses foretold that "A prophet will the Lord your God raise up for you . . . like me," and Rabbi Joḥanan thus taught that prophets would have to be, like Moses, strong, wealthy, wise, and meek. Strong, for Exodus 40:19 says of Moses, "he spread the tent over the Tabernacle," and a Master taught that Moses himself spread it, and Exodus 26:16 reports, "Ten cubits shall be the length of a board." Similarly, the strength of Moses can be derived from Deuteronomy 9:17, in which Moses reports, "And I took the two tablets, and cast them out of my two hands, and broke them," and it was taught that the tablets were six handbreadths in length, six in breadth, and three in thickness. Wealthy, as Exodus 34:1 reports God's instruction to Moses, "Carve yourself two tablets of stone," and the Rabbis interpreted the verse to teach that the chips would belong to Moses. Wise, for Rav and Samuel both said that 50 gates of understanding were created in the world, and all but one were given to Moses, for Psalm 8:6 said of Moses, "You have made him a little lower than God." Meek, for Numbers 12:3 reports, "Now the man Moses was very meek."

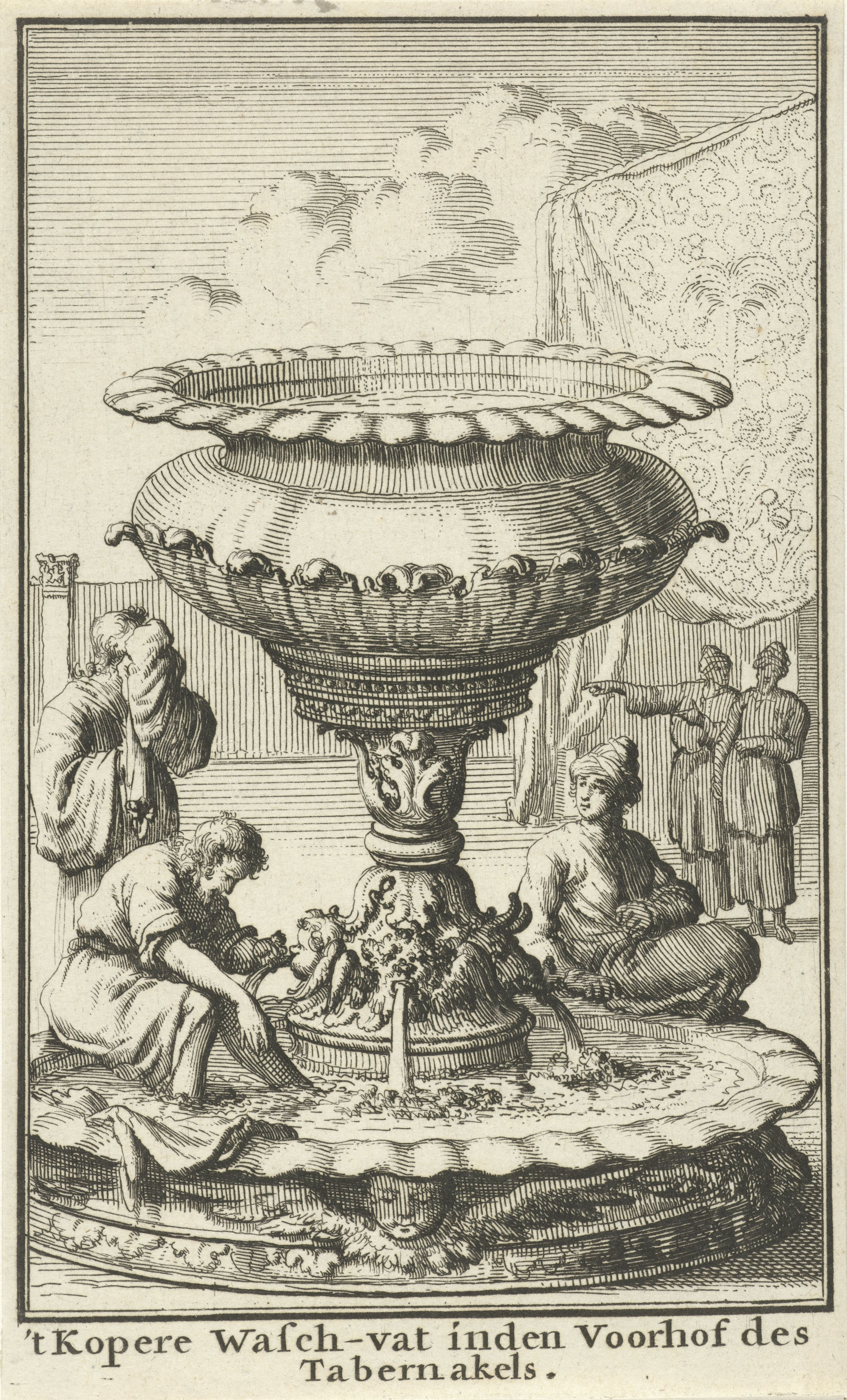
Engraving depicting the bronze laver in the court of the tabernacle by Willem Goeree (Dutch, 1683)

The Mishnah taught that any sacrifice performed by a priest who had not washed his hands and feet at the laver (described in Exodus 40:30–32) was invalid.

Rabbi Jose the son of Rabbi Ḥanina taught that a priest was not permitted to wash in a laver that did not contain enough water to wash four priests, for Exodus 40:31 says, "That Moses and Aaron and his sons might wash their hands and their feet thereat." ("His sons" implies at least two priests, and adding Moses and Aaron makes four.)

The Mishnah reported that the High Priest Ben Katin made 12 spigots for the laver, where there had been two before. Ben Katin also made a machine for the laver, so that its water would not become unfit by remaining overnight.

Rabbi Joshua of Siknin taught in the name of Rabbi Levi that the Tent of Meeting was like a cave by the sea that the sea fills when it becomes rough. Though the cave becomes filled, the sea loses nothing. So the glory of the Divine Presence, the Shechinah, filled the Tent of Meeting, and yet the world lost nothing of the Shechinah. And the Shechinah rested on the world on the day when Moses set up the Tabernacle.

A midrash taught that seven righteous men arose who brought the Shechinah down from the celestial to the terrestrial regions. Abraham brought it down from the seventh region to the sixth, Isaac brought it down from the sixth to the fifth, Jacob brought it down from the fifth to the fourth, Levi brought it down from the fourth to the third, Kohath brought it down from the third to the second, Amram brought it down from the second to the first, and Moses brought it down from the celestial to the terrestrial region. Rabbi Isaac read Psalm 37:29, "The righteous shall inherit the earth, and dwell (וְיִשְׁכְּנ֖וּ, veyishkenu) therein forever," to teach that the wicked caused the Shechinah (שכינה) to depart from the earth, but the righteous have caused the Shechinah to dwell (השכינו, hishkinu) on the earth. And the Shechinah came to rest on the earth on the day when Moses erected the Tabernacle, as Exodus 40:34 reports, "Then the cloud covered the tent of meeting, and the glory of the Lord filled the Tabernacle."

Rabbi Zerika asked about an apparent contradiction of Scriptural passages in the presence of Rabbi Eleazar, or, according to another version, he asked in the name of Rabbi Eleazar. Exodus 40:35 reads: "And Moses was not able to enter into the tent of meeting because the cloud abode thereon," whereas Exodus 24:18 says: "And Moses entered into the midst of the cloud." The Gemara concluded that this teaches us that God took hold of Moses and brought him into the cloud. Alternatively, the school of Rabbi Ishmael taught in a baraita that in Exodus 24:18, the word for "in the midst" (בְּתוֹךְ, be-tokh) appears, and it also appears in Exodus 14:22: "And the children of Israel went into the midst of the sea." Just as in Exodus 14:22, the word "in the midst" (בְּתוֹךְ, be-tokh) implies a path, as Exodus 14:22 says, "And the waters were a wall unto them," so here too in Exodus 24:18, there was a path (for Moses through the cloud).

Reading the words of Exodus 40:38, "For over the Tabernacle a cloud of God rested by day, and fire would appear in it by night," a midrash taught that when the Israelites saw the pillar of cloud resting on the Tabernacle, they rejoiced, thinking that God had been reconciled with them. But when night came, the pillar of fire descended and surrounded the Tabernacle. All the Israelites saw it as one flame of fire and began to weep in sorrow, feeling that they had labored (building the Tabernacle) for nothing, as all their work appeared to have been burnt up in a moment. When they arose early the next morning and saw the pillar of cloud encompassing the Tabernacle, they immediately rejoiced with an inordinate joy.

== In medieval Jewish interpretation ==
The parashah is discussed in these medieval Jewish sources:

=== Exodus chapter 38 ===
Baḥya ben Asher taught that just as God employed two separate attributes—that of Justice and that of Mercy—when creating the universe, so the Tabernacle was constructed principally by two separate craftsmen—Bezalel and Oholiab, as reported in Exodus 38:22–23. Bezalel was from the Tribe of Judah, representing the attribute of Mercy, and Oholiab was from the Tribe of Dan (דָן), representing the attribute of Justice (דִּין, din).

== In modern interpretation ==
The parashah is discussed in these modern sources:

=== Exodus chapter 38 ===
Exodus 38:24 reports that Bezalel and Oholiab used roughly a ton of gold in making the Tabernacle. According to one estimate, the metal listed in Exodus 38:24–29 amounted to 2,210 pounds of gold, 7,601 pounds of silver, and 5,350 pounds of copper. By comparison, an inscription from Bubastis reports that the Ancient Egyptian king Osorkon I dedicated more than 391 tons of gold and silver objects to Egyptian temples in the first four years of his reign. This table translates units of weight used in the Bible:

Weight Measurements in the Bible
Unit	Texts	Ancient Equivalent	Modern Equivalent
gerah (גֵּרָה)	Exodus 30:13; Leviticus 27:25; Numbers 3:47; 18:16; Ezekiel 45:12	1/20 shekel	6 grams; 0.21 ounces
bekah (בֶּקַע)	Genesis 24:22; Exodus 38:26	10 gerahs; half shekel	6 grams; 0.21 ounces
pim (פִים)	1 Samuel 13:21	2/3 shekel	8 grams; 0.28 ounces
shekel (שֶּׁקֶל)	Exodus 21:32; 30:13, 15, 24; 38:24, 25, 26, 29	20 gerahs; 2 bekahs	12 grams; 0.42 ounces
mina (maneh, מָּנֶה)	1 Kings 10:17; Ezekiel 45:12; Ezra 2:69; Nehemiah 7:70	50 shekels	0.6 kilograms; 1.3 pounds
talent (kikar, כִּכָּר)	Exodus 25:39; 37:24; 38:24, 25, 27, 29	3,000 shekels; 60 minas	36 kilograms; 79 pounds

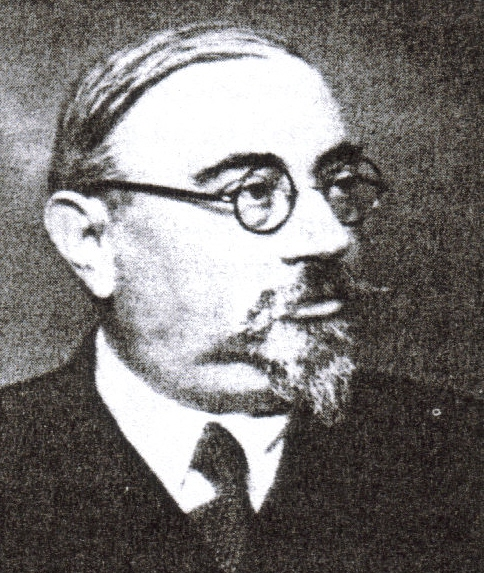
Cassuto

=== Exodus chapter 39 ===
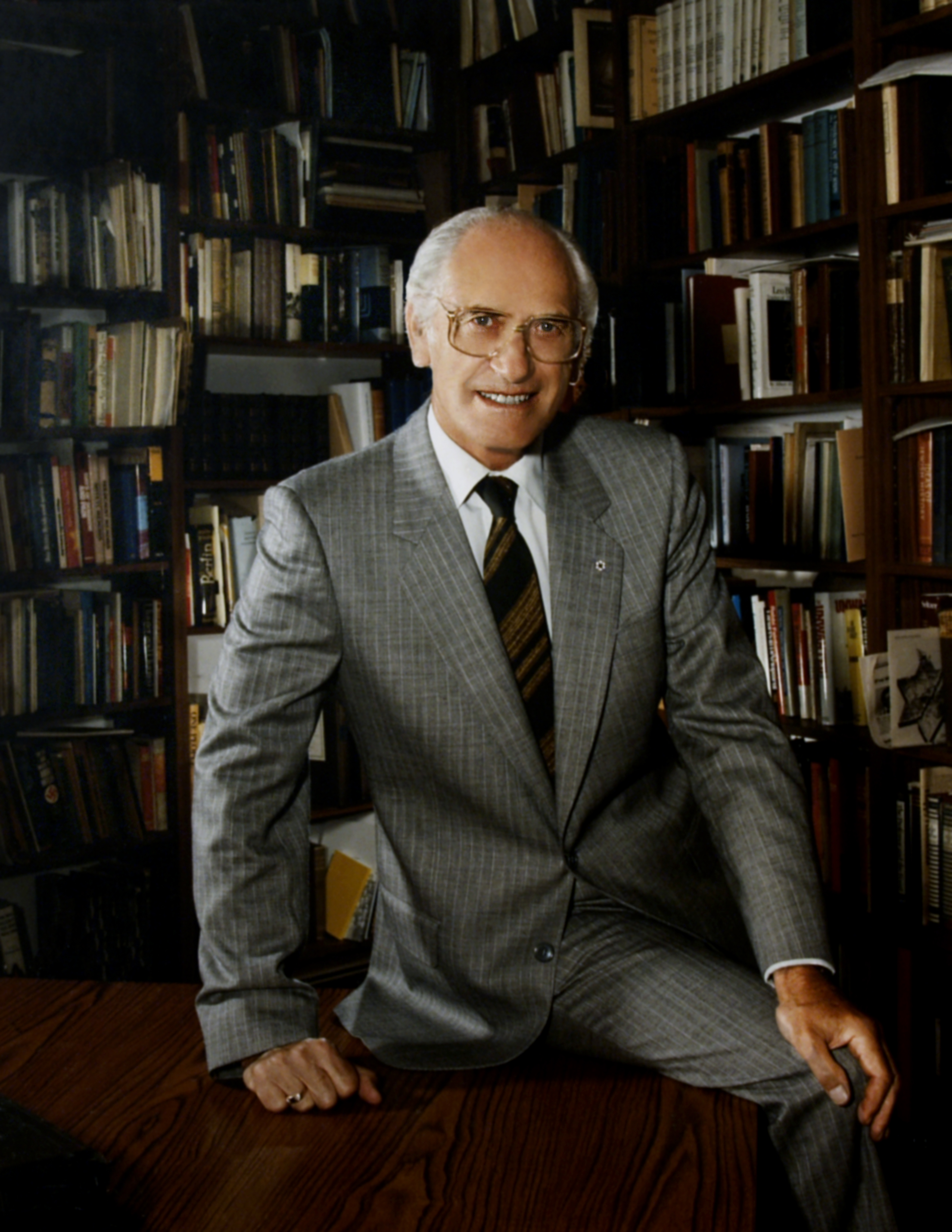
Plaut

Noting the juxtaposition of the two terms "Tabernacle" (מִשְׁכַּן, Mishkan) and "Tent of Meeting" (אֹהֶל מוֹעֵד, Ohel Mo’ed) in Exodus 39:32, 40; 40:2, 6, 29; Umberto Cassuto wrote that the two synonymous expressions stand in juxtaposition to stress the formal solemnity of the statement of the formal ending of the account of the Tabernacle's construction. Nahum Sarna wrote that the combination of the two distinct terms for the sanctuary together expresses its dual function as the symbol of the indwelling of the Divine Presence in the camp of Israel and as the site of communication between God and Moses. Gunther Plaut concluded that the two terms probably reflect two traditions, one using the term "Tabernacle" (מִשְׁכַּן, Mishkan) and the other the term "Tent" (אֹהֶל, Ohel). Plaut reported that the school of Julius Wellhausen considered the "Tent" tradition the older and the "Tabernacle" passages as retrojections of the Priestly source and therefore as largely unhistorical. Plaut reported that another theory assigned the Ark and Tabernacle to a northern and the Tent of Meeting to a southern source and held that David, by putting the Ark into the Tent in 2 Samuel 6:17, united the tribes and traditions and that thereafter the term "Tabernacle of the Tent of Meeting" (מִשְׁכַּן אֹהֶל מוֹעֵד, Mishkan Ohel Mo-ed) was coined.

=== Exodus chapter 40 ===
Moshe Greenberg wrote that one may see the entire Exodus story as “the movement of the fiery manifestation of the divine presence.” Similarly, William Propp identified fire (אֵשׁ, esh) as the medium in which God appears on the terrestrial plane—in the Burning Bush of Exodus 3:2, the cloud pillar of Exodus 13:21–22 and 14:24, atop Mount Sinai in Exodus 19:18 and 24:17, and upon the Tabernacle in Exodus 40:38.

Everett Fox noted that “glory” (כְּבוֹד, kevod) and “stubbornness” (כָּבֵד לֵב, kaved lev) are leading words throughout the book of Exodus that give it a sense of unity. Similarly, Propp identified the root kvd—connoting heaviness, glory, wealth, and firmness—as a recurring theme in Exodus: Moses suffered from a heavy mouth in Exodus 4:10 and heavy arms in Exodus 17:12; Pharaoh had firmness of heart in Exodus 7:14; 8:11, 28; 9:7, 34; and 10:1; Pharaoh made Israel's labor heavy in Exodus 5:9; God in response sent heavy plagues in Exodus 8:20; 9:3, 18, 24; and 10:14, so that God might be glorified over Pharaoh in Exodus 14:4, 17, and 18; and the book culminates with the descent of God's fiery Glory, described as a “heavy cloud,” first upon Sinai and later upon the Tabernacle in Exodus 19:16; 24:16–17; 29:43; 33:18, 22; and 40:34–38.

== Commandments ==
According to Maimonides and Sefer ha-Chinuch, there are no commandments in the parashah.

== In the liturgy ==
A midrash taught that on the day that Moses completed construction of the Tabernacle (as reported in Exodus 40:33), he composed Psalm 91, which Jews read in the Pesukei D'Zimrah section of the morning Shacharit prayer service.

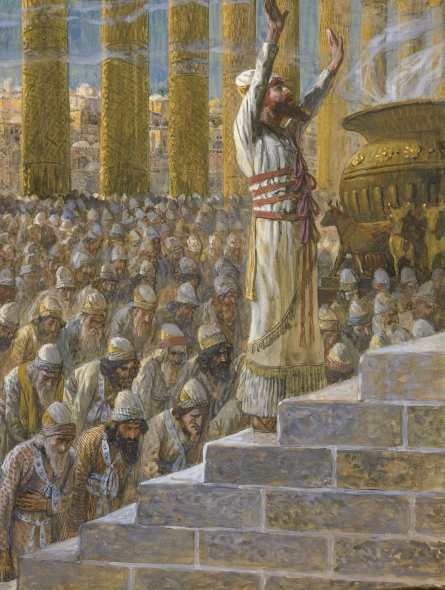
Solomon Dedicates the Temple at Jerusalem (gouache on board, c. 1896–1902 by James Tissot)

== Haftarah ==
=== Generally ===
The haftarah for the parashah when there is no special Sabbath is:

- for Sephardi Jews: 1 Kings 7:40–50
- for Ashkenazi Jews: 1 Kings 7:51–8:21

==== Sephardi—1 Kings 7:40–50 ====
Both the parashah and the haftarah in 1 Kings 7:40–50 report the leader's erection of the holy place—Moses' setting up the Tabernacle in the parashah, and Solomon's building of the Temple in Jerusalem in the haftarah. Both the parashah and the haftarah report that the builders finished the work: "Moses finished the work" (וַיְכַל מֹשֶׁה, אֶת-הַמְּלָאכָה, vayechal Mosheh et ha-melachah) in Exodus 40:33, and "so Hiram made an end of doing all the work" (וַיְכַל חִירָם, לַעֲשׂוֹת אֶת-כָּל-הַמְּלָאכָה, vayechal Chiram la'asot et kol ha-melachah) in 1 Kings 7:40.

==== Ashkenazi—1 Kings 7:51–8:21 ====
Similarly, both the parashah and the haftarah in 1 Kings 7:51–8:21 report the finishing of the leaders' work: "Moses finished the work" (וַיְכַל מֹשֶׁה, אֶת-הַמְּלָאכָה, vayechal Mosheh et ha-melachah) in Exodus 40:33, and "all the work that king Solomon wrought . . . was finished" (וַתִּשְׁלַם, כָּל-הַמְּלָאכָה, אֲשֶׁר עָשָׂה הַמֶּלֶךְ שְׁלֹמֹה, vatishlam kol ha-melachah asher asah ha-melech Shlomoh) in 1 Kings 7:51. And in both the parashah and the haftarah, a cloud and the Presence of the Lord fill the Sanctuary, indicating God's approval.

=== Parashat Vayakhel–Pekudei ===
When Parashat Vayakhel is combined with Parashat Pekudei and there is no special Sabbath, the haftarah is:

- for Ashkenazi Jews: 1 Kings 7:51–8:21
- for Sephardi Jews: 1 Kings 7:40–50

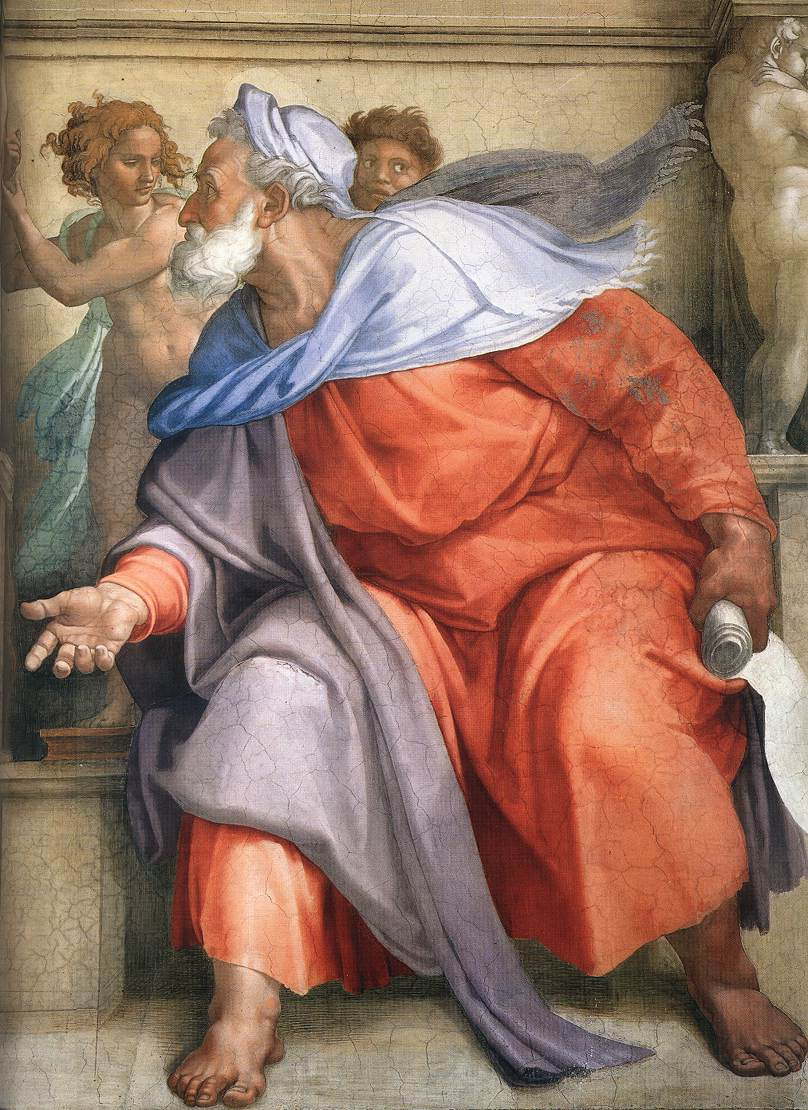
Ezekiel (Sistine Chapel ceiling fresco by Michelangelo, 1510)

==== On Shabbat HaChodesh ====
When the parashah coincides with Shabbat HaChodesh ("Sabbath [of] the month," the special Sabbath preceding the Hebrew month of Nissan), as it does in 2025, 2026, 2028, 2031, 2034, 2037, 2040, 2044, 2045, 2047, and 2048, the haftarah is:

- for Ashkenazi Jews: Ezekiel 45:16–46:18.
- for Sephardi Jews: Ezekiel 45:18–46:15.

On Shabbat HaChodesh, Jews read Exodus 12:1–20, in which God commands that "This month (Nissan) shall be the beginning of months; it shall be the first month of the year," and in which God issued the commandments of Passover. Similarly, the haftarah in Ezekiel 45:21–25 discusses Passover. In both the parashah and the haftarah, God instructs the Israelites to apply blood to doorposts.

==== On Shabbat Parah ====
When the parashah coincides with Shabbat Parah (the special Sabbath prior to Passover—as it does in 2029, 2032, 2036, 2039, and 2042), the haftarah is:

- for Ashkenazi Jews: Ezekiel 36:16–38.
- for Sephardi Jews: Ezekiel 36:16–36.

On Shabbat Parah, the Sabbath of the red heifer, Jews read Numbers 19:1–22, which describes the rites of purification using the red heifer (פָרָה אֲדֻמָּה, parah adumah). Similarly, the haftarah in Ezekiel 36 also describes purification. In both the special reading and the haftarah in Ezekiel 36, sprinkled water cleansed the Israelites.

=== On Shabbat Shekalim ===
When the parashah coincides with the special Sabbath Shabbat Shekalim (as it does in 2035), the haftarah is 2 Kings 12:1–17.

=== On Shabbat Rosh Chodesh ===
When the parashah coincides with Shabbat Rosh Chodesh, the haftarah is Isaiah 66:1–24.
