= Medieval Jerusalem =

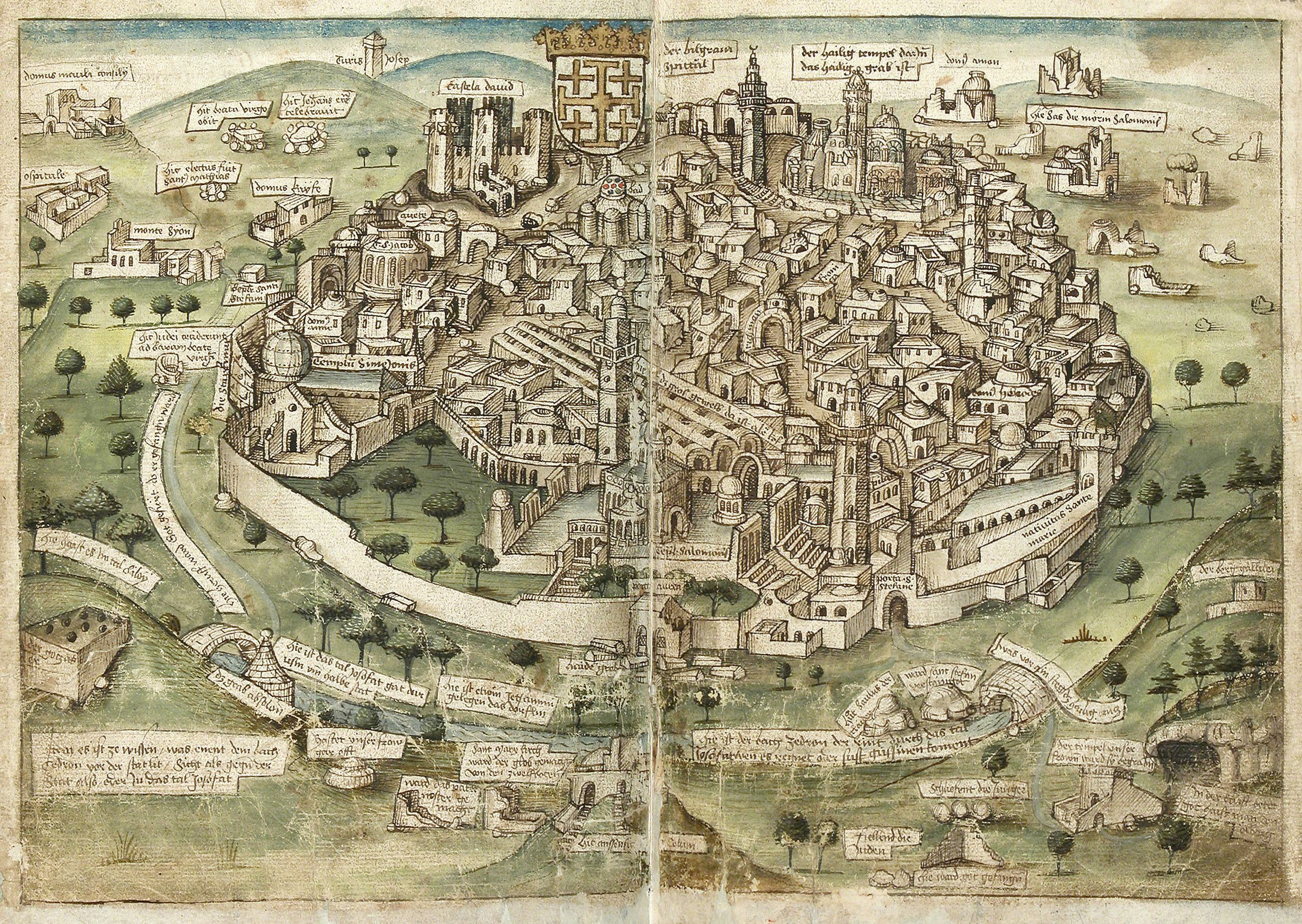
View of Jerusalem (Conrad Grünenberg, 1487)

Jerusalem in the Middle Ages was a major Byzantine metropolis from the 4th century CE before the advent of the early Islamic period. In the 7th century Jerusalem became the regional capital of Jund Filastin under successive caliphates. In the later Islamic period experienced a period of further contested ownership, war and decline. Muslim rule was interrupted for 200 years by the Crusades and the establishment of the Christian Kingdom of Jerusalem. At the tail end of the Medieval period, the city was ceded to the Ottomans in 1517, who maintained control until the arrival of the British in 1917.

Under the rule of the Fatimid caliphate beginning in the late 10th century, the population dropped from about 200,000 to less than half by the time of the Christian conquest in 1099. Many of the remaining inhabitants were massacred by the Crusaders in the Siege of Jerusalem. Under the Kingdom of Jerusalem, the population grew, but less than 2,000 remained after the Khwarezmi Turks took the city in 1244.

Jerusalem remained a backwater under the Ayyubids, Mameluks and Ottomans, and would not again exceed a population of 10,000 until the 16th century.

== Terminology ==
The term Middle Ages (in other words: the medieval period) in regard to the history of Jerusalem, is defined by archaeologists such as S. Weksler-Bdolah as the time span consisting of the 12th and 13th centuries.

== Byzantine rule ==
Jerusalem reached a peak in size and population at the end of the Second Temple period: The city covered two square kilometers (0.8 sq mi.) and had a population of 200,000. In the five centuries following the Bar Kokhba revolt in the 2nd century, the city remained under Roman then Byzantine rule. During the 4th century, the Roman Emperor Constantine I constructed Christian sites in Jerusalem such as the Church of the Holy Sepulchre.

John Cassian, a Christian monk and theologian who spent several years in Bethlehem during the late 4th century, wrote that 'Jerusalem can be taken in four senses: historically as the city of the Jews; allegorically as 'Church of Christ', analogically as the heavenly city of God 'which is the mother of us all,' topologically, as the soul of man".

In 603, Pope Gregory I commissioned the Ravennate Abbot Probus, who was previously Gregory's emissary at the Lombard court, to build a hospital in Jerusalem to treat and care for Christian pilgrims to the Holy Land. In 800, Charlemagne enlarged Probus' hospital and added a library to it, but it was destroyed in 1005 by Al-Hakim bi-Amr Allah along with three thousand other buildings in Jerusalem.

From the days of Constantine until the Arab conquest in 637/38, despite intensive lobbying by Judeo-Byzantines, Jews were forbidden to enter the city. Following the Arab capture of Jerusalem, the Jews were allowed back into the city by Muslim rulers such as Umar ibn al-Khattab. During the 8th to 11th centuries, Jerusalem's prominence gradually diminished as the Arab powers in the region jockeyed for control.

== Early Muslim period (637/38–1099) ==
Throughout the Early Muslim and Crusader periods, up until Saladin's conquest of 1187, Jerusalem retained a sizable Christian majority, which only ceased to exist once Saladin removed the Frankish population in 1187.

During the early centuries of Muslim rule, especially under the Umayyad (661–750) and Abbasid (750–969) dynasties, the city prospered; the 10th-century geographers Ibn Hawqal and al-Istakhri describe it as "the most fertile province of Palestine", while its native son, geographer al-Muqaddasi (born 946) devoted many pages to its praises in his most famous work, The Best Divisions in the Knowledge of the Climes. Jerusalem under Muslim rule, however, did not achieve the political or cultural status enjoyed by the capitals Damascus, Baghdad, Cairo etc.

With the decline of the Carolingian Empire, which split up in 888, a period of anti-Christian persecution by the Muslims began. However, the recovered Byzantines filled this void and as the Empire expanded under the Byzantine Crusades, Christians were again allowed to make pilgrimages to Jerusalem.

== Crusader control ==
Animation of 12th-century Jerusalem (correct depiction: Church of the Holy Sepulchre; faulty: citadel [fantasy], Dome of the Rock [Ottoman tile decoration, modern gilded dome]); in Latin with English subtitles (via 'cc' button)

Reports of the renewed killing of Christian pilgrims, and the defeat of the Byzantine Empire by the Seljuqs, led to the First Crusade. Europeans marched to recover the Holy Land, and on July 15, 1099, Christian soldiers were victorious in the one-month Siege of Jerusalem. In keeping with their alliance with the Muslims, the Jews had been among the most vigorous defenders of Jerusalem against the Crusaders. When the city fell, the Crusaders slaughtered most of the city's Muslim and Jewish inhabitants, leaving the city "knee deep in blood".

Jerusalem became the capital of the Kingdom of Jerusalem. Christian settlers from the West set about rebuilding the principal shrines associated with the life of Christ. The Church of the Holy Sepulchre was ambitiously rebuilt as a great Romanesque church, and Muslim shrines on the Temple Mount (the Dome of the Rock and the Al-Aqsa Mosque) were converted for Christian purposes. The Military Orders of the Knights Hospitaller and the Knights Templar were established during this period. Both grew out of the need to protect and care for the great influx of pilgrims traveling to Jerusalem, especially since Bedouin enslavement raids and terror attacks upon the roads by the remaining Muslim population continued. King Baldwin II of Jerusalem allowed the forming order of the Templars to set up a headquarters in the captured Al-Aqsa Mosque. The Crusaders believed the Mosque to have been built on top of the ruins of the Temple of Solomon (or rather his royal palace), and therefore referred to the Mosque as "Solomon's Temple", in Latin "Templum Solomonis". It was from this location that the Order took its name of "Temple Knights" or "Templars".

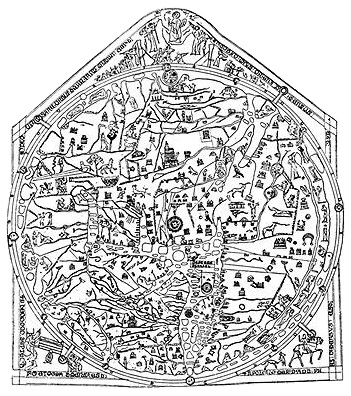
The Hereford Mappa Mundi (c. 1280), depicting Jerusalem at the center of the world

Under the Kingdom of Jerusalem the area experienced a great revival, including the re-establishment of the city and harbour of Caesarea, the restoration and fortification of the city of Tiberias, the expansion of the city of Ashkelon, the walling and rebuilding of Jaffa, the reconstruction of Bethlehem, the repopulation of dozens of towns, the restoration of large agriculture, and the construction of hundreds of churches, cathedrals, and castles. The old hospice, rebuilt in 1023 on the site of the monastery of Saint John the Baptist, was expanded into an infirmary under Hospitaller grand master Raymond du Puy de Provence near the Church of the Holy Sepulchre.

In 1173 Benjamin of Tudela visited Jerusalem. He described it as a small city full of Jacobites, Armenians, Greeks, and Georgians. Two hundred Jews dwelt in a corner of the city under the Tower of David.

In 1187, with the Muslim world united under the effective leadership of Saladin, Jerusalem was re-conquered by the Muslims after a successful siege. As part of this same campaign the armies of Saladin conquered, expelled, enslaved, or killed the remaining Christian communities of Galilee, Samaria, Judea, as well as the coastal towns of Ashkelon, Jaffa, Caesarea, and Acre.

In 1219 the walls of the city were razed by order of Al-Mu'azzam, the Ayyubid sultan of Damascus. This rendered Jerusalem defenseless and dealt a heavy blow to the city's status.

Following another Crusade by the Holy Roman Emperor Frederick II in 1227, the city was surrendered by Saladin's descendant al-Kamil, in accordance with a diplomatic treaty in 1228. It remained under Christian control, under the treaty's terms that no walls or fortifications could be built in the city or along the strip which united it with the coast. In 1239, after the ten-year truce expired, Frederick ordered the rebuilding of the walls. But without the formidable Crusader army he had originally employed ten years previous, his goals were effectively thwarted when the walls were again demolished by an-Nasir Da'ud, the emir of Kerak, in the same year.

In 1243 Jerusalem was firmly secured into the power of the Christian Kingdom, and the walls were repaired. However, the period was extremely brief as a large army of Turkish and Persian Muslims was advancing from the north.

== Khwarezmian control ==
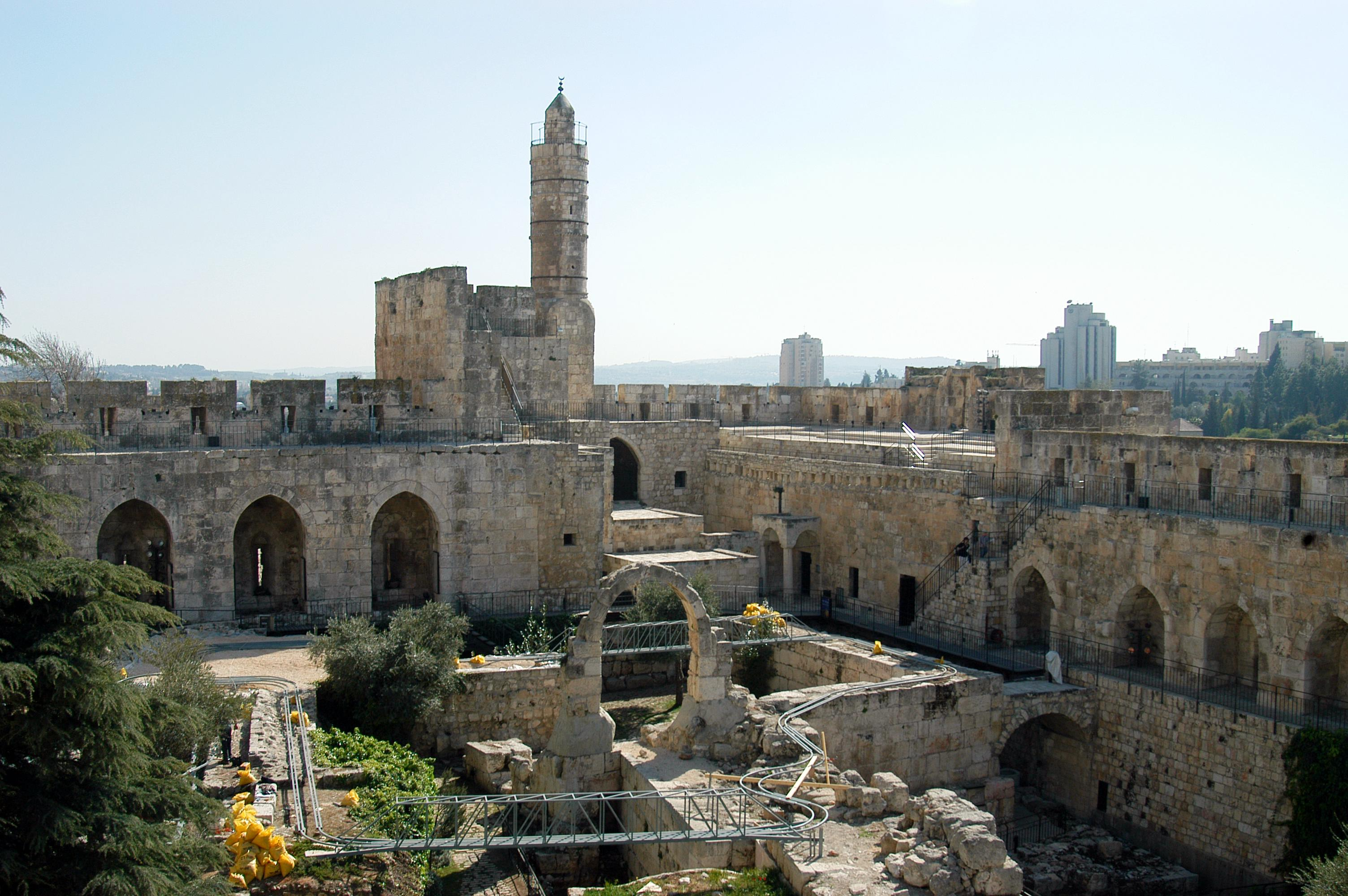
Medieval Tower of David in Jerusalem today

Jerusalem fell again in 1244 to the Khwarazmian Empire, who had been displaced by the Mongol invasion of Khwarazm. As the Khwarezmians moved west, they allied with the Egyptians, under the Egyptian Ayyubid sultan as-Salih Ayyub. He recruited his horsemen from the Khwarezmians and directed the remains of the Khwarezmian Empire into the Levant, where he wanted to organize a strong defense against the Mongols.

In keeping with his goal, the main effect of the Khwarezmians was to slaughter the local population, especially in Jerusalem. Their Siege of Jerusalem began on July 11, 1244, and the city's citadel, the so-called Tower of David, surrendered on August 23. The Khwarezmians then ruthlessly decimated the population, leaving only 2,000 people, Christians and Muslims, still living in the city. This attack triggered the Europeans to respond with the Seventh Crusade, although the new forces of King Louis IX of France never even achieved success in Egypt, let alone advancing as far as Palestine.

== Ayyubid control ==
After having troubles with the Khwarezmians, Sultan as-Salih began ordering armed expeditions to raid Christian communities and capture men, women and children. Called razzias, or by their original Arabic name ghazw (sing.: ghazwa or ghaza), the raids extended into Caucasia, the Black Sea, Byzantium, and the coastal areas of Europe.

The captives were divided according to category and ability. Women were generally employed as domestic servants, while men were made to serve in various capacities or, in some cases, executed. Young boys and girls were sent to religious instructors (imams) for education and conversion to Islam. According to ability the young boys were then made into eunuchs or sent into decades-long training as mamluk (slave soldiers). This army of indoctrinated slaves was forged into a potent armed force. The Sultan then used this new army to eliminate the Khwarezmians, and Jerusalem returned to Ayyubid rule in 1247.

== Mamluk control and Mongol raids ==
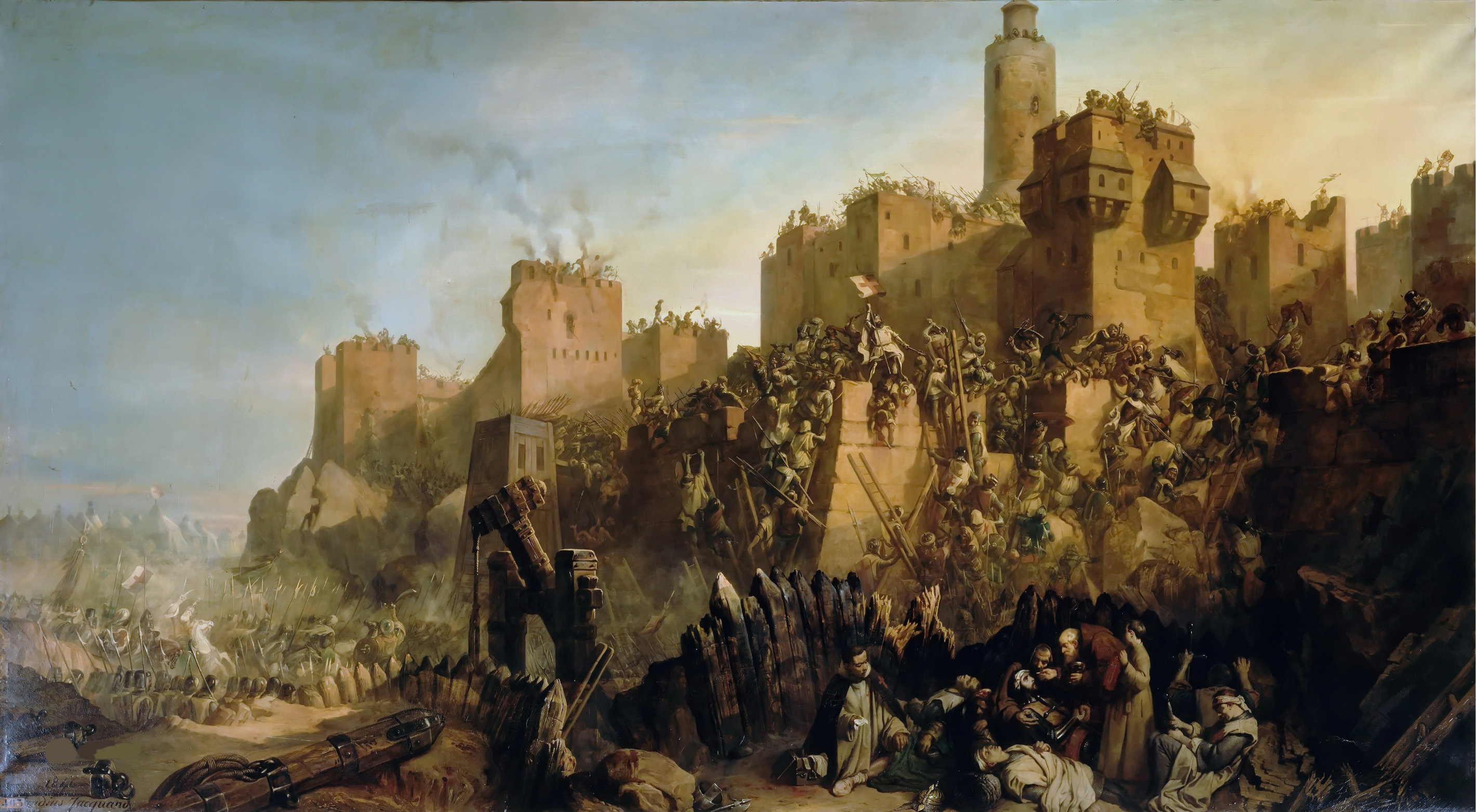
"Jacques Molay takes Jerusalem, 1299", a fanciful painting created in the 19th century by Claudius Jacquand, and hanging in the "Hall of Crusades" in Versailles. In reality, though the Mongols may have been technically in control of the city for a few months in early 1300 (since the Mamluks had temporarily retreated to Cairo and no other troops were in the area), there was no such battle, and De Molay was almost certainly on the island of Cyprus at that time, nowhere near the landlocked city of Jerusalem.

When al-Salih died, his widow, the slave Shajar al-Durr, took power as Sultana, which power she then transferred to the Mamluk leader Aybeg, who became Sultan in 1250. Meanwhile, the Christian rulers of Antioch and Cilician Armenia subjected their territories to Mongol authority, and fought alongside the Mongols during the Empire's expansion into Iraq and Syria. In 1260, a portion of the Mongol army advanced toward Egypt, and was engaged by the Mamluks in Galilee, at the pivotal Battle of Ain Jalut. The Mamluks were victorious, and the Mongols retreated. In early 1300, there were again some Mongol raids into the southern Levant, shortly after the Mongols had been successful in capturing cities in northern Syria; however, the Mongols occupied the area for only a few weeks, and then retreated again to Iran. The Mamluks regrouped and re-asserted control over the southern Levant a few months later, with little resistance.

There is little evidence to indicate whether or not the Mongol raids penetrated Jerusalem in either 1260 or 1300. Historical reports from the time period tend to conflict, depending on which nationality of historian was writing the report. There were also a large number of rumors and urban legends in Europe, claiming that the Mongols had captured Jerusalem and were going to return it to the Crusaders. However, these rumors turned out to be false. The general consensus of modern historians is that though Jerusalem may or may not have been subject to raids, that there was never any attempt by the Mongols to incorporate Jerusalem into their administrative system, which is what would be necessary to deem a territory "conquered" as opposed to "raided".

== Mamluk rebuilding ==
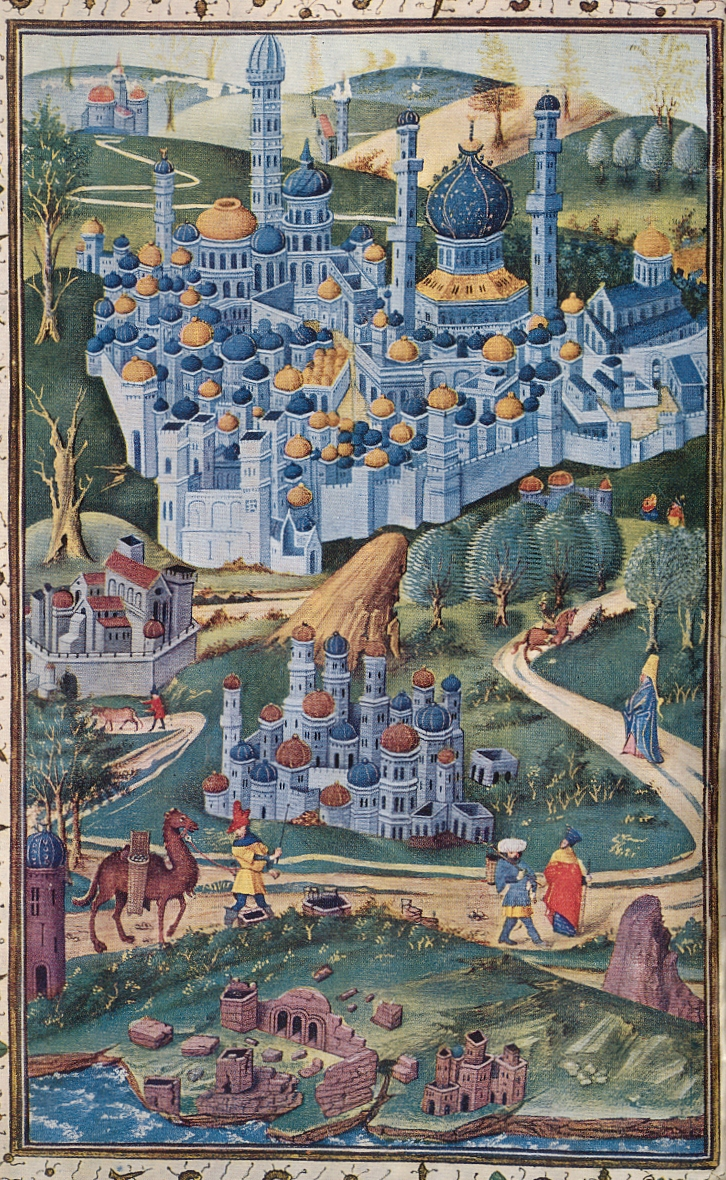
1450s depiction of the city by Jean Miélot.

Even during the conflicts, pilgrims continued to come in small numbers. Pope Nicholas IV negotiated an agreement with the Mamluk sultan to allow Latin clergy to serve in the Church of the Holy Sepulchre. With the Sultan's agreement, Pope Nicholas, a Franciscan himself, sent a group of friars to keep the Latin liturgy going in Jerusalem. With the city little more than a backwater, they had no formal quarters, and simply lived in a pilgrim hostel, until in 1300 King Robert of Sicily gave a large gift of money to the Sultan. Robert asked that the Franciscans be allowed to have the Sion Church, the Mary Chapel in the Holy Sepulchre, and the Nativity Cave, and the Sultan gave his permission. But the remainder of the Christian holy places were kept in decay.

Mamluk sultans made a point of visiting the city, endowing new buildings, encouraging Muslim settlement, and expanding mosques. During the reign of Sultan Baibars, the Mamluks renewed the Muslim alliance with the Jews and he established two new sanctuaries, one to Moses near Jericho and one to Salih near Ramla, to encourage numerous Muslim and Jewish pilgrims to be in the area at the same time as the Christians, who filled the city during Easter. In 1267 Nahmanides (also known as Ramban) made aliyah. In the Old City he established the Ramban Synagogue, the oldest active synagogue in Jerusalem. However, the city had no great political power, and was in fact considered by the Mamluks as a place of exile for out-of-favor officials. The city itself was ruled by a low-ranking emir.

Following the persecutions of Jews during the Black Death, a group of Ashkenazi Jews led by Rabbi Isaac Asir HaTikvah immigrated to Jerusalem and founded a yeshiva. This group was part of the nucleus of what later became a much larger community in the Ottoman period.

== Ottoman era ==
In 1517, Jerusalem and its environs fell to the Ottoman Turks, who would maintain control of the city until the 20th century. Although the Europeans no longer controlled any territory in the Holy Land, Christian presence including Europeans remained in Jerusalem. During the Ottomans this presence increased as Greeks under Turkish Sultan patronage re-established, restored, or reconstructed Orthodox Churches, hospitals, and communities. This era saw the first expansion outside the Old City walls, as new neighborhoods were established to relieve the overcrowding that had become so prevalent. The first of these new neighborhoods included the Russian Compound and the Jewish Mishkenot Sha'ananim, both founded in 1860.

== Bibliography ==
- Armstrong, Karen (1996). Jerusalem: One City, Three Faiths. Random House. ISBN 0-679-43596-4.
- Avni, Gideon (2014). The Byzantine-Islamic Transition in Palestine: An Archaeological Approach. Oxford University Press. ISBN 9780199684335.
- Demurger, Alain (2007). Jacques de Molay (in French). Editions Payot & Rivages. ISBN 978-2-228-90235-9.
- Hazard, Harry W.; Kenneth M. Setton, eds. (1975). Volume III: The Fourteenth and Fifteenth Centuries. A History of the Crusades. The University of Wisconsin Press. ISBN 0-299-06670-3.
- Jackson, Peter (2005). The Mongols and the West: 1221–1410. Longman. ISBN 978-0-582-36896-5.
- Maalouf, Amin (1984). The Crusades Through Arab Eyes. New York: Schocken Books. ISBN 0-8052-0898-4.
- Newman, Sharan (2006). Real History Behind the Templars. Berkley Publishing Group. ISBN 978-0-425-21533-3.
- Nicolle, David (2001). The Crusades. Essential Histories. Osprey Publishing. ISBN 978-1-84176-179-4.
- Richard, Jean (1996). Histoire des Croisades. Fayard. ISBN 2-213-59787-1.
- Riley-Smith, Jonathan (2005) [1987]. The Crusades: A History (2nd ed.). Yale Nota Bene. ISBN 0-300-10128-7.
- Riley-Smith, Jonathan (2002). The Oxford History of the Crusades. Oxford University Press. ISBN 0-19-280312-3.
- Runciman, Steven (1987). A history of the Crusades. Vol. 3, The Kingdom of Acre and the Late Crusades (reprint; in 1952–1954 1st ed.). Penguin Books. ISBN 978-0-14-013705-7.
- Schaefer, K. R. (1985). Jerusalem in the Ayyubid and Mamluk eras. New York University (Thesis). ProQuest 303392349.
- Schein, Sylvia (October 1979). "Gesta Dei per Mongolos 1300. The Genesis of a Non-Event". The English Historical Review. 94 (373): 805–819. doi:10.1093/ehr/XCIV.CCCLXXIII.805. JSTOR 565554.
- Schein, Sylvia (1991). Fideles Crucis: The Papacy, the West, and the Recovery of the Holy Land. Clarendon. ISBN 0-19-822165-7.
- Schein, Sylvia (2005). Gateway to the Heavenly City: crusader Jerusalem and the catholic West. Ashgate Publishing, Ltd. ISBN 0-7546-0649-X.
- Sinor, Denis (1999). "The Mongols in the West". Journal of Asian History. 33 (1).

== See also ==
- Aelia Capitolina
- Demographic history of Jerusalem
- Kingdom of Jerusalem
- Old City of Jerusalem
