= Yalkut =

There are several rabbinical works that bear the title "Yalkut" (Anthology):

Yalkut may refer to:

- Yalkut Makiri
- Yalqut Reubeni, a 17th-century collection of midrashim by Rabbi Reuben Hoschke Kohen
- Yalkut Reuveni
- Yalkut Shimoni, an aggadic compilation on the books of the Hebrew Bible
- Yalkut Yosef, an authoritative, contemporary work of Halakha

== See also ==
- Jud Yalkut (1938–2013), experimental film and video maker
