= Zutta =

Zutta may refer to:

- Derekh Eretz Zutta, non-canonical tractate of the Babylonian Talmud
- Devarim Zutta, midrash to Deuteronomy which is no longer extant except in references by later authorities
- Seder Olam Zutta, anonymous chronicle, called "Zuṭa" to distinguish it from the older Seder 'Olam Rabbah
- Shir ha-Shirim Zutta, midrash, or, rather, homiletic commentary, on Canticles
- Sifre Zutta, midrash on the Book of Numbers
