= Shir ha-Shirim Zutta =

Shir ha-Shirim Zutta (Hebrew: שיר השירים, romanized: Shīr ha-Shīrīm) is a midrash (homiletic commentary) on Shir ha-Shirim (the Song of Songs).

== Name ==
It is referred to in the various Yalkutim and by the ancient Biblical commentators as "Midrash Shir haShirim," or "Aggadat Shir haShirim."

The De Rossi Manuscript No. 541, at Parma, was discovered by S. Buber to contain (among other things) midrashim on four of the five "megillot": Song of Songs, Ruth, Lamentations, and Ecclesiastes. He published these under the title of "Midrash Zutta," to distinguish them from "Midrash Rabbah." At the same time, the midrash to Song of Songs only was published by S. Schechter, under the title "Agadat Shir haShirim".

== Characteristics ==
Shir haShirim Zutta is very different in nature from Shir haShirim Rabbah. Zutta is a homiletic commentary on the whole text, and does not contain any proems; some verses are treated at length, while others are dismissed very briefly, sometimes only one word being discussed. Although the two collections contain a few parallels, Rabbah does not contain those numerous aggadot which especially distinguish Zutta. The messianic aggadot on verses 5:2 and 5:6 may be derived from Pirkei De-Rabbi Eliezer; the name of R. Eleazar (or Eliezer) quoted in the part on Shir haShirim 5:2, as well as the messianic prediction attributed there to Simeon ben Shetach, support this supposition. Other passages are found in the Babylonian Talmud, the Pesiktot, the Midrash Rabbot, the Mekhilta, and the Avot de-Rabbi Natan.

S. Buber supposes that this midrash has been shortened by the copyists, for R. Hillel, in his commentary on Sifre, quotes from a "Midrash Shir haShirim" a passage which is found neither in Rabbah nor in Zutta. Nor is the passage quoted from the Midrash Shir haShirim by Menahem Zioni found in this midrash. Schechter argues that the 10th-century poet Solomon ben Judah ha-Bavli had this midrash before him, and wove several passages from it into his piyyutim. Accepting this theory, Schechter thinks that it was composed not later than the mid-10th century; he likewise points out resemblances to the various Messianic and eschatological midrashim published by A. Jellinek, and especially to the Perek R. Yoshiyahu, and holds that this midrash may date to the early 9th century. But considering that the Pirkei De-Rabbi Eliezer (which was composed about the mid-9th century) is one of the sources of the Aggadat Shir haShirim, this date must be rejected.

== Later usage ==
Shir haShirim Zutta is most often quoted in Yalkut Shimoni and Yalḳuṭ ha-Makiri. Yalkut Shimoni used it as a basis for its commentary on Shir haShirim, but also quotes it in the commentary to other Biblical books. In Yalkut Shimoni, the name "Pesikta Rabbati" is used for Shir haShirim Rabbah, while Zutta is always referred to as "Midrash Shir haShirim." The author of Yalkut Shimoni may have applied this name to Rabbah because the two works were bound together; on the other hand, the occurrence of the name may be due to an error of the copyist. In Yalḳuṭ ha-Makiri, Shir haShirim Zutta is quoted 19 times under the name of "Haggadat Shir haShirim" on Isaiah alone.

It is quoted also by other ancient authorities. Judah b. Barzilai quotes it (under the name "Aggadta Shir haShirim") in regard to the seventy eulogistic names given by God to Israel. Nahmanides cites it as "Midrash Shir haShirim"; so does his pupil (teacher?) Azriel, in the commentary on Shir haShirim generally ascribed to Naḥmanides himself. Abraham the son of Maimonides calls it "Aggadat Shir haShirim"; Recanati cites the same passage quoted by Judah b. Barzilai.

In addition, passages from this midrash are found in Eleazar b. Tobiah's Lekach Tov and Isaac ibn Sahulah's Mashal ha-Kadmoni. Although these do not mention the name of this midrash, S. Schechter supposes that they probably used ancient homiletic commentaries, among others Shir haShirim Zutta.
