= Judah ben Solomon =

Judah ben Solomon may refer to:

- Judah ben Solomon Canpanton (14th century), philosopher
- Judah ben Solomon ha-Kohen (c. 1215–c. 1274), Spanish philosopher, astronomer, and mathematician
- Judah ben Solomon Harizi (c. 1165–1225), Spanish rabbi, translator, and poet
- Judah ben Solomon Taitazak (15th and 16th centuries), Ottoman Talmudist
- Nathan Judah ben Solomon (14th century), Provençal physician and scholar

== See also ==
- Solomon ben Judah (disambiguation)
