= Paolo Riccio =

Paolo Riccio (1480 - 1541) was a German convert from Orthodox Judaism to Roman Catholicism and Renaissance humanist during the first half of the sixteenth century. He became professor of philosophy in the University of Pavia; subsequently, he was physician to Emperor Maximilian I.

Riccio was inclined to astrology and the Cabala, and had a controversy with Johann Eck about the existence of life on the stellar bodies. Erasmus thought very highly of Riccio, who defended him and his followers against the attacks of Stephen the Presbyter. Like many other converts from Judaism both before and since, Riccio attempted to convince other Jewish people of the truth of the New Testament. He, moreover, advised the Nations of Christendom to unite against the common threat of invasion and conquest by the Ottoman Empire.

Riccio was a prolific writer and, as Heinrich Graetz says, "turned to good account the small amount of Jewish knowledge which he brought with him to Christianity". His best-known work is his De Porta Lucis R. Josephi Gecatilia (Augsburg, 1516), which is a free translation of a part of the Kabbalistic work Sha'are Orah by Joseph Gikatilla. Jerome Riccio (Hieronymus Ricius), Paulo's son, sent a copy of this work to Johann Reuchlin, who utilized it in the composition of his De Arte Cabbalistica.

Riccio relates that he was ordered by Emperor Maximilian to prepare a Latin translation of the Talmud. All that has come down of it are the translations of the tractates Berakot, Sanhedrin, and Makkot (Augsburg, 1519), which are the earliest Latin renderings of the Mishnah known to bibliographers.

The most important of his other works is De Cælesti Agricultura, a large religio-philosophical work in four parts, dedicated to Emperor Charles V and to his brother Ferdinand (Augsburg, 1541; 2d ed., Basel, 1597). His Opuscula Varia, which contains a treatise on the 613 commandments, a religio-philosophical and controversial work aiming to demonstrate to the Jews the truths of Christianity, and an introduction to the Cabala followed by a compilation of its rules and dogmas, went through four editions (Pavia, 1510; Augsburg, 1515; ib. 1541; and Basel, 1597).

Riccio wrote besides these works about ten others, all in Latin, on various religious, philosophical, and cabalistic subjects, which appeared in Augsburg in 1546 and were reprinted in Basel in 1597.

== Sources ==
- Adams: History of the Jews, p. 286, London, 1840;
- Bischoff: Kritische Geschichte der Thalmud-Uebersetzungen, pp. 34, 43, 44, Frankfort-on-the-Main, 1899;
- Fürst, Bibl. Jud. ii. 41, iii. 155;
- Ginsburg, Massoret ha-Massoret, p. 9, London, 1867;
- Grätz, Gesch. ix. 172 et seq.;
- Michelsen: Israel und die Kirche, pp. 87 et seq., Hamburg, 1869
