= Isaac Asir HaTikvah =

14th-century Ashkenazi Rabbinic leader

Isaac HaLevi Asir HaTikvah (Hebrew: הר״ר יצחק הלוי אסיר התקוה) (died c. 1377), also known as Isaac of Beilstein, was a 14th-century Ashkenazi Rabbinic leader.

In two Medieval sources Isaac is referred to as the Gadol Hador, literally the "Head of the Generation", attesting to his prestigious status. Professor Elchanan Reiner believes that Isaac would have only been referred to by this title after the death of Alexander Suslin.

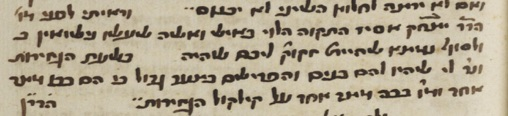
A recording in Kitzur HaMordechai of an emotionally difficult case brought to Rabbi Isaac

Isaac originally had a yeshiva in Heidelberg, Germany. Around 1350 he immigrated to Jerusalem with a group of students and founded a yeshiva. His institution in Jerusalem is mentioned in a Herem document from 1377. Among his students were Samson ben Samuel, author of Kitzur HaMordechai, and Menahem Zioni. Other students of his are mentioned in the above Herem document. Isaac's community received funding from Jewish communities in Europe.

Isaac is the first scholar known to have used the title Asir HaTikvah, literally "The prisoner of hope", a phrase found in Zechariah 9:12.

Isaac's teachings are primarily recorded in the comments of the above student, Rabbi Samson, in his glosses to the Kitzur HaMordechai, found in the National Library of Israel Ms. Heb. 38°6697 as well as in Oxford Ms. Neubauer 784. Many of Isaac's rulings have been published by Rabbi Shlomo Spitzer. Additionally, Isaac is quoted once by Rabbi Yoel Sirkis is his commentary on the Tur.
