= Theodoricus Hackspan =

German theologian

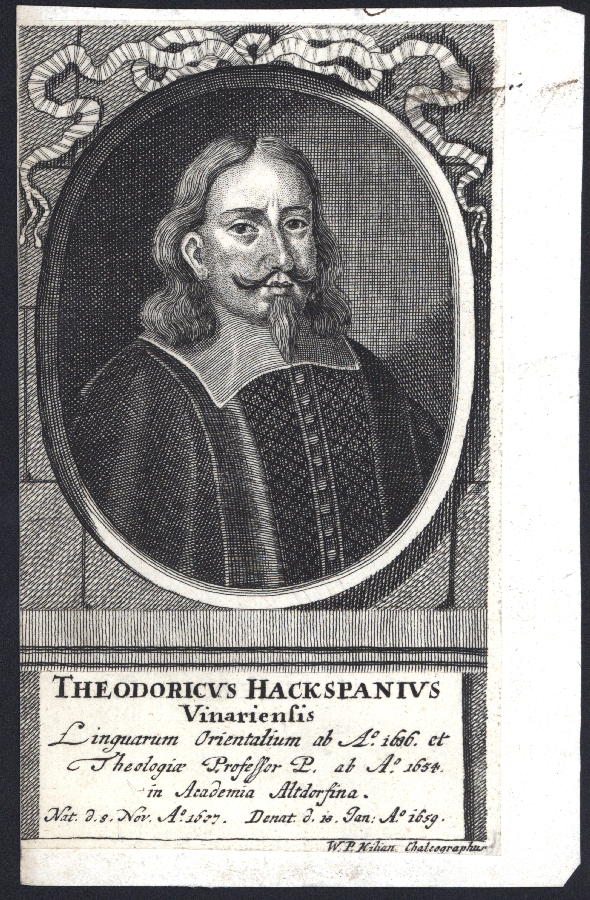
- Theodoricus Hackspan
- Born: 8 November 1607; Weimar, Germany
- Died: 16 January 1659 (aged 51); Altdorf bei Nürnberg
- Occupation: Theologian

Theodoricus Hackspan (8 November 1607 – 16 January 1659) was a German theologian and orientalist.

== Life ==
He was born on 8 November 1607 in Weimar, Germany.

He was the son of a Weimar based real estate inspector.

He died on 16 January 1659 in Altdorf bei Nürnberg, Germany.

== Education ==
He completed his high school education at the Roßleben Gymnasium (German for grammar school).

He began studying philosophy and Oriental languages in 1625 at the University of Jena. He entered the University of Altdorf in 1631. He then went on to study theology at the University of Helmstedt.

He studied theology under the two most well known theologians of 17th century Germany: Daniel Schwenter and Georg Calixtus.

He was fluent in several oriental languages including: Hebrew, Chaldee, Syriac, and Arabic.

== Career ==
He started his career as a professor of the Hebrew language.

In 1654, he was appointed full professor of theology at the University of Altdorf.

He went on to become the dean of the faculty of theology and rector of the University of Altdorf.

== Bibliography ==
He is the author of a number of notable books, written in the Latin language:

- Tractatus de usu Iibrorum Rabbisicorum
- Sylloge Disputationun theologicarum et philololgicarum
- Disputationes de locutionibus sacris (Altdorf, 1648)
- Observationes Arabico-Syriacae in quaedam loca Veteris et Novi Testamenti (ibid. 1639)
- De Angelorum daemonumque noninibus (ibid. 1641): — Fides et Leges Mohhammedis

== See also ==
- Daniel Schwenter
- Georg Calixtus
