= Solomon ben Judah ha-Bavli =

10th-century Jewish liturgist

Solomon ben Judah ha-Bavli was a 10th-century Jewish liturgist.

== Biography ==
In spite of the title "ha-Bavli" ("the Babylonian") given him by Rashi and others, he was not a native of any Muslim country. Rapoport held that the ancient rabbis included Rome under the designation "Babylon"; this being so, Solomon may have been a native of Rome. He is even so termed by M. Sachs in his translation of the Maḥzor (vii. 89), though without any further justification.

Solomon was the teacher of Meshullam ben Kalonymus, and, with Simeon the Great of Mayence and Kalonymus (Meshullam's father), was declared to have been of the generation which preceded Rabbeinu Gershon.

== Works ==
Solomon was the author of numerous piyyutim and selichot, including:

- An "'avodah," commencing "Adderet tilboshet"
- An unrhymed piyyuṭ, arranged in alphabetical order, consisting of combinations of אבגד and תשרק, each letter being repeated from eight to twenty times
- A "yotzer" for the first day of Passover, beginning "Or yesha'" (mentioned by Rashi, Rabbeinu Tam, and many others)
- A yotzer beginning "Omeẓ dar ḥazaḳim," an aggadic cosmogony.

He also wrote several "ofanim" and "zulatot," which are recited on certain Sabbaths.

His selichot are of the kind termed "shalmoniyyot," and consist of four-line strophes, without any Biblical verse.

Many piyyuṭim signed "Solomon" may be Solomon ha-Bavli's.

It has been noticed that in several instances piyyuṭim, or seliḥot, by Solomon ha-Bavli stand side by side with those of Solomon ibn Gabirol. Both bear the signature "Solomon ben Judah," and only upon a close examination can they be assigned to the proper author. Indeed, errors are sometimes made, as in the case of the yotzer "Or yesha'" mentioned above, which is ascribed by a certain commentator to Ibn Gabirol.

It appears that Solomon ha-Bavli was the first to add to his signature words, and sometimes sentences, of an invocative nature, such as "Hazak," or "Yigdal be-Torah."

According to Conforte Solomon was the author of a prayer-book; but Conforte seems to have confused him with Rashi.
