= Menachem Zioni =

Menahem Zioni (Ziyyuni) ben Meir of Speyer (c. 1340 - c. 1410) was a German kabbalist of the middle of the 14th century.

He was the author of the kabbalistic commentary Ẓiyyuni, from which he derives his name. He based his work upon Rashi and Naḥmanides, and especially upon the old kabbalistic literature of the geonic period. The "Ẓiyyuni" is introduced by poems in alphabetic and acrostic order. The division Bereshit begins with a preface on the importance of the assumption of the creation of the world, and in support of this view the arguments of Maimonides are quoted at length. Short poems serve as transitions to the several parashiyyot, and in conclusion there is an acrostic poem, to which, in the second edition, another poem is added.

The verse of Zioni quoted by Leopold Dukes from a manuscript chrestomathy constitutes the last stanza of this final poem. The book is frequently quoted in the Yalḳuṭ Re'ubeni. It was printed by Vincentio Conti at Cremona in 1559, in rabbinic script, and after this edition was burned (in the same year) by marauding Spanish soldiers, it was reprinted there in the following year.

Menahem is not to be identified with Menahem Zion b. Meïr (as does Heidenheim), a payyeṭan of the twelfth century well known under the name of "Menahem b. Machir".
