= Yalqut Reubeni =

The Yalqut Reubeni (Collection of Reuben) is a 17th-century collection of midrashim by Rabbi Reuben Hoschke Kohen first printed at Prague in 1660. The collection includes expansions of Rabbinical legends, including the tales of Jannes and Jambres, and Lilith. Jannes and Jambres are characters from the Book of Exodus. They are the duo of "wise men and sorcerers" who demonstrate similar serpent-themed magic to that of Aaron. They appear frequently in rabbinical literature.
