= Reuben ben Hoshke =

17th century Bohemian rabbi

Reuben Hoshke HaKohen (Sofer) (Hebrew: אברהם ראובן הכהן סופר; died 3 April 1673) was a Kabalist and rabbi of Prague. "Hoshke," his father's name, is a Polish diminutive for "Joshua," mistaken by G.B. De Rossi and Zunz for his family name.

He wrote:

- Yalḳuṭ Re'ubeni, a kabbalistic work (an imitation of the Yalḳuṭ Ḥadash) containing a collection of sayings taken from other kabbalistic works and arranged in alphabetical order (Prague, 1660)
- Yalḳuṭ Re'ubeni ha-Gadol, (ילקוט ראובני הגדול) a kabbalistic midrash on the Pentateuch arranged according to the order of the parashiyyot (Wilmersdorf, 1681)
- Davar Shebi-Ḳedushah, a manual of asceticism and repentance (Sulzbach, 1684)
- Oneg Shabbat, cabalistic reflections on the Sabbath laws, followed by an appendix entitled Derek Ḳabbalat Shabbat (ib. 1684).
