= Rabbinic literature =

Jewish literature attributed to rabbis

Rabbinic literature, in its broadest sense, is the entire corpus of works authored by rabbis throughout Jewish history. The term typically refers to literature from the Talmudic era (70–640 CE), as opposed to medieval and modern rabbinic writings. It aligns with the Hebrew term Sifrut Chazal (Hebrew: ספרות חז״ל), which translates to “literature [of our] sages” and generally pertains only to the sages (Chazal) from the Talmudic period. This more specific sense of "Rabbinic literature"—referring to the Talmud, Midrashim (Hebrew: מדרשים), and related writings, but hardly ever to later texts—is how the term is generally intended when used in contemporary academic writing. The terms mefareshim and parshanim (commentaries and commentators) almost always refer to later, post-Talmudic writers of rabbinic glosses on Biblical and Talmudic texts.

== Mishnaic literature ==
The Midr'she halakha, Mishnah, and Tosefta (compiled from materials pre-dating the year 200 CE) are the earliest extant works of rabbinic literature, expounding and developing Judaism's Oral Law, as well as ethical teachings. Following these came the two Talmuds:

- The Jerusalem Talmud, c. 450 CE
- The Babylonian Talmud, full canonization of all the previous texts c. 600 CE.
- The minor tractates (part of the Babylonian Talmud)

The earliest extant material witness to rabbinic literature of any kind is the Tel Rehov inscription dating to the 6th–7th centuries, also the longest Jewish inscription from late antiquity. Meanwhile, the earliest extant Talmudic manuscripts are from the 8th century.

== The Midrash ==
Midrash (מדרש; pl. Midrashim) is a Hebrew word referring to a method of reading details into or out of a biblical text. The term midrash also can refer to a compilation of Midrashic teachings in the form of legal, exegetical, homiletical, or narrative writing, often configured as a commentary on the Bible or Mishnah. There are a large number of "classical" Midrashic works spanning a period from Mishnaic to Geonic times, often showing evidence of having been worked and reworked from earlier materials and frequently coming to us in multiple variants. A compact list of these works, drawing upon Barry Holtz's Back to the Sources, is given below. The timeline below is approximate because many of the works were composed over a long period, borrowing and collating material from earlier versions; their histories are, therefore, somewhat uncertain and the subject of scholarly debate. In the table, "n.e." designates that the work in question is not extant except in secondary references.

Extra-canonical rabbinical literature ("n.e." designates "not extant")
Estimated date	Exegetical	Homiletical	Narrative
Tannaitic period (till 200 CE)	Mekhilta of Rabbi Ishmael; Mekhilta of Rabbi Shimon; Mekilta le-Sefer Devarim (n.e.); Sifra; Sifre; Sifre Zutta	Alphabet of Akiba ben Joseph (?)	Seder Olam Rabbah
400–650 CE	Genesis Rabbah Midrash Tanhuma; Lamentations Rabbah	Leviticus Rabbah	
650–900 CE	Midrash Proverbs; Ecclesiastes Rabbah	Deuteronomy Rabbah; Pesikta de-Rav Kahana; Pesikta Rabbati; Avot of Rabbi Natan	Pirkei de-Rabbi Eliezer; Seder Olam Zutta; Tanna Devei Eliyahu
900–1000 CE	Midrash Psalms; Exodus Rabbah; Ruth Zuta; Lamentations Zuta		
1000–1200	Midrash Aggadah of Moses ha-Darshan; Midrash Tadshe		
Later	Yalkut Shimoni; Midrash ha-Gadol; Ein Yaakov; Numbers Rabbah		Sefer ha-Yashar

== Later works by category ==
=== Aggada ===
- Alphabet of Rabbi Akiva
- Ein Yaakov
- Legends of the Jews
- Midrash HaGadol
- Midrash Hashkem
- Midrash Rabba
- Midrash Shmuel
- Midrash Tehillim
- Pesikta de-Rav Kahana
- Pesikta Rabbati
- Pirke De-Rabbi Eliezer
- Seder Olam Rabbah
- Seder Olam Zutta
- Sefer HaAggadah
- Sefer haYashar (midrash)
- Smaller midrashim
- Tanhuma
- Tanna Devei Eliyahu
- Tseno Ureno
- Yalkut Shimoni

=== Hasidic thought ===
- Keter Shem Tov
- Tzavaat HaRivash
- Toledot Yaakov Yosef
- Ben Porat Yosef, Tzafnat Paneach, and Ketonet Pasim
- Magid Devarav L'Yaakov
- Or Torah
- Menachem Zion
- Meor Einayim and Yesamach Lev
- Noam Elimelech
- Menorat Zahav
- Avodat Yisrael
- Pri Ha'Aretz and P'ri Ha'Eitz
- Kedushas Levi
- Tiferes Shlomo
- Bet Aharon
- Yosher Divrei Emes
- Tanya (Likutei Amarim)
- Torah Or/Likutei Torah
- Likutei Moharan
- Sippurei Ma'asiyot ("Rabbi Nachman's Stories")
- Sichot HaRan
- Be'er Mayim Hayyim
- Siduro Shel Shabbos
- Avodas HaLevi
- Mei Hashiloach
- Kol Simcha
- Bnei Yissoschar
- Imrei Elimelech and Divrei Elimelech
- Aish Kodesh
- Sefas Emes
- Imrei Emes
- Shem Mishmuel
- Likkutei Sichos
- Nesivos Sholom
- Darchei Noam

=== Hebrew poetry ===
- Biblical poetry
- Medieval Hebrew poetry

=== Jewish liturgy ===
- Piyyut
- Siddur

=== Jewish philosophy ===
- Chovot HaLevavot
- Derech Hashem
- Emunah Ubitachon
- Emunot v'Dayyot
- Kad ha-Kemach
- Kuzari
- Moreh Nevukhim (Guide for the Perplexed)
- Milchamot Hashem (Wars of the Lord)
- Nefesh Ha-Chaim
- Or Adonai
- Perek Chelek
- Philo
- Sefer ha-Ikkarim
- Sefer ha-Chinuch

=== Kabbalah ===
- Etz Chaim
- Maggid Mesharim
- Pardes Rimonim
- Sefer haBahir
- Sefer Raziel HaMalakh
- Sefer Yetzirah
- Tikunei haZohar
- Tomer Devorah
- Zohar

=== Jewish law ===
- Arba'ah Turim
- Aruch HaShulchan
- Beit Yosef
- Ben Ish Hai
- Chayei Adam and Chochmat Adam
- Darkhei Moshe
- Halachot Gedolot
- Kaf HaChaim
- Hilchot HaRif
- Kessef Mishneh
- Kitzur Shulchan Aruch
- Levush Malchut
- Minchat Chinuch
- Mishnah Berurah
- Mishneh Torah
- Responsa literature
- Sefer ha-Chinuch
- Sefer Hamitzvot
- Sefer Mitzvot Gadol
- Shulchan Aruch
- Shulchan Aruch HaRav
- Yalkut Yosef

=== Musar literature ===
- Mesillat Yesharim
- Orchot Tzaddikim
- Sefer Chasidim
- Shaarei Teshuva
- Sefer ha-Yir'ah
- Chovot ha-Levavot
- Ma'alot ha-Middot
- Mishnat R' Aharon
- Mikhtav me-Eliyahu
- Tomer Devorah
- Sichos Mussar
- Pele Yoetz
- Kav ha-Yashar
- Kad HaKemah
- Madreigat Ha'Adam
- Shemonah Perakim

== Later works by historical period ==
=== Works of the Geonim ===
The Geonim are the rabbis of Sura and Pumbeditha in Babylon (650–1250 CE) :

- She'iltoth of Acha'i [Gaon]
- Halachot Gedolot
- Halachot Pesukot, by Rav Yehudai Gaon
- Emunoth ve-Deoth (Saadia Gaon)
- The Siddur by Amram Gaon
- Responsa

=== Works of the Rishonim (the "early" rabbinical commentators) ===
The Rishonim are the rabbis of the early medieval period (1000–1550 CE)

- The commentaries on the Torah, such as those by Rashi, Abraham ibn Ezra, and Nahmanides.
- Commentaries on the Talmud, principally by Rashi, his grandson Samuel ben Meir and Nissim of Gerona.
- Commentaries on the Mishnah, such as those composed by Maimonides, Obadiah of Bertinoro, and Nathan ben Abraham
- Talmudic novellae (chiddushim) by Tosafists, Nahmanides, Nissim of Gerona, Solomon ben Aderet (RaShBA), Yomtov ben Ashbili (Ritva)
- Works of halakha (Asher ben Yechiel, Mordechai ben Hillel)
- Codices by Maimonides and Jacob ben Asher, and finally Shulkhan Arukh
- Responsa, e.g., by Solomon ben Aderet (RaShBA)
- Kabbalistic works (such as the Zohar)
- Philosophical works (Maimonides, Gersonides, Nahmanides)
- Ethical works (Bahya ibn Paquda, Jonah of Gerona)

=== Works of the Acharonim (the "later" rabbinical commentators) ===
The Acharonim are the rabbis from 1550 to the present day.

- Important Torah commentaries include Keli Yakar (Shlomo Ephraim Luntschitz), Ohr ha-Chayim by Chayim ben-Attar, the commentary of Samson Raphael Hirsch, and the commentary of Naftali Zvi Yehuda Berlin.
- Important works of Talmudic novellae include: Pnei Yehoshua, Hafla'ah, Sha'agath Aryei
- Responsa, e.g., by Moses Sofer, Moshe Feinstein
- Works of halakha and codices, e.g., Mishnah Berurah by Yisrael Meir Kagan and the Aruch ha-Shulchan by Yechiel Michel Epstein
- Ethical and philosophical works: Moshe Chaim Luzzatto, Yisrael Meir Kagan and the Mussar Movement
- Hasidic works (Kedushath Levi, Sefath Emmeth, Shem mi-Shemuel)
- Philosophical/metaphysical works (the works of the Maharal of Prague, Moshe Chaim Luzzatto and Nefesh ha-Chayim by Chaim of Volozhin)
- Mystical works
- Historical works, e.g., Shem ha-Gedolim by Chaim Joseph David Azulai.

=== Rabbinic literature after the Holocaust ===
The Holocaust led to the annihilation of substantial numbers of Jewish religious books and manuscripts, as well as the deaths of many rabbinic writers and scholars. In the decades that followed, the reemergence of rabbinic writings and the rescue, editing, and reprinting of pre-Holocaust texts became an essential part of postwar Orthodox Jewish renaissance.

Isaac Hershkowitz and Lea Zanbar identified the reasons why rabbinic scholars engaged in the post-Holocaust literary renaissance. Their findings included that the main reasons behind the literary activity were creating new content and saving and continuing the legacy of the past writings and books, as well as rebuilding the canon. Motives such as commemoration, as well as coping with the personal and collective bereavement, underlay the post-Holocaust literary renaissance in Judaism.

They documented a substantial expansion in Jewish religious book publishing during the postwar decades. According to the bibliographic data they examined, the number of titles published increased from approximately 3,322 in 1945–1954 to 10,124 in 1985–1994, although technological and economic developments also contributed to this growth.

== Mefareshim ==
Mefareshim is a Hebrew word meaning "commentators" (or roughly meaning "exegetes"), Perushim means "commentaries". In Judaism, these words refer to commentaries on the Torah (five books of Moses), Tanakh, Mishnah, Talmud, the responsa literature, or even the siddur (Jewish prayerbook), and more.

=== Classic Torah and Talmud commentaries ===
Classic Torah and/or Talmud commentaries have been written by the following individuals:

- Geonim
  - Saadia Gaon, 10th century Babylon
- Rishonim
  - Rashi (Shlomo Yitzchaki), 12th century France
  - Abraham ibn Ezra
  - Nachmanides (Moshe ben Nahman)
  - Samuel ben Meir, the Rashbam, 12th century France
  - Gersonides, also known as Levi ben Gershom or Ralbag)
  - David Kimhi, the Radak, 13th century France
  - Joseph ben Isaac Bekhor Shor, 12th century France
  - Nissim of Gerona, also known as Nissim ben Reuben Gerondi, or the RaN, 14th century Spain
  - Isaac Abarbanel (1437–1508)
  - Obadiah ben Jacob Sforno, 16th century Italy
- Acharonim
  - The Vilna Gaon, also known as Elijah ben Solomon Zalman, 18th century Lithuania
  - The Malbim, Meir Leibush ben Yehiel Michel Wisser

Classical Talmudic commentaries were written by Rashi. After Rashi, the Tosafot was written, which was an omnibus commentary on the Talmud by the disciples and descendants of Rashi; this commentary was based on discussions done in the rabbinic academies of Germany and France.

=== Modern Torah commentaries ===
Modern Torah commentaries which have received wide acclaim in the Jewish community include:

- Haemek Davar by Rabbi Naftali Zvi Yehuda Berlin
- The Chofetz Chaim
- Torah Temimah of Baruch ha-Levi Epstein
- Kerem HaTzvi, by Rabbi Tzvi Hirsch Ferber
- Sefat Emet (Lips of Truth), Yehudah Aryeh Leib of Ger, 19th century Europe
- The "Pentateuch and Haftaras" by Joseph H. Hertz
- Uebersetzung und Erklärung des Pentateuchs ("Translation and Commentary of the Pentateuch") by Samson Raphael Hirsch
- Nechama Leibowitz, a noted woman scholar
- HaTorah vehaMitzva ("The Torah and the Commandment") by Meïr Leibush, the "Malbim"
- Ha-Ketav veha-Kabbalah by Rabbi Yaakov Tzvi Mecklenburg
- The Soncino Books of the Bible
- Richard Elliot Friedman's Commentary on the Torah (2001)

=== Modern Siddur commentaries ===
Modern Siddur commentaries have been written by:

- Rabbi Yisrael Meir Kagan HaCohen, The Chofetz Chaim's Siddur
- Samson Raphael Hirsch, The Hirsch Siddur, Feldheim
- Abraham Isaac Kook, Olat Reyia
- The Authorised Daily Prayer Book with commentary by Joseph H. Hertz
- Elie Munk, The World of Prayer, Elie Munk
- Nosson Scherman, The Artscroll Siddur, Mesorah Publications
- Jonathan Sacks, in the Authorised Daily Prayer Book of the British Commonwealth (the new version of "Singer's Prayer Book") as well as the Koren Sacks Siddur.
- Reuven Hammer, Or Hadash, a siddur commentary built around the text of Siddur Sim Shalom, United Synagogue of Conservative Judaism
- My Peoples Prayer Book, Jewish Lights Publishing, written by a team of non-Orthodox rabbis and Talmud scholars.

== See also ==
- Jewish commentaries on the Bible
- Judaism § Religious texts
- List of Jewish prayers and blessings
- List of rabbis
- Rabbinic Judaism
- Torah databases (electronic versions of traditional Jewish texts)
- Yeshiva § Curriculum

=== Biblical figures in rabbinic literature ===
- Adam in rabbinic literature
- Daniel in rabbinic literature
- Esther in rabbinic literature
- Ezra in rabbinic literature
- Haman in rabbinic literature
- Jethro in rabbinic literature
- Joab in rabbinic literature
- Job in rabbinic literature
- Moses in rabbinic literature
- Noah in rabbinic literature
- Samson in rabbinic literature
- Simeon in rabbinic literature

== Bibliography ==
- Holtz, Barry W. (2008) [1984]. Back to the Sources: Reading the Classic Jewish Texts. Simon & Schuster. ISBN 9781439126653.
- Introduction to Rabbinic Literature Jacob Neusner, (Anchor Bible Reference Library/Doubleday)
- Introduction to the Talmud and Midrash, H. L. Strack and G. Stemberger, (Fortress Press)
- The Literature of the Sages: Oral Torah, Halakha, Mishnah, Tosefta, Talmud, External Tractates, Shemuel Safrai and Peter J. Tomson (Fortress, 1987)
- Safrai, S. (1976). "The Era of the Mishnah and Talmud (70–640)". In Ben-Sasson, H.H. (ed.). A History of the Jewish People. Translated by Weidenfeld, George. Harvard University Press. pp. 305–382. ISBN 9780674397316.
