= List of people in both the Bible and the Quran =

The Bible and the Quran have many characters in common, many of which are mentioned by name, whereas others are merely referred to. This article is a list of people named or referred to in both the Bible and the Quran.

== Identified by name in the Quran ==
Image	Bible (English)	Quran (Arabic)	Rabbinic (Hebrew)	Notes	Bible Verse	Quaranic Verse
	Aaron	Hārūn/ Haarūn	Aharon		Exodus 7:1	Quran 19:28
	Abraham	Ibrāhīm/ Ebraheem/ Ebraahym/ Ibrāheem	Avraham		Genesis 17:3–5	Quran 2:124
	Adam	Ādam	Adam		Genesis 5:2	Quran 3:59
	Amram	ʿImrān/'Emrān	Amram	Islamic tradition holds both Amram and Joachim are named the same. Although Islamic studies of the beginning of the 20th century tended to note genealogical discrepancies, in more recent Islamic Studies of the 21st century the general consensus is that the Quran does not make a genealogical error but instead makes use of typology. This is supported by the figurative speech of the Quran and the Islamic tradition, as words like "sister" and "daughter" can indicate extended kinship, descendance or spiritual affinity.	Exodus 6:20	Quran 3:33
	King David	Dāwūd/Dā'ūd	Dawid		1 Samuel 17:58	Quran 2:251
	The Apostles	al-Hawariyyūn			Mark 3:16–19	Quran 61:14
	Elijah (Elias)	Ilyās/Elyās	Eliyyahu		2 Kings 1:8	Quran 37:123
	Elisha	al-Yasaʿ	Elishaʿ	Also can be pronounced Alīsaʿ	1 Kings 19:16	Quran 6:86
	Enoch	Idrīs	Chanokh	Idris is not universally identified with Enoch, many Muslim scholars of the classical and medieval periods also held that Idris and Hermes Trismegistus were the same person.	Genesis 5:24	Quran 19:56
	Ezekiel	Ḥizkīl "Dhul-Kifl"	Yechezkel		Ezekiel 1:3	Quran 38:48
	Ezra/Esdras	Uzair or Idris	Ezra		Ezra 7:1	Quran 9:30
	Gabriel	Jibrīl	Gavri'el		Luke 1:19	Quran 2:97
	Gog and Magog	Ya'juj wa-Ma'juj	Gog U-Magog		Ezekiel 38:2	Quran 21:96
	Goliath	Jālūṭ	Golyat		1 Samuel 17:4	Quran 2:251
	Isaac	Isħāq	Yitzhak		Genesis 17:19	Quran 19:49
	Ishmael	Ismāʿīl	Yishmaʿel		Genesis 16:11	Quran 38:48
	Jacob	Yaʿkūb	Yaʿkov		Genesis 32:1	Quran 19:49
	Jethro	Shoʿeib	Yitro		Exodus 3:1	Quran 26:177
	Jesus	ʿĪsā	Yeshua		Matthew 1:16	Quran 3:59
	Joachim or Heli	ʿImrān	Yehoyaqim	Islamic tradition holds both Joachim and Amram are named the same, though the Quran only refers to Joachim with the name of Amram and calls Mary the sister of Aaron, Muslims see this as connecting the two women from two prophetic households in spirit. This question was actually reported to have been put across to Muhammad to which he replied: "The (people of the old age) used to give names (to their persons) after the names of Apostles and pious persons who had gone before them".	Luke 3:23	
	Job	ʾAyyūb	Iyyov		Job 1:1	Quran 6:84
	John the Baptist	Yaḥyā	Yohanan	Yaḥyā means 'living' as opposed to Yūḥānna ('graceful'), which comes from Hebrew Yoḥanan.	Luke 1:13	Quran 19:7
	Jonah	Yūnas/ Yūnes/ Yūnus/ Yūnis "Dhun-Nun"	Yonah	Possibly derived from Greek Ionas	Jonah 3:4	Quran 37:139
	Joseph	Yūsif	Yosef		Genesis 30:24	Quran 6:84
	Lot	Lūṭ	Lot		Genesis 11:27	Quran 66:10
	Lot's wife	Lūṭ's wife		She is nameless both in the Bible and in the Quran.	Genesis 19:26	Quran 26:170
	Mary	Maryam	Mariam		Matthew 1:16	Quran 19:34
	Miriam	Mūsā's sister	Miriam		Exodus 6:20	Quran 28:11
	Michael	Mīkāīl	Mikhael		Revelation 12:7	Quran 02:98
	Moses	Mūsā	Moshe		Exodus 6:20	Quran 33:7
	Noah	Nūḥ	Nōaḥ		Genesis 5:29	Quran 33:7
	Pharaoh	Firʿawn	Paroh		Exodus 1:11	Quran 20:60
	Queen of Sheba	Queen of Sabaʾ; Bilqīs	Malkat Saba	She is nameless both in the Bible and in the Quran, but the name Bilqīs or Balqīs comes from Islamic tradition.	1 Kings 10:1	Quran 27:29
	Saul the King	Ṭālūt	Sha'ul	Literally 'Tall'; Meant to rhyme with Lūṭ or Jālūṭ.	1 Samuel 17:33	Quran 2:247
	Devil or Satan	Shaitān / Iblīs	HaSatan	Iblīs, literally 'despaired'; Possibly derived from Greek Diabolus.	Genesis 3:14	Quran 7:11
	Solomon	Sulaymān	Shlomoh		1 Kings 10:23	Quran 34:12
	Zechariah	Zakariyyā	Zekaryah		Luke 1:13	Quran 19:7
	Zimri (prince)	As-Samiriyy	Zimri ben Salu	Al-Samīri is arguably derived from Eastern Syriac 'Zamri, which is derived from Hebrew Zimri.	Numbers 25:14	Quran 20:85

== Not identified by name in the Quran ==
Sarah, Hagar, Zipporah, Elizabeth, Raphael, Cain and Abel, Korah, Joseph's brothers, Potiphar and his wife, Eve, Jochebed, Samuel, Noah's sons, and Noah's wife are mentioned, but unnamed in the Quran.

In Islamic tradition, these people are given the following names:

Image	Bible (English)	Arabic	Notes
	Abel	Habil	
	Benjamin	Binyamīn	
	Cain	Qabil	
	Canaan	Kan'an	It is not clear if Canaan and Kan'an are the same person, as he is Nuh's son rather than his grandson.
	Elizabeth	ʾIlīṣābāt or Elīsābāt	
	Eve	Hawah	
	Hagar	Hajar	
	Ham	Ham	
	Japheth	Yafes	
	Jochebed	Yūkābid	
	Joshua	Yusha-bin-Noon	
	Korah	Qārūn	
	Potiphar	Azeez	
	Raphael	Isrāfīl	
	Samuel	Samu'il	
	Sarah	Sara	
	Shem	Sam	

== See also ==
- Biblical and Quranic narratives
- Table of prophets of Abrahamic religions
- Biblical names and their Arabic equivalent

== Bibliography ==
- Wheeler, Brannon (2006). "Dhu Al-Qarnayn". In Leaman, Oliver (ed.). The Qur'an: An Encyclopedia. Taylor & Francis. ISBN 9780415326391.
