= Abraham Caceres =

Portuguese-Dutch composer

- Died: c. 1740
- Occupation: Composer

Abraham de Caceres or Casseres (fl. 1718 – c. 1740) was a Dutch Jewish composer of the late baroque period.

Caceres is primarily known as the composer-in-residence to the Amsterdam Sephardic community between 1720 and 1740. He preceded the Gentile Christian Joseph Lidarti who was commissioned to compose Esther in Hebrew.

He set to music the poems of Moses Hayyim Luzzatto. He also composed two melodies found in the Kabbalistic work Hon Ashir which was authored in 1730–31 by Rabbi Immanuel Hai Ricchi.

== Works and editions ==
Some of his works are preserved in the Ets Haim Library.

== Discography ==
- מוסיקה לבית הכנסת בתקופת הברוק/Synagogal music in the Baroque: Italy, Amsterdam, southern France (= Anthology of music traditions in Israel) (Jerusalem: מרכז לחקר המוסיקה היהודית, האוניברסיטה העברית בירושלים/Jewish Music Research Centre, the Hebrew University of Jerusalem, 1991. Jewish Music Research Centre AMTI CD 9101) includes two works by Caceres performed by The Cameran Singers and an ad hoc instrumental ensemble, conducted by Avner Itai: Ḥishḳi ḥizḳi (or as Hishqî hizqî ), and Hamasiaḥ ilemim (as ha-Mesiaḥ ilmim or Ham-mesîah illemîm).
- מוסיקה לבית הכנסת בתקופת הבארוק. יונה בין חגוי סלע /Synagogal music in the Baroque: Dove in the clefts of the rock (= Anthology of music traditions in Israel 8) ([Yerushalayim]: האוניברסיטה העברית בירושלים, המרכז לחקר המוסיקה היהודית/ha-Universiṭah ha-ʻIvrit bi-Yerushalayim, ha-Merkaz le-ḥeḳer ha-musiḳah ha-Yehudit, 1994) includes two works by Caceres performed possibly by various soloists, an ad hoc instrumental ensemble, The Israel National Choir Rinat, and The Keshet Baroque Orchestra, conducted by Avner Itai: Ḥishḳi ḥizḳi (Ḥishqi ḥizqi), and Le-El elim.
- Music of European Jews, 1550-1800 ([Grinnell, Iowa?]: [Grinnell Collegium?], [2003]) includes two works by Caceres performed by Grinnell Collegium, conducted by Oleg Timofeyev: Le-El elim (as Le-el elim), and Ḥishḳi ḥizḳi (as Hishki hizki).
- Jewish baroque music (Musicmedia, ©2008. Concerto CD 2009. EAN 8012665200918. UPC 898428002221) includes three works by Caceres performed by Ensemble Salomone Rossi: Ḥishḳi ḥizḳi (as Hiski Hizki), Hamesiaḥ ilemim (as Hamesiah), and Le-El elim (as Le El Elim).
- Musiques juives baroques: Venise, Mantoue, Amsterdam (1623-1774): hommage à Israel Adler (= Collection Patrimoines musicaux des juifs de France 10) (Paris, France: Fondation du Judaïsme Français, [2011]. Buda Musique 860212. EAN 3341348602127) includes two works by Caceres performed by Ensemble Texto, conducted by David Klein: Le-El elim (as Le’el elim), and Ḥishḳi ḥizḳi (as Ḥishki ḥizki).
