= Bar and bat mitzvah =

Jewish coming of age rituals

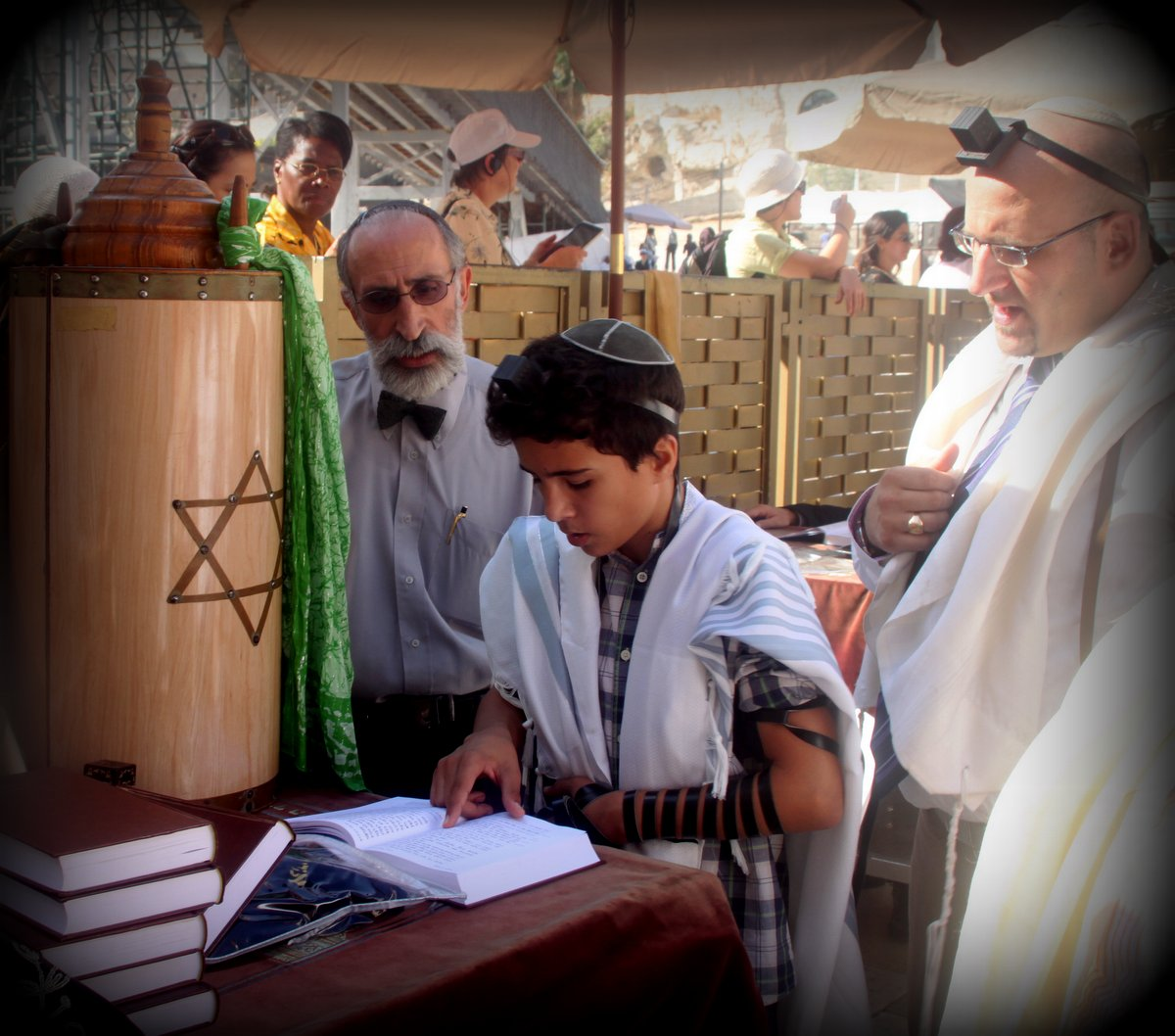
- Bar mitzvah boy wearing tallit and tefillin
- Native name: Bar mītsvā: בַּר מִצְוָה; Bat mītsvā: בַּת מִצְוָה
- Time: Orthodox boys: 13 years old, girls: 12 years old; Reform and Conservative boys and girls: 12 or 13 years old
- Type: Coming-of-age ceremony
- Theme: Reaching the age of bar or bat mitzvah signifies becoming a full-fledged member of the Jewish community

A bar mitzvah (masculine) or bat mitzvah (feminine) (Note: Bar and bat meaning 'son of' and 'daughter of' respectively; mitzvah meaning 'commandment' or 'law'. The plural of bar mitzvah (Hebrew: בַּר מִצְוָה), used for both all-male and mixed-gender groups, is b'nai mitzvah, also transliterated b'nei mitzvah (בְּנֵי מִצְוָה). The plural of bat mitzvah (בַּת מִצְוָה; Ashkenazi pronunciation: bas mitzveh) is b'not mitzvah (בְּנוֹת מִצְוָה; Ashkenazi pronunciation: b'nos mitzvah). In English, b'nai mitzvah is also sometimes used in the singular as a gender-neutral term, including for nonbinary youth; other gender-neutral terms include simchat ('celebration of') mitzvah, kabbalat ('reception of') mitzvah, b'mitzvah (also bamitzvah or b-mitzvah, all meaning 'in' or 'subject to' mitzvah), and brit ('covenant of') mitzvah.) is a coming of age ritual in Judaism. According to Jewish law, before children reach a certain age, the parents are responsible for their child's actions. Once Jewish children reach that age, they are said to "become" b'nai mitzvah, at which point they begin to be held accountable for their own actions. Traditionally, the father of a bar or bat mitzvah offers thanks to God that he is no longer punished for his child's sins.

In Orthodox communities, boys become bar mitzvah at 13 and girls become bat mitzvah at 12. In most Reform, Reconstructionist, and Conservative communities, the milestone is 13 regardless of gender. After this point, children are also held responsible for knowing Jewish ritual law, tradition, and ethics, and are able to participate in all areas of Jewish community life to the same extent as adults. In some Jewish communities, men's and women's roles differ in certain respects. For example, in Orthodox Judaism, once a boy turns 13, it is permitted to count him for the purpose of determining whether there is a prayer quorum, and he may lead prayer and other religious services in the family and the community.

Bar mitzvah is mentioned in the Mishnah and the Talmud. Some classic sources identify the age at which children must begin to participate in the ritual at the age of 13 for boys and 12 for girls. The age of b'nai mitzvah roughly coincides with the onset of puberty. The bar/bat mitzvah ceremony is usually held on the first Shabbat after the birthday on which the child reaches the eligible age.

== Etymology ==
Bar (בַּר) is a Jewish Babylonian Aramaic word meaning 'son' (בֵּן, ben in Hebrew), while bat (בַּת), in Hebrew, means 'daughter'. Mitzvah (מִצְוָה) is Hebrew for 'commandment' or 'law'. Thus, bar mitzvah and bat mitzvah literally translate to 'son of commandment' and 'daughter of commandment', respectively. However, in rabbinical usage, the word bar means 'under the category of' or 'subject to'. Bar mitzvah therefore translates to '[one] who is subject to the law'. Although the term is commonly used to refer to the ritual itself, the phrase originally refers to the person.

== History ==
The modern method of celebrating becoming a bar mitzvah did not exist in the time of the Hebrew Bible, Mishnah, or Talmud. Early rabbinic sources specify 13 as the age at which a boy becomes a legal adult; however, the celebration of this occasion is not mentioned until the Middle Ages (from approximately 500 CE to 1500 CE; see post-classical history).

Some late midrashic sources, and some medieval sources refer to a synagogue ceremony performed upon the boy's reaching age thirteen:

- Simon Tzemach Duran quotes a Midrash interpreting the Hebrew word zo ("this") in Isaiah 43:21 ("These people have I formed for myself, they shall speak my praise") as referring by its numerical value to those that have reached the age of 13. This seems to imply that, at the time of the composition of the Midrash the bar mitzvah publicly pronounced a blessing on the occasion of his entrance upon maturity.
- The Midrash Hashkem: "The heathen when he begets a son consecrates him to idolatrous practices; the Israelite has his son circumcised and the rite of 'pidyon haben' performed; and as soon as he becomes of age he brings him into the synagogue and school in order that he may praise the name of God, reciting the Barechu."
- Masseket Soferim (18:5) makes matters even more explicit: "In Jerusalem they are accustomed to initiate their children to fast on the Day of Atonement, a year or two before their maturity; and then, when the age has arrived, to bring the Bar Mitzvah before the priest or elder for blessing, encouragement, and prayer, that he may be granted a portion in the Law and in the doing of good works. Whosoever is of superiority in the town is expected to pray for him as he bows down to him to receive his blessing."
- Genesis Rabbah: "Up to 13 years Esau and Jacob went together to the primary school and back home; after the thirteen years were over, the one went to the beit midrash to study Law, the other to the house of idols. Regarding this, Rabbi Eleazar remarks, 'Until the 13th year it is the father's duty to train his boy; after this, he must say: "Blessed be He who has taken from me the responsibility [the punishment] for this boy!"'"

Later on are references to a festive celebration on this occasion:

- "It is a mitzvah for a person to make a meal on the day his son becomes Bar Mitzvah as on the day he enters the wedding canopy."

=== Age thirteen ===
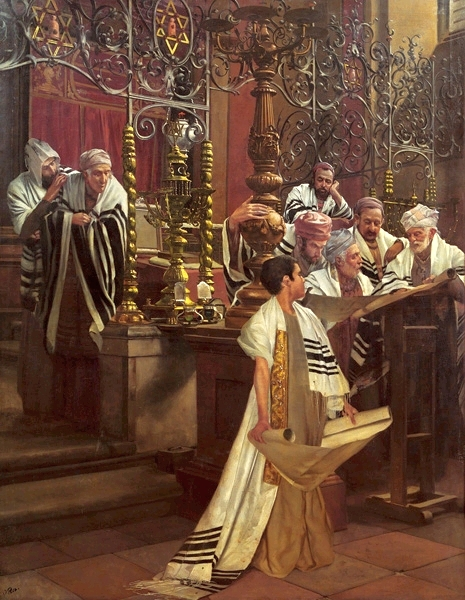
Bar Mitzvah in a Synagogue by Oscar Rex

The Bible does not explicitly specify the age of 13. Passages in the books of Exodus and Numbers note the age of majority for army service as twenty. Machzor Vitri notes that Genesis 34:25 refers to Levi as a "man", when a calculation from other verses suggests that Levi was aged 13 at the time.

The age of thirteen is mentioned in the Mishnah as the time one is obligated to observe the Torah's commandments: "At five years old one should study the Scriptures, at ten years for the Mishnah, at 13 for the commandments..."

Elsewhere, the Mishnah lists the ages (13 for boys and 12 for girls) at which a vow is considered automatically valid; the Talmud explains this as a result of the 13-year-old being a "man", as required in Numbers 6:2. (For one year before this age, the vows are conditionally valid, depending on whether the boy or girl has signs of physical maturity.)

Other sources also list thirteen as the age of majority with respect to following the commandments of the Torah, including:

- "Why is the evil inclination personified as the great king (Ecclesiastes 9:14)? Because it is thirteen years older than the good inclination." That is to say, one's good inclination begins to act upon reaching the age of majority.
- According to Pirke Rabbi Eli'ezer 26, Abraham rejected the total idolatry of his father and became a worshiper of God when he was thirteen years old.

=== The term "bar mitzvah" ===
The term "bar mitzvah" appears first in the Talmud, meaning "one who is subject to the law", though it does not refer to age. The term "bar mitzvah", in reference to age, cannot be clearly traced earlier than the 14th century, the older rabbinical term being "gadol" (adult) or "bar 'onshin" (one legally responsible for own misdoings).

== Significance ==
Reaching the age of bar or bat mitzvah signifies becoming a full-fledged member of the Jewish community with the responsibilities that come with it. These include moral responsibility for one's own actions; eligibility to be called to read from the Torah and lead or participate in a minyan; the right to possess personal property and to legally marry on one's own according to Jewish law; the duty to follow the 613 laws of the Torah and keep the halakha; and the capacity to testify as a witness in a beth din (rabbinical court) case.

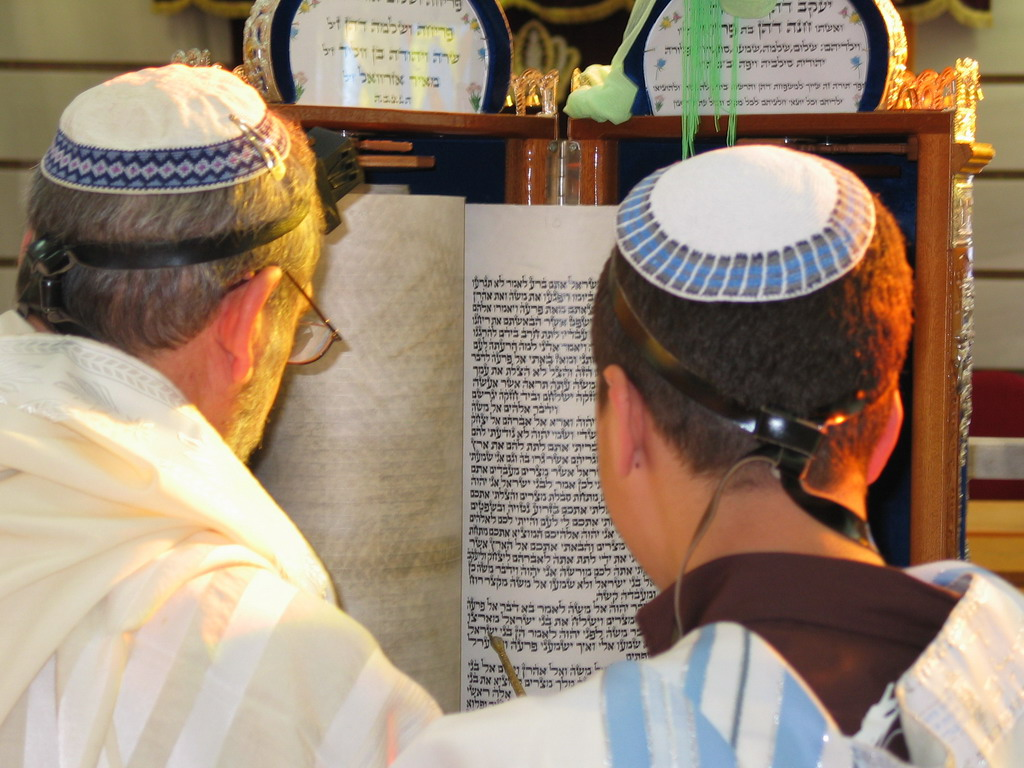
Reading from the Torah (Sephardi custom)

Many congregations require pre-bar mitzvah children to attend a minimum number of Shabbat prayer services at the synagogue, study at a Hebrew school, take on a charity or community service project and maintain membership in good standing with the synagogue. In addition to study and preparation offered through the synagogue and Hebrew schools, bar mitzvah tutors may be hired to prepare the child through the study of Hebrew, Torah cantillation and basic Jewish concepts.

According to Rabbi Mark Washofsky, "The Reform Movement in North America has struggled over the bar/bat mitzvah. At one time, this ceremony was on the verge of extinction in Reform congregations. Most of them preferred to replace bar/bat mitzvah with confirmation, which they considered a more enlightened and appropriate ceremony for modern Jews. Yet the enduring popularity of bar/bat mitzvah prevailed and today, in our communities, bar/bat mitzvah is 'virtually universally observed' by Reform Jews."

In 2012, concern about the high post-bar/bat mitzvah drop-out rate led the Union for Reform Judaism to launch the B'nai Mitzvah Revolution, an effort to shift Reform congregations away from "the long-held assumption that religious school is about preparing kids for their bar/bat mitzvah" and focus instead on teaching them how to become committed and involved members of the Jewish community.

== Aliyah to the Torah ==
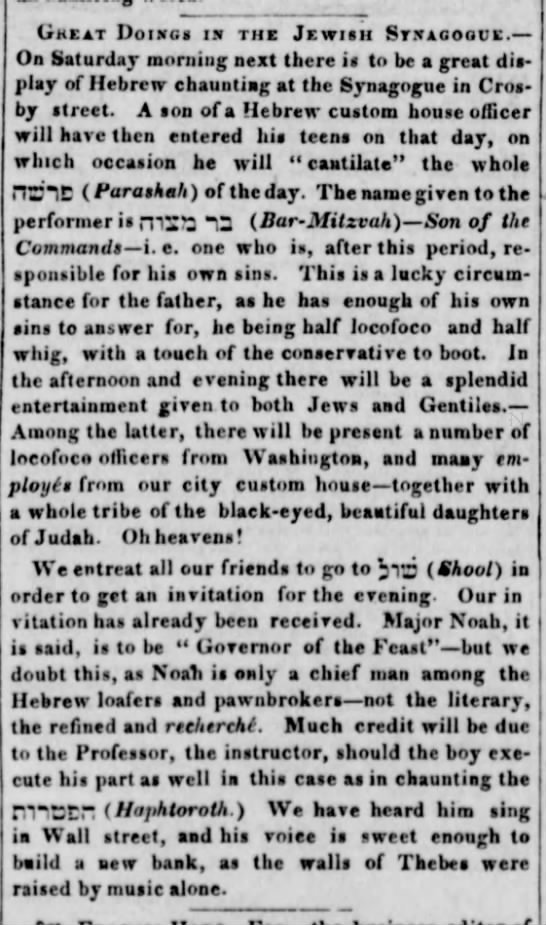
An 1839 description of an upcoming Manhattan bar mitzvah reported in the New York Herald

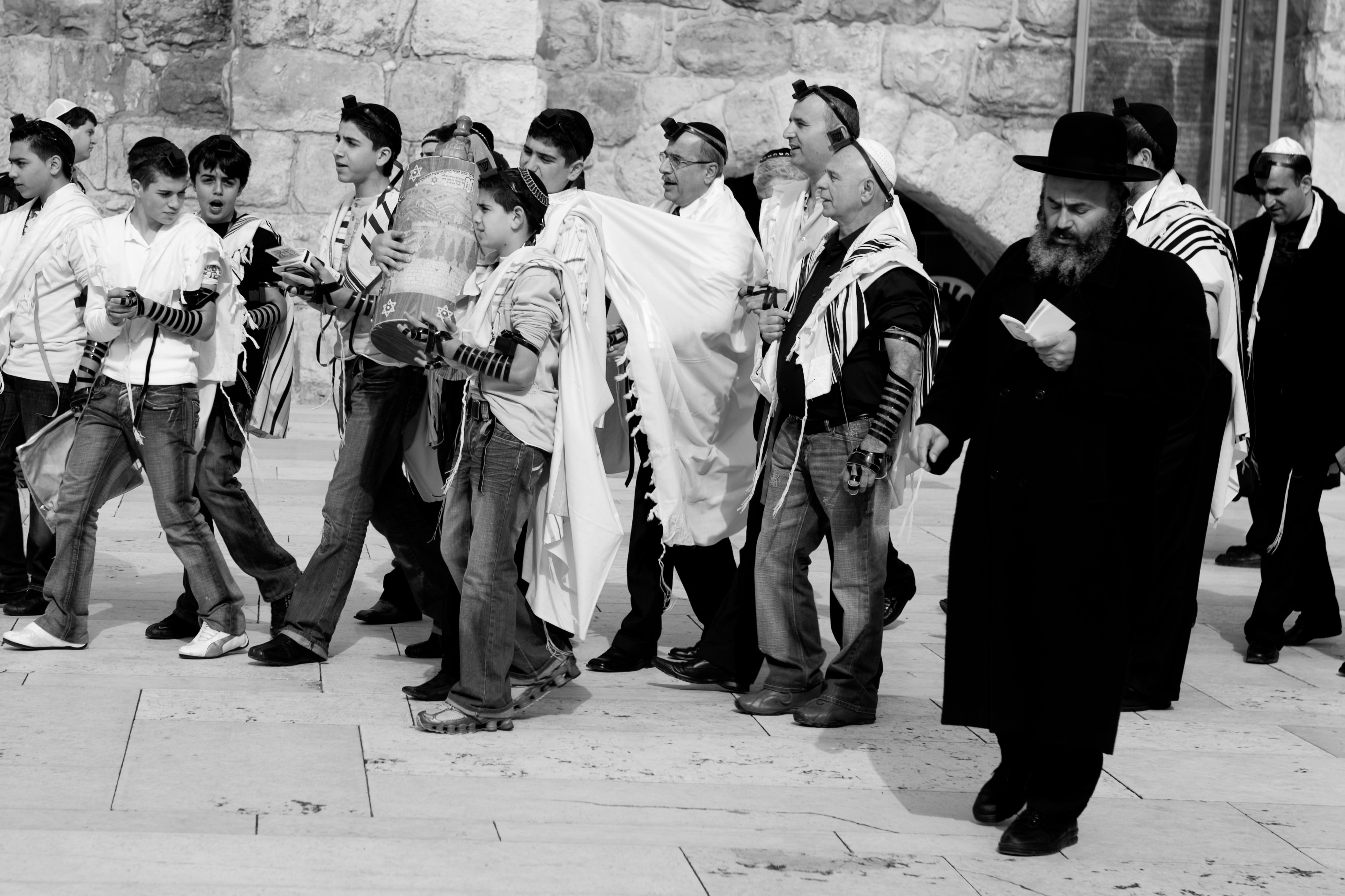
Bar mitzvah at the Western Wall in Jerusalem

The widespread practice is that shortly after a boy turns 13, they are called up for an aliyah, the ceremony of reading a portion of the Torah section of the day.

On the Sabbath, there are seven main sections, plus an eighth, known as maftir, which is also connected to the reading of that day's haftorah section. It is most common to give the child the maftir reading.

In most synagogues, a designated officiant, the ba'al korei, reads all of the Torah portions, and the people receiving each aliyah only say the blessings before and after their portion is read. A bar mitzvah boy may learn to act as the ba'al korei, either for the entire service, for just his aliyah, or any range in-between. He may also be ba'al korei for the haftorah portion if he receives the maftir, or may only be ba'al korei for the haftorah, without reading from the Torah at all. Any of these undertakings involves a steep learning curve and much practice, possibly taking a year of study, and is an impressive accomplishment.

Girls may have an aliyah in Reform, Reconstructionist, and Conservative Jewish synagogues. In Orthodox synagogues, aliyot were and typically still are restricted to boys, with a girl potentially giving a d'var Torah at the end of the service. Some Modern Orthodox girls give aliyot at women's services, with fewer than ten men (so as not to constitute a minyan).

In Orthodox circles, the occasion is sometimes celebrated during a weekday service that includes reading from the Torah, such as a Monday or Thursday morning service.

Some communities or families may delay the celebration for reasons such as availability of a Shabbat during which no other celebration has been scheduled, or to allow family members to travel to the event. However, this does not delay the onset of rights and responsibilities of being a Jewish adult which comes about strictly by virtue of age.

== Tefillin ==
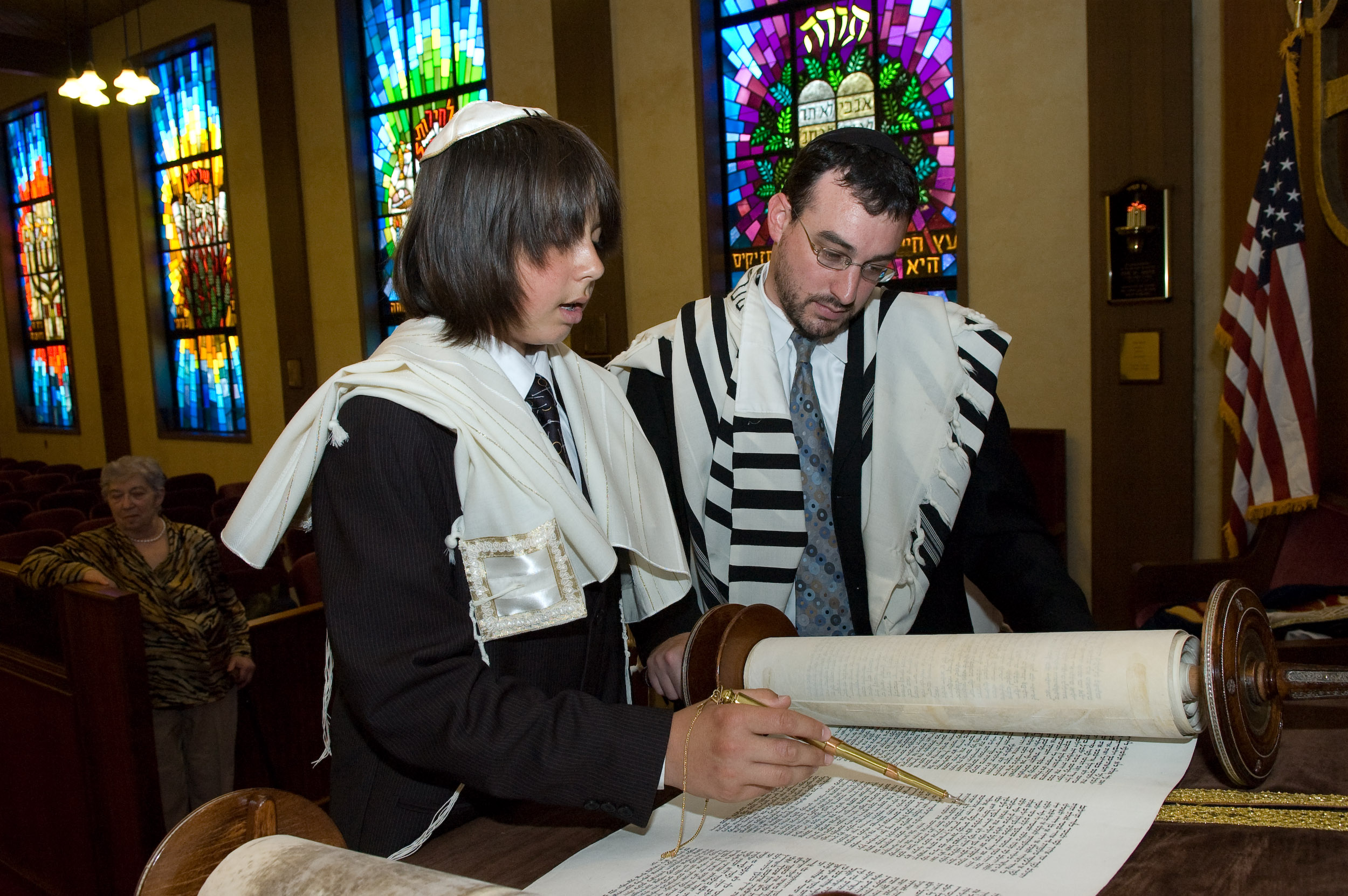
Bar mitzvah ceremony at a Reform synagogue

The obligation to lay tefillin begins when a boy reaches bar mitzvah age. The common custom is for the bar mitzvah boy to begin putting on tefillin one to three months before his bar mitzvah. This way, by the time he is obligated in the commandment, he will already know how to fulfill it properly.

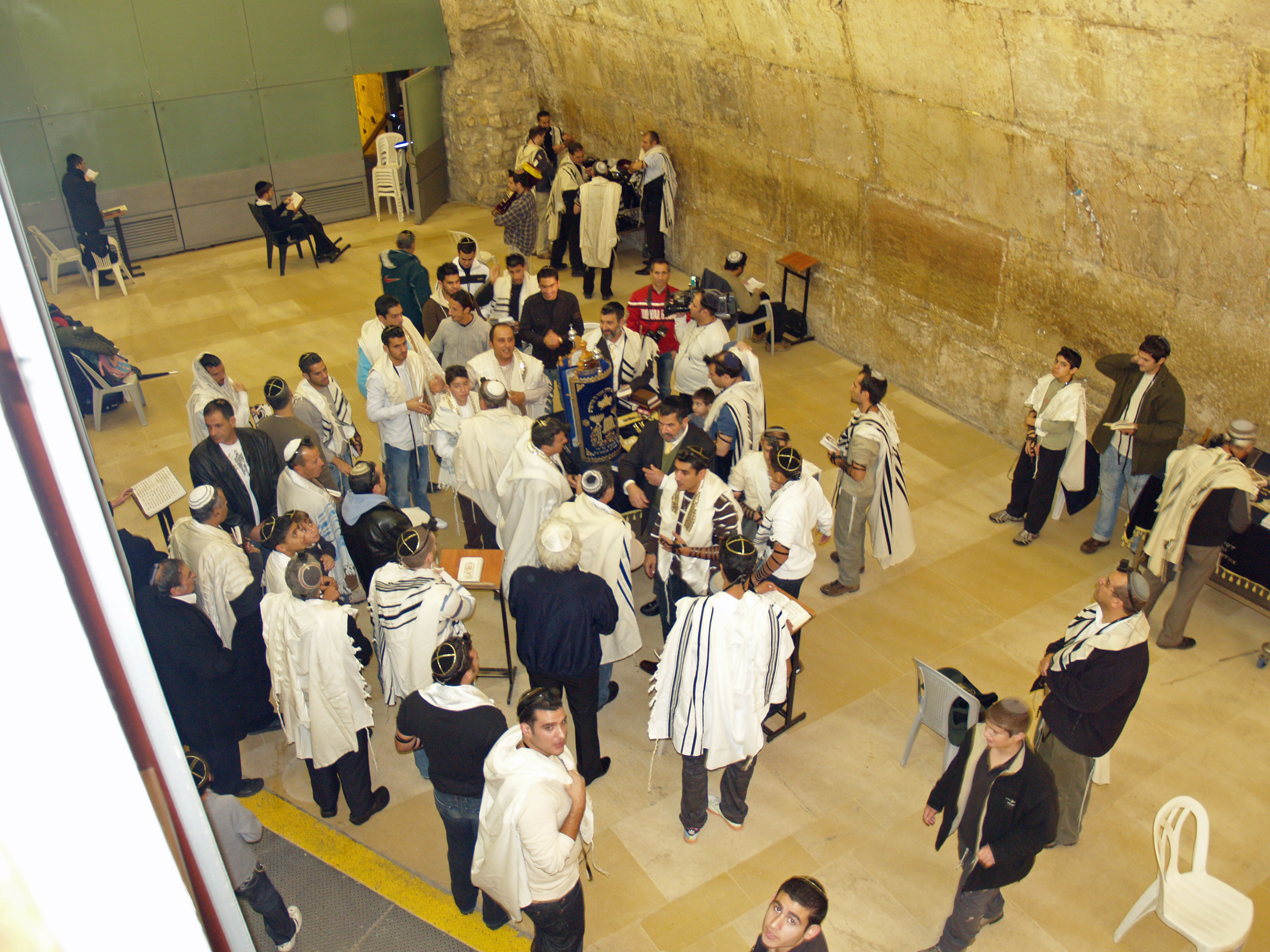
Bar mitzvah at the Western Wall in Jerusalem

== Parties ==
As the first mention of a party associated with a synagogue bar mitzvah was in the 13th century, hosting some sort of party is traditional and frequently considered necessary.

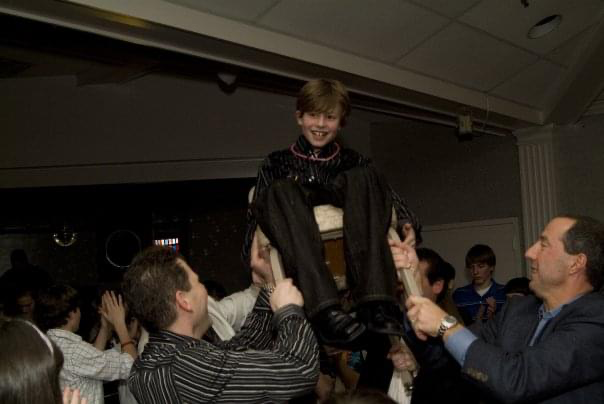
A boy at his bar mitzvah participating in the traditional hora dance

Bar mitzvah festivities typically include a joyous seudat mitzvah, a celebratory meal with family, friends, and members of the community, the bar mitzvah boy delivering on this occasion a learned discourse or oration at the table before the invited guests, who offer him presents, while the rabbi or teacher gives him his blessing, accompanying it at times with an address. Some Jews celebrate in other ways such as taking the bat or bar mitzvah on a special trip or organizing some special event in the celebrant's honour. In many communities, the celebrant is given a certificate.

In some times and places, local Jewish leaders have officially limited the size and elaborateness of mitzvahs. For example, only ten men were permitted to attend the party in 1730 in Berlin, and music was banned at these parties in 1767 in Prague. These rules were usually meant to avoid offending non-Jewish neighbours, and to maintain the rule that it be a smaller celebration than a wedding.

Bar and bat mitzvah parties among wealthy Jewish families in North America are often lavish affairs held at hotels and country clubs with hundreds of guests. The trend has been mocked, most notably in the movie Keeping Up with the Steins. These lavish parties were also heavily featured in the film You Are So Not Invited to My Bat Mitzvah. In the 1950s, Rabbi Harold Saperstein of New York described them as too often being "more bar than mitzvah". Rabbi Shmuley Boteach says that over-the-top bar mitzvah parties were already common when he was growing up in Miami in the 1970s.

In 1979, the Responsa Committee of the Central Conference of American Rabbis addressed the Reform attitude toward bat/bar mitzvah: "Every effort should be exerted to maintain the family festivities in the religious mood at the bar/bat mitzvah. Some of the efforts of early Reform in favor of confirmation [and] against bar mitzvah were prompted by the extravagant celebration of bar mitzvah, which had removed its primary religious significance. We vigorously oppose such excesses, as they destroy the meaning of bar/bat mitzvah."

In May 1992, the board of trustees of the Union of American Hebrew Congregations (now the Union for Reform Judaism), the synagogue arm of the Reform Movement, unanimously passed a resolution decrying "excesses of wasteful consumption...glitzy theme events, sophisticated entertainment...and expensive party favors", calling instead for "family cohesion, authentic friendship, acts of tzedakah (righteous giving), and parties suitable for children."

The cost of the party depends upon what the family is willing and able to spend. Some families spend tens, or even hundreds, of thousands of dollars on the party. Generally speaking, these celebrations are less costly and elaborate than a wedding in that family. In addition to food and drink for the guests, the money at an elaborate party is mostly spent on renting and decorating a venue and hiring staff, from the catering team to emcees, DJs, entertainers, and dancers (also called "motivators") to encourage the guests to dance or play games.

== Bat mitzvah customs ==
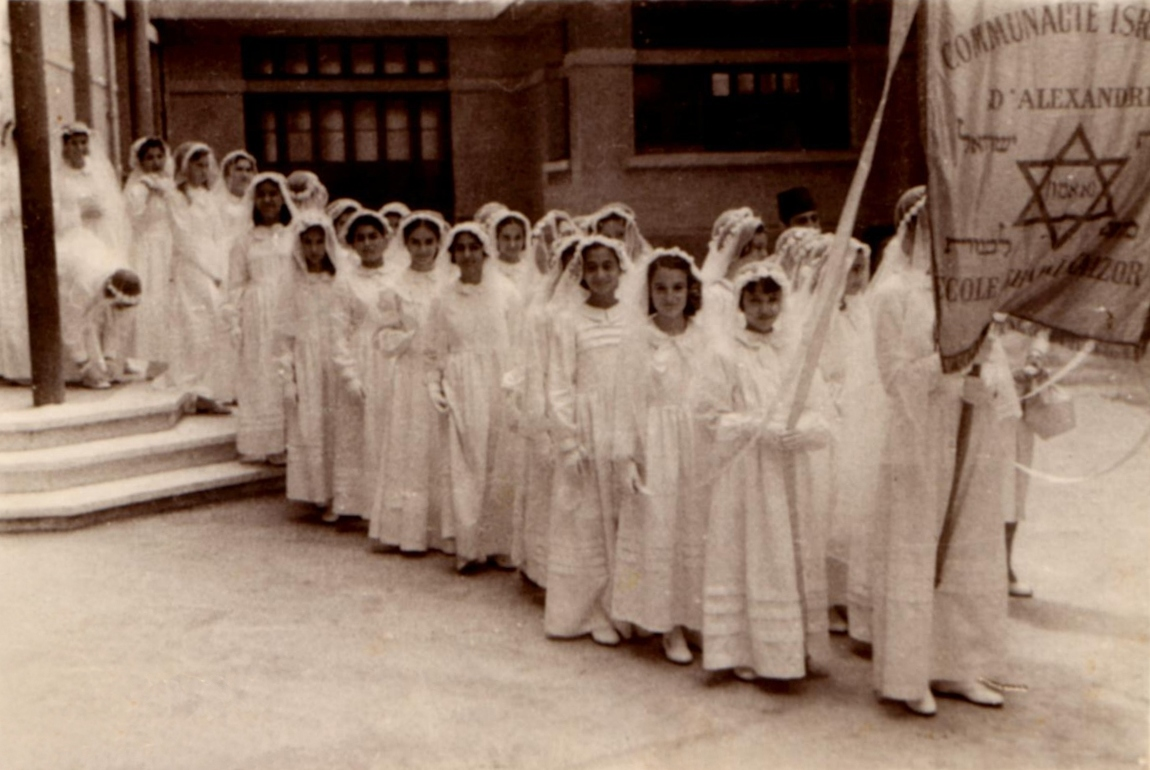
Egyptian Alexandria Jewish girls during bat mitzvah

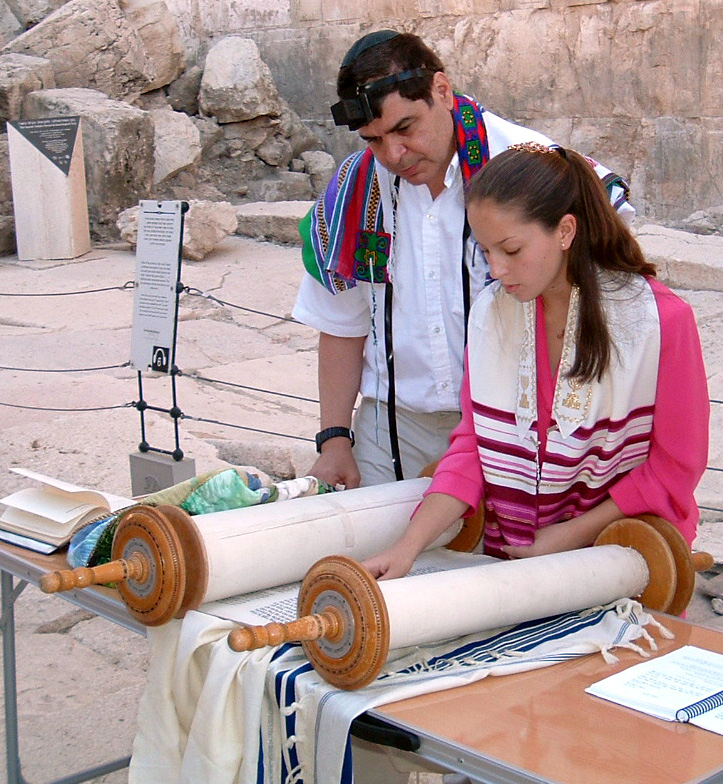
A Conservative bat mitzvah in Israel

Today many non-Orthodox Jews celebrate a girl's bat mitzvah at age 13 in the same way as a boy's bar mitzvah. All Reform and Reconstructionist, and most Conservative synagogues have egalitarian participation, in which women read from the Torah and lead services. In Orthodox communities, a bat mitzvah is celebrated when a girl reaches the age of 12.

The majority of Orthodox and some Conservative Jews reject the idea that a woman can publicly read from the Torah or lead prayer services whenever there is a minyan (quorum of 10 males) available to do so. However, the public celebration of a girl becoming bat mitzvah in other ways has made strong inroads into Modern Orthodox Judaism and also into some elements of Haredi Judaism. In these congregations, women do not read from the Torah or lead prayer services, but they occasionally lecture on a Jewish topic to mark their coming of age, learn a book of Tanakh, recite verses from the Book of Esther or the Book of Psalms, or say prayers from the siddur. In some Modern Orthodox circles, bat mitzvah girls will read from the Torah and lead prayer services in a women's tefillah. Rabbi Moshe Feinstein, a prominent Orthodox posek, described the bat mitzvah celebration as "meaningless", and of no greater halakhic significance than a birthday party. However, he reluctantly permitted it in homes, but not synagogues, as the latter would be construed as imitating Reform and Conservative customs; in any case, they do not have the status of seudat mitzvah. Rabbi Ovadiah Yosef held that it is a seudat mitzvah.

There were occasional attempts to recognize a girl's coming of age in eastern Europe in the 19th and 20th centuries, the former in Warsaw (1843) and the latter in Lemberg (1902). The occasion was marked by a party without any ritual in the synagogue.

There are documents that record an Italian rite for becoming bat mitzvah, known as an "entrance into the minyan" ceremony, in which boys of thirteen and girls of twelve recited a blessing, since the mid-19th century. There were also some bat mitzvah rituals held in the 19th century in Iraq. However, it was the American rabbi Mordecai M. Kaplan held the first public celebration of a bat mitzvah as we understand it in modern times for his daughter on March 18, 1922, at the Society for the Advancement of Judaism, his synagogue in New York City. Kaplan was unaware of the earlier Italian precedent and learned of them several months later, while on holiday in Italy. Judith Kaplan recited the preliminary blessing, read a portion of that week's Torah portion in Hebrew and English, and then intoned the closing blessing. Mordecai Kaplan, an Orthodox rabbi who joined Conservative Judaism and then became the founder of Reconstructionist Judaism, influenced Jews from all branches of non-Orthodox Judaism, through his position at the Jewish Theological Seminary of America. At the time, most Orthodox rabbis strongly rejected the idea of a bat mitzvah ceremony.

As the ceremony became accepted for females as well as males, many women chose to celebrate the ceremony even though they were much older, as a way of formalizing and celebrating their place in the adult Jewish community.

== Alternative ceremonies ==
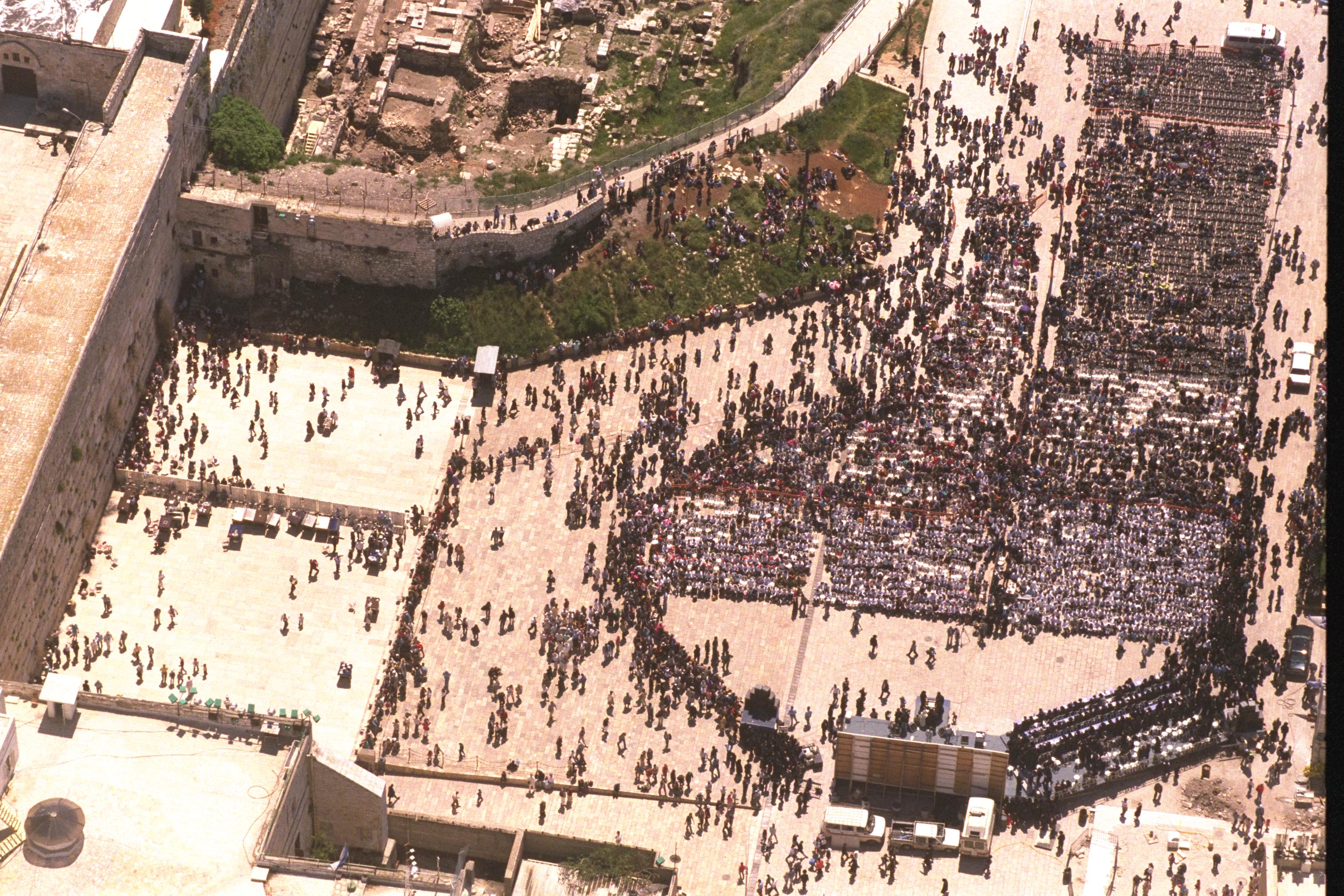
Bar mitzvah for 1,000 immigrant boys from Russia at the Western Wall, 1995

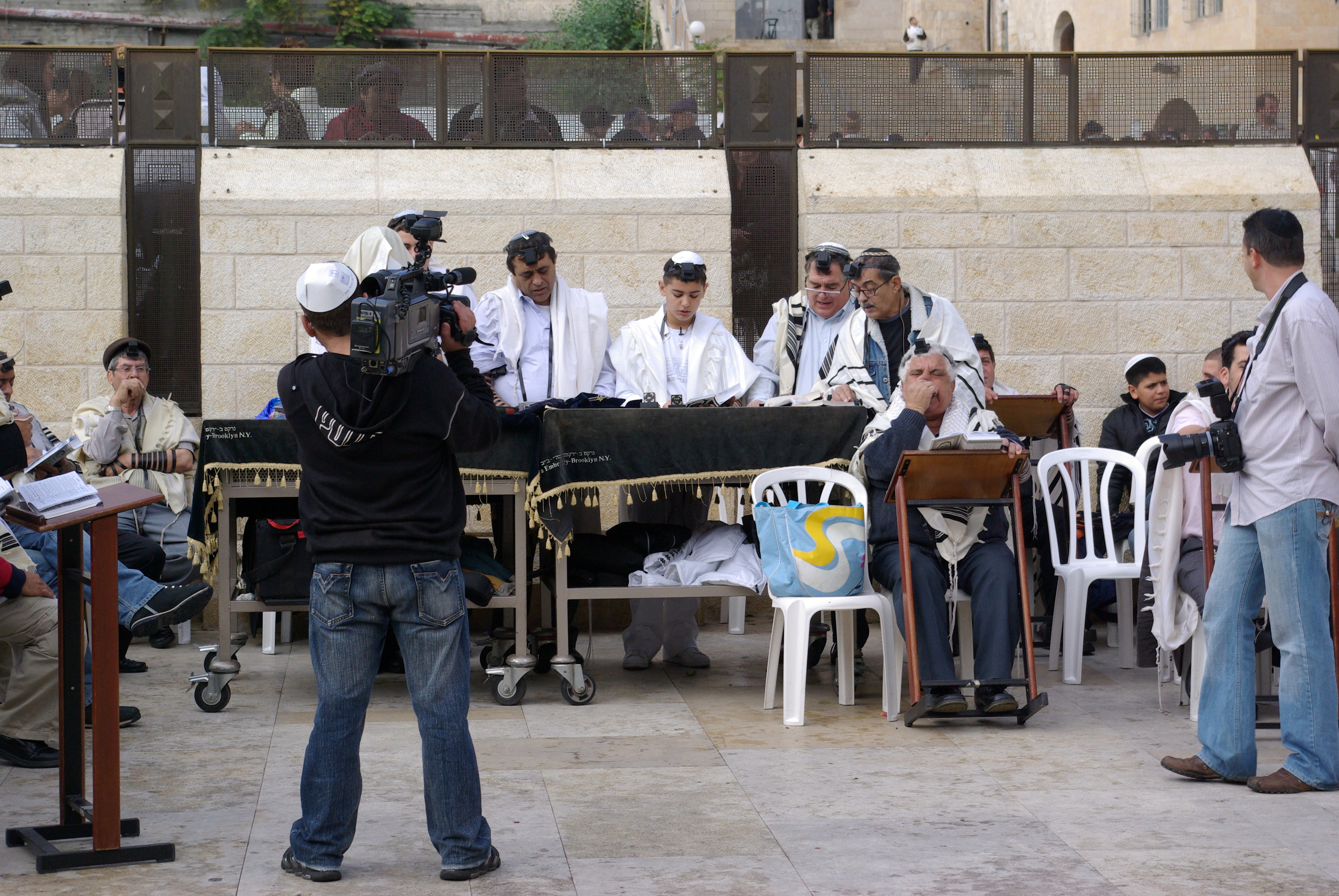
Bar mitzvah at the Western Wall

Instead of reading from the Torah, some Humanist Jews prefer a research paper on a topic in Jewish history to mark their coming of age. Secular Jewish Sunday schools and communities—including those affiliated with the Congress of Secular Jewish Organizations and The Workers Circle—encourage the youngsters to select any topic that interests them and relates to the Jewish part of their identities.

The kibbutz movement in Israel also encouraged the celebration of the bar mitzvah. All those coming of age in the community for that year would take on a project and research in a topic of Jewish or Zionist interest. Today many kibbutz children are opting for a more traditional bar mitzvah celebration.

Among some Jews, a person who has reached the age of 83 will celebrate a second bat or bar mitzvah, under the logic that in the Hebrew Bible it says that a normal lifespan is 70 years, so that an 83-year-old can be considered 13 in a second lifetime. This ritual is becoming more common as people live longer, healthier lives, and is considered akin to a couple renewing their vows.

A bark mitzvah is a pseudo-traditional observance and celebration of a dog's coming of age, as in the Jewish traditional bar and bat mitzvahs. The term has been in use since at least 1958, when Beverly Hills couple Janet and Sonny Salter held a bark mitzvah for their 13 year old dog, Windy. Rabbi Charles A. Kroloff expressed his distaste for Bark Mitzvahs in a letter to the editor of The New York Times, describing the ceremony as "nothing less than a desecration of a cherished Jewish tradition".

== Gifts ==
Bar or bat mitzvah celebrations have become an occasion to give the celebrant a commemorative gift. Traditionally, common gifts include books with religious or educational value, religious items, writing implements, savings bonds (to be used for the child's college education), gift certificates, or money. Gifts of cash have become commonplace in recent times. As with charity and all other gifts, it has become common to give in multiples of 18, since the gematria, or numerical equivalent of the Hebrew word for "life", ("chai"), is the number 18. Monetary gifts in multiples of 18 are considered to be particularly auspicious and have become common for the bar and bat mitzvah. Many b'nai mitzvah also receive their first tallit from their parents to be used for the occasion and tefillin where this is appropriate. Jewelry is a common gift for girls at a bat mitzvah celebration. Among jewelry gifts, a Star of David (Magen David) necklace is a classic choice, combining a lasting keepsake with one of the most widely recognized symbols of Jewish identity and Judaism. Another gift for the bat mitzvah girl is Shabbat candlesticks because it is the duty and honor of the woman to light the candles.

== In adults ==
While the traditional age to hold a bar or bat mitzvah is 13 for boys and 12 or 13 for girls, some adults choose to have a bar or bat mitzvah if they did not have one as adolescents, alongside the previously mentioned ceremony of having a second bar mitzvah when one turns 83.

== See also ==
- Brit milah
- Brit shalom
- Confirmation
- Upsherin
