= Haman in rabbinic literature =

Allusions in rabbinic literature to the Biblical character of Haman, the anti-Jewish villain of the Book of Esther, contain various expansions, elaborations and inferences beyond what is presented in the text of the Bible itself.

== Ancestry and other information ==
Haman is identified by the Talmudists with Memucan, the last of the seven princes "who saw the king's face" (Esther 1:14), giving to "Memucan" the signification of "prepared for punishment".

Haman was a direct descendant of Agag in the sixteenth generation and consequently an Amalekite. Haman's lineage is given in the Targum Sheni as follows: "Haman the son of Hammedatha the Agagite, son of Srach, son of Buza, son of Iphlotas, son of Dyosef, son of Dyosim, son of Prome, son of Ma'dei, son of Bla'akan, son of Intimros, son of Haridom, son of Sh'gar, son of Nigar, son of Farmashta, son of Vayezatha, (son of Agag, son of Sumkei,) son of Amalek, son of the concubine of Eliphaz, firstborn son of Esau". The Septuagint, however, gives for ha-Agagi "Macedonian" in Esther 9:24, while in the preceding instances no translation whatever is given.

Having attempted to exterminate the Jews of Persia, and rendering himself thereby their worst enemy, Haman naturally became the center of many Talmudic legends. Being at one time in extreme want, he sold himself as a slave to Mordecai. He was a barber at Kefar Ḳarẓum for the space of twenty-two years. Haman had an idolatrous image embroidered on his garments, so that those who bowed to him at command of the king bowed also to the image.

== Haman and his hatred of the Jews ==
Haman was also an astrologer, and when he was about to fix the time for the massacre of the Jews he first cast lots to ascertain which was the most auspicious day of the week for that purpose. Each day, however, proved to be under some influence favorable to the Jews. He then sought to fix the month, but found that the same was true of each month; thus, Nisan was favorable to the Jews because of the Passover sacrifice; Iyar, because of Pesach Sheni. But when he arrived at Adar he found that its zodiacal sign was Pisces, and he said, "Now I shall be able to swallow them as fish which swallow one another".

Haman had 365 counselors, but the advice of none was so good as that of his wife, Zeresh. She especially induced Haman to build a gallows for Mordecai, assuring him that this was the only way in which he would be able to prevail over his enemy, for hitherto the just had always been rescued from every other kind of death.

== Haman chooses tree for the gallows ==
As God foresaw that Haman himself would be hanged on the gallows. He asked which tree would volunteer to serve as the instrument of death. Each tree, declaring that it was used for some holy purpose, objected to being soiled by the unclean body of Haman. Only the thorn-tree could find no excuse, and therefore offered itself for a gallows.

Haman selected a thorn-tree in the king's garden, and, singing and rejoicing, set it up before his door, and said to himself, "Tomorrow, in the morning, at the time of the reading of the Shema, I shall hang Mordecai." Then he measured the tree by comparing it with his own person to see whether it was suited to the purpose. Just then a bat kol ("heavenly voice") came from heaven saying, "The tree is suited to thee; it is prepared for thee since the day of creation." He then went to the Beth midrash, where he found Mordecai surrounded by his 22,000 pupils, all with dust on their heads and clad in sack-cloth. Haman placed chains upon their necks and feet, and set guards over them, saying to himself, "I will first massacre these, and then I will hang Mordecai." It was the cry of these pupils ascending to heaven that brought about the sudden change in Haman's fate.

== Haman leads Mordecai through the streets ==
Haman tried hard to avoid the humiliation of leading Mordecai through the streets of Shushan; he implored the king to spare him that disgrace and offered every kind of reparation to Mordecai, but the king remained inflexible. At the time of leading Mordecai through the streets of Shushan, Haman performed the duties of four different callings: barber, bath attendant, groom, and public crier. He was also compelled to bend forward that Mordecai might mount from his back on to the horse.

It is also said that when King Ahasuerus rose from the banquet in anger and went into his garden he saw angels in the form of men felling the trees, who said that they were ordered to do so by Haman. According to Esther Rabba 10, it was the angel Michael that felled the trees and who afterward pushed Haman on to Esther's couch.

== Hanging of Haman ==
Haman was hanged on the second day of the Passover holiday. The Talmudists did not agree as to the number of Haman's sons; according to Rav there were thirty: ten had died, ten were hanged, and ten became beggars. According to the ancient rabbis, the beggars were seventy in number; according to Rami bar Abi, there were altogether two hundred and eight.

Pietro Perreau published in Steinschneider's "Hebr. Bibl." (vii. 46–47) a supposed text of Haman's circular regarding the massacre of the Jews (compare "Midrash Panim Aḥerim," first text, ed. Buber). The manuscript, which is found in the Parma Library (No. 924), dates from the thirteenth century.

== See also ==
- Sons of Haman
