= Moshe Chaim Luzzatto =

Italian rabbi and kabbalist (1707–1746)

RaMHaL רמח״ל Moshe Chaim Luzzatto
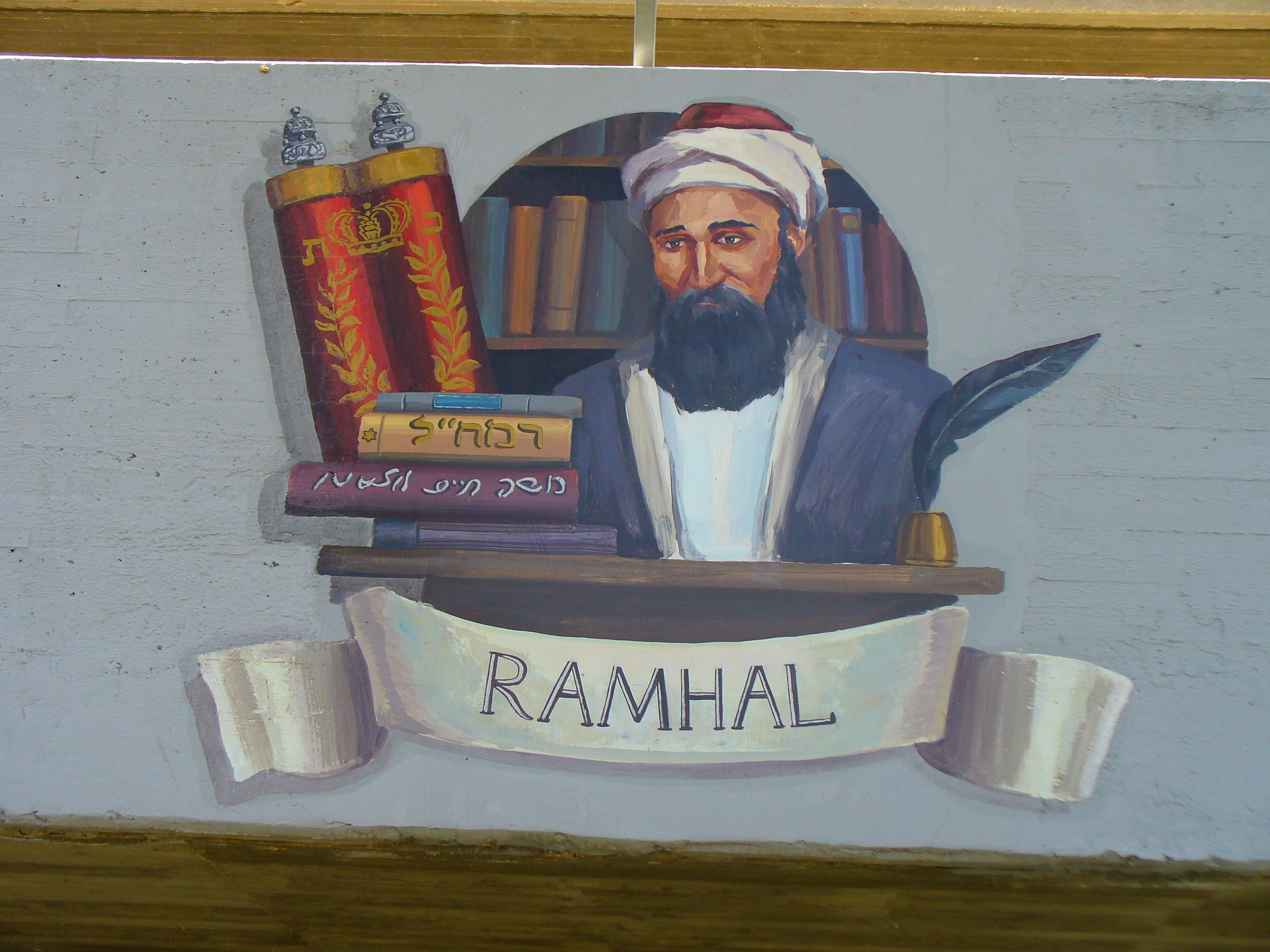
- Wall painting in Acre, Israel
- Title: Rabbi

Personal life
- Born: Moshe Chaim Luzzato; 1707 Padua, Republic of Venice
- Died: 16 May 1746 (aged 38–39) Acre, Ottoman Empire
- Parents: Jacob Vita (father); Diamente (mother)

Religious life
- Religion: Judaism

Jewish leader
- Yahrtzeit: 26 Iyar 5506

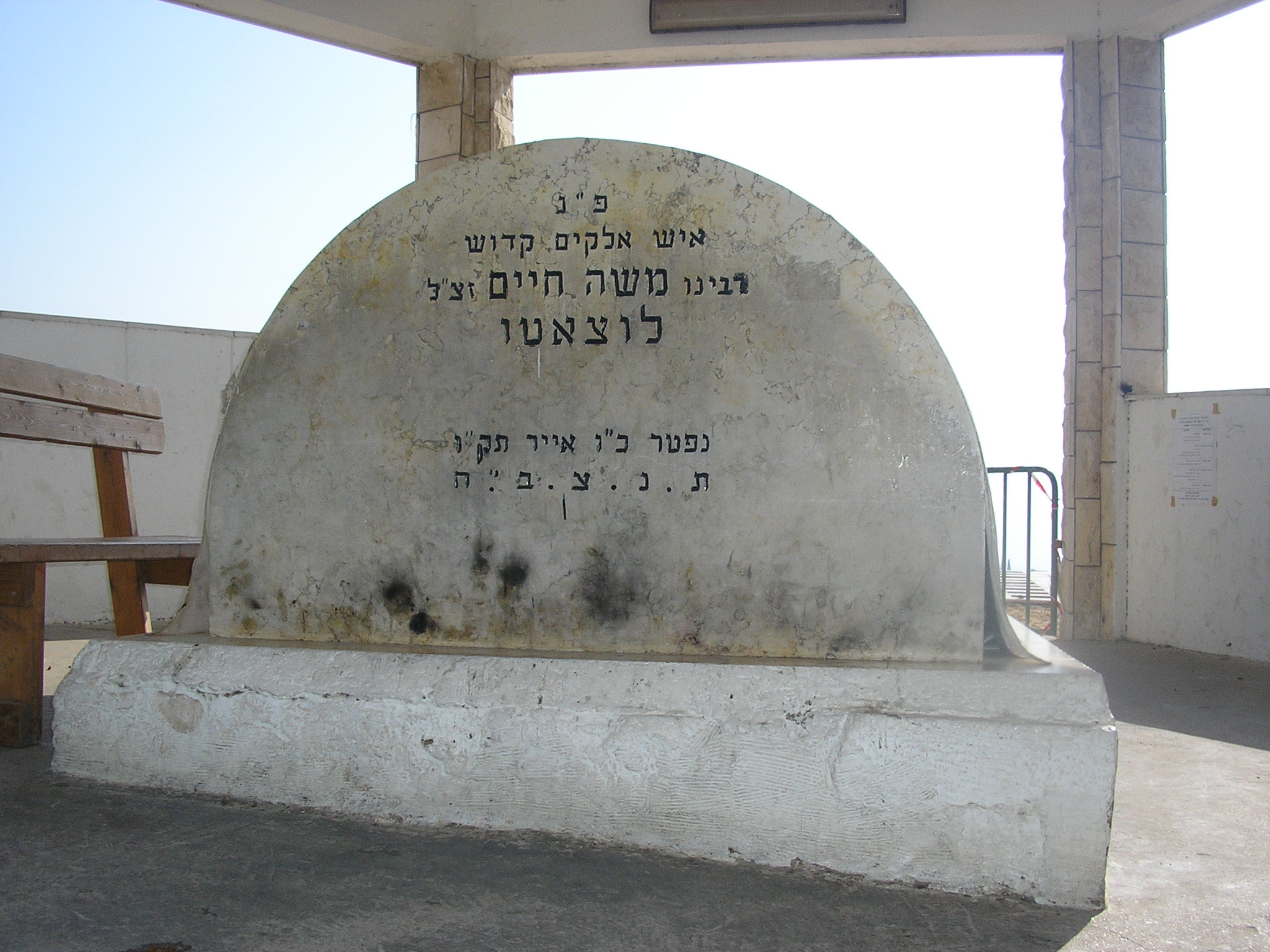
Tziyun (gravemark), or more likely the cenotaph of the Ramḥal in Tiberias, ir hakodesh (holy city), Israel

Moshe Chaim Luzzatto (Note: Also known as Moses Chaim, Moise Vita, Moses Hayyim or Luzzato) (Hebrew: משה חיים לוצאטו; 1707 – 16 May 1746), also known by the Hebrew acronym RaMCHaL or RaMḤaL (רמח״ל), was a rabbi, kabbalist, and philosopher in Italy.

== Biography ==
=== Early life ===
Moshe Chaim Luzzatto was born in 1707 in the Jewish ghetto of Padua, Republic of Venice. The son of Jacob Vita and Diamente Luzzatto, he received classical Jewish and Italian education, showing a predilection for literature at a very early age. He may have attended the University of Padua and was certainly associated with a group of students there who dabbled in Jewish mysticism and alchemy. With his vast knowledge in religious lore, the arts, and science, he quickly became the dominant figure in that group. His writings demonstrate mastery of the Tanakh, the Talmud, the Rabbinic commentaries, codes of Jewish law (Halakha) and Kabbalah.

=== Poetry and literature ===
At an early age, he began a thorough study of the Hebrew language and of poetic composition. He wrote epithalamia and elegies, a noteworthy example of the latter being the dirge on the death of his teacher, Rabbi Isaac Chayyim Cantarini, a lofty poem of twenty-four verses written in classical Hebrew. Before age 20, he had begun his composition of 150 hymns modeled on the biblical Psalms. In his hymns, composed in conformity with the laws of parallelism, he freed himself from all foreign influences, imitating the style of the Hebrew Bible so faithfully that his poems seem entirely a renaissance of biblical words and thoughts. They, however, provoked criticism from rabbis and were among the causes of the persecutions to which Luzzatto was later subjected. Rabbi Jacob Poppers of Frankfurt-on-the-Main thought it an unpardonable presumption to attempt to equal the "anointed of the God of Jacob". Only two of Luzzatto's psalms remain known; in addition, seven hymns by him which were sung at the inauguration of the enlarged Padua Synagogue appeared in the work Ḥanukkat ha-Maron (lit. 'Dedication [of] the Maron'; Venice, 1729), but it is not certain whether they were taken from the psalter.

As a youth, Luzzatto also essayed dramatic poetry, writing at the age of 17 his first biblical drama, "Shimshon u-Felistim" (of which only fragments have been preserved in another of his works). This youthful production foreshadows the coming master; it is perfect in versification, simple in language, original and thoughtful in substance. This first large work was followed by the "Leshon Limmudim", a discussion of Hebrew style with a new theory of Hebrew versification, in which the author showed his thorough knowledge of classical rhetoric. It is, in a certain sense, a scientific demonstration of the neoclassic Italian style, in contrast with the medieval. There is a vast difference between Luzzatto's style, which recalls the simplicity, smoothness, and vigor of the Bible, and the insipid, exaggerated, and affected work of his contemporaries. The book, dedicated to his teacher Bassani, was printed at Mantua in 1727, with a text which deviates from the manuscript formerly in the possession of M. S. Ghirondi.

In the same year or somewhat later, Luzzatto wrote his allegorical festival drama Migdal ʿOz (or Tummat Yesharim) on the occasion of the marriage of his friend Israel Benjamin Bassani. This four-act play, which shows Latin, Italian, and biblical influences, illustrates the victory of justice over iniquity. It is masterly in versification and melodious in language, the lyrical passages being especially lofty, and it has a wealth of pleasing imagery reminiscent of Guarini's Pastor Fido. The drama was edited by M. Letteris and published with notes by S. D. Luzzatto and prolegomena by Franz Delitzsch, Leipsic, 1837.

=== Controversy ===
The turning point in Luzzatto's life came at the age of twenty, when he claimed to have received direct instruction from an angel (known as a maggid). While stories of such encounters with celestial entities were not unknown in kabbalistic circles, it was unheard of for someone of such a young age. His peers were enthralled by his written accounts of these "Divine lessons", but the leading Italian rabbinical authorities were highly suspicious and threatened to excommunicate him. Just decades earlier another young mystic, Sabbatai Zevi (1626–1676), had rocked the Jewish world by claiming to be the Messiah. Although at one point, Zevi had convinced many European and Middle Eastern rabbis of his claim, the episode ended with him recanting and converting to Islam. The global Jewish community was still reeling from that, and the similarities between Luzzatto's writings and Zevi's were perceived as being particularly dangerous and heretical. Other rumors were spread that Luzzato had authored a new book of Psalms that was meant to supplant the Psalms in the Messianic Age, a claim which Luzzato and his mentor Yeshayahu Basan vigorously denied.

These writings, only some of which have survived, are often misunderstood as describing a belief that Luzzatto and his followers were key figures in a messianic drama about to take place. In this contentious interpretation, he identified one of his followers as Messiah ben David and assumed the role of Moses, claiming to be that biblical figure's reincarnation.

=== Departure from Italy ===
After threats of excommunication and many arguments, Luzzatto finally reached an understanding with the leading Italian rabbis, including his decision not to write the maggid's lessons or teach mysticism, and to hand over all his writings to his mentor, Yeshayahu Basan. In 1735, Luzzatto left Italy for Amsterdam, believing that in the more liberal environment there he could pursue his mystical interests. Passing through Germany, he appealed to the local rabbinical authorities to protect him from the threats of the Italian rabbis. They refused and forced him to sign a document stating that all the teachings of the maggid were false.

But the controversy was not yet over. Rumors spread that Luzzato's mentor, Yeshayahu Basan, sympathized with his pupil and even sent him back some of his writings to publish. This caused a major uproar, and many heated letters passed between Moshe Hagiz and Yaakov Poppers, and Basan, threatening to undermine the latter's authority if he did not hand over the box containing Luzzato's writings to the rabbis of Venice. In one letter, Moshe Hagiz, Luzzato's staunchest opponent, calls Luzzato a wretched renegade who betrayed his religion and lost his portion in the world to come, calling and urging for the burning of all his writings. Basan was forced to hand over Luzzato's writings to Poppers, who subsequently buried deep in the ground and burnt some of the writings he deemed heretical.

=== Amsterdam ===
When Luzzatto finally reached Amsterdam, he was able to pursue his Kabbalah studies relatively unhindered. Earning a living as a diamond cutter, he continued writing but refused to teach. It was in this period that he wrote his masterpiece, the Mesillat Yesharim (1740), essentially an ethical treatise but with certain mystical underpinnings. The book presents a step-by-step process by which every person can overcome the inclination to sin and might eventually experience a divine inspiration similar to prophecy. Another prominent work, Derekh Hashem 'The Way of God' is a concise work on the core theology of Judaism. The same concepts are discussed in brief in a smaller book, the Maʾamar Haʾiqqarim maʾamar ḥokhma (מאמר העיקרים מאמר החכמה). Da'at Tevunot 'The Knowing Heart' also existed in Amsterdam as the missing link between rationality and Kabbalah, a dialogue between the intellect and the soul. On the other hand, Derech Tevunot ("The Way of Understanding") introduces the logic that structures Talmudic debates as a means to understanding the world.

One major contemporary rabbi who praised Luzzatto's writing was the Vilna Gaon (1720–1797), widely regarded as the most authoritative Torah sage of the modern era and a great kabbalist himself. He was reputed to have said after reading the Mesillat Yesharim that if Luzzatto were still alive, he would have walked from Vilna to learn at Luzzatto's feet. He stated that having read the work, the first ten chapters contained not a superfluous word.

Luzzatto also wrote poetry and drama. Although most of it is seemingly secular, some scholars claim to have identified mystical undertones in this body of work as well. His writing is strongly influenced by the Jewish poets of al-Andalus and by contemporary Italian authors.

The cantor of the Sephardic synagogue in Amsterdam, Abraham Caceres, worked with Luzzatto to set several of his poems to music.

=== Acre ===
Frustrated by his inability to teach Kabbalah, Luzzatto left Amsterdam for the Holy Land in 1743, settling in Acre. Three years later, he and his family died in a plague.

== Legacy ==
=== Burial site ===
The site of his tomb is unknown. A third-hand account claims that his burial place is near the Talmudic sage Rabbi Akiva in Tiberias, now northern Israel. Other scholars claim to have identified his tomb in the Jewish cemetery of Kafr Yasif. It is noteworthy that many rabbis have made some comparisons between the Ramchal and Akiva, both during and after their lives. Some have gone as far as to claim that the Ramchal was a reincarnation of Rabbi Akiva. The Tiberias site has many more amenities than the Kafr Yassif grave, with an attached synagogue and tourist shops, making it far more popular.

=== Synagogue in Acre ===
Luzzato's original synagogue in Akko was razed by the city's Bedouin ruler, Daher al-Umar, in 1758, who built a mosque on top of it. In its place, the Jews of Akko received a small building north of the mosque which still functions as a synagogue and bears Luzzato's name.

=== Religious writings ===
A century after his death, Luzzatto was rediscovered by the Musar movement, which adopted his ethical works. It was the great Torah ethicist, Israel Salanter (1810–1883), who placed the Messilat Yesharim at the heart of the Musar (ethics) curriculum of the major yeshivas of Eastern Europe. Derech Hashem, Luzzato's treatise on Jewish theology, eventually came to be considered as an authoritative guide of Jewish theology. The work is a compilation of authoritative opinions found in Talmudic sources.

Most of his writings were burned, though some did survive. From the Zoharic writings, the 70 Tiqqunim Hadashim reappeared in 1958 against all odds, in the Bodleian Library. "Arrangements" of thoughts, these "Tiqqunim" explicate 70 essential uses of the last verse of the Torah. Supposedly taught word-for-word in Aramaic by Luzzatto's maggid, they parallel the Tikunei haZohar 'Rectifications of the Zohar' ascribed by some to Shimon bar Yochai, which describe the 70 fundamental understandings of the first verse of the Humash (Books of Moses).

=== Secular literary legacy ===
The Hebrew writers of the Haskalah, the Jewish expression of the Age of Enlightenment, greatly admired Luzatto's secular writings and deemed him the founder of modern Hebrew literature. His cousin, the poet Ephraim Luzzatto (1729–1792), also exerted genuine influence on the first stirrings of modern Hebrew poetry.

== Bibliography ==
Following are a selection of other books written by RaMChaL:

- Ma'aseh Shimshon ("The Story of Samson")
- Lashon Limudim ("A Tongue for Teaching")
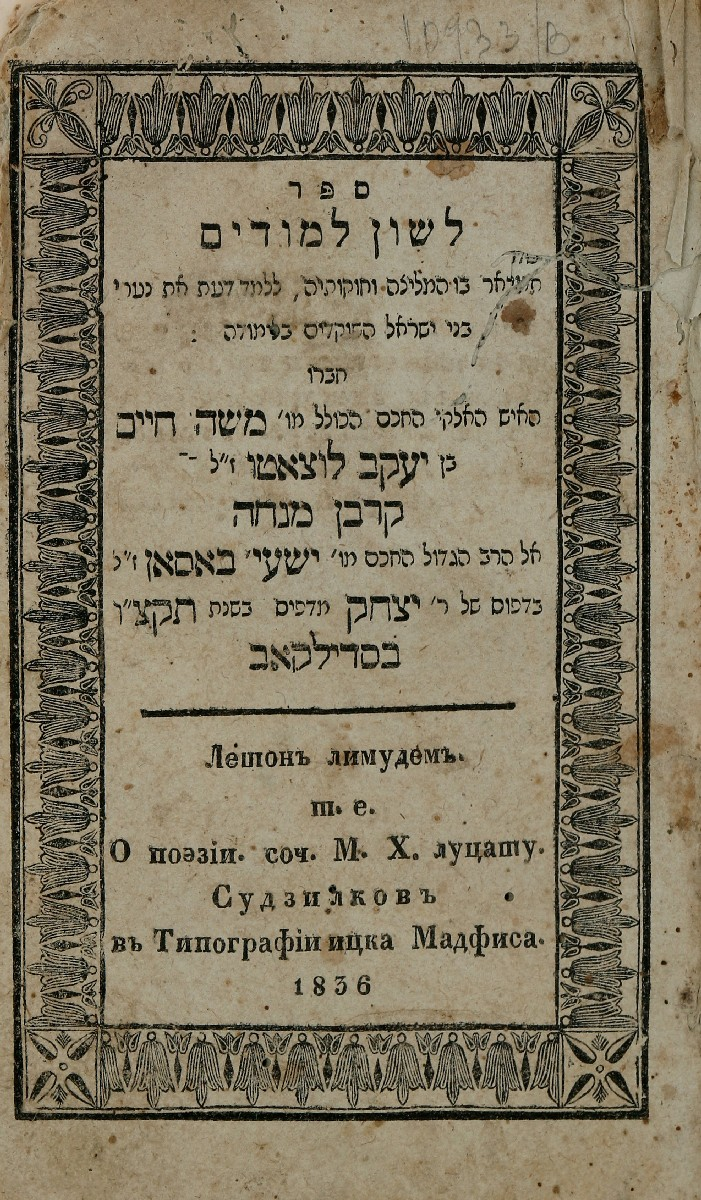
  An 1836 edition of Lashon limudim
- Migdal Oz ("A Tower of Strength")
- Zohar Kohelet ("The Zohar to the Book of Ecclesiastes")
- Shivʿim Tiqqunim ("Seventy Tiqqunim") which parallels the seventy Tikkunei Zohar
- Zohar Tinyanah ("A Second Zohar") no longer exists
- Klallot Haillan or Klalut Hailan ("The Principal Elements of The Tree [of Life]") a synopsis of the ARI's basic work of Kabbalah
- Ma'amar HaShem ("A Discourse on God")
- Ma'amar HaMerkava ("A Discourse on The Chariot")
- Ma'amar Shem Mem-Bet ("A Discourse on the 42 letter Name [of God]")
- Ma'amar HaDin ("A Discourse on [Divine] Judgment")
- Ma'amar HaChochma or Maamar Ha'hokhma ("A Discourse on Wisdom") focuses on Rosh Hashanah, Yom Kippur, and Passover from a Kabbalistic perspective
- Ma'amar HaGeulah ("A Discourse on The Redemption" or "The Great Redemption")
- Ma'amar HaNevuah ("A Discourse on Prophecy")
- Mishkanei Elyon or Mishkane 'Elyon ("Exalted Towers") a Kabbalistic understanding of the Holy Temple with a depiction of the third Temple's dimensions
- Ain Yisrael ("The Well of Israel")
- Ain Yaakov ("The Well of Jacob")
- Milchamot HaShem ("The Wars of God") which defends Kabbalah against its detractors
- Kinnaot HaShem Tzivakot or Kinat H' Tsevaot ("Ardent [Defenses] for The L-rd of Hosts") offers details about the redemption and the Messiah.
- Adir Bamarom ("[God is] Mighty on High") a commentary on the Iddrah Rabbah ("The Great Threshing Room") section of the Zohar
- Iggrot Pitchei Chochma v'Da'at or Klale Pit'he 'Hokhma Veda'at ("Letters [to Serve] as an Opening to Wisdom and Knowledge") spells out and explains certain erudite principles of the Jewish faith according to the Kabbalah
- Sefer Daniel ("The Book of Daniel"), an esoteric commentary to this biblical work
- Tiktu Tephilot ("515 Prayers") focuses on prayers for the revelation of God's sovereignty
- Kitzur Kavvanot ("Abbreviated Intentions") allows the reader an overview of the ARI's recorded prayer-intentions
- Ma'amar HaVechuach ("A Discourse [that serves as] The Argument") pits a Kabbalist against a rationalist as each tries to defend his way of thinking
- Klach Pitchei Chochma or Kala'h Pitkhe 'Hokhma ("138 Openings to Wisdom") one of Ramchal's most important works in that it lays out his thinking about the symbolic nature of the Ari's writings and Ramchal's own explanations of those symbols
- Areichat Klallot HaEilan ("A Dictionary of The Principal Elements to The Tree [of Life]")
- Klallim ("Principal Elements") a series of short and pithy presentations of the main principles of the Kabbalistic system said outright
- Da'at Tevunot or Da'ath Tevunoth ("The Knowing Heart" or "Knowing the Reasons"), a work that explains the duality of positive and negative that exists on all levels of reality, that this is the basis of God's "showing his face/hiding his face" to and from humanity, and the dual existence of good and evil
- Peirush al Midrash Rabbah ("A Commentary on Midrash Rabbah") that is not Kabbalistic so much as symbolic
- Derech Hashem or Derekh HaShem ("The Way of God") one of his best known works: a succinct laying-out of the fundamentals of the Jewish faith touching upon mankind's obligations in this world and its relations to God
- Ma'amar al HaAggadot ("A Discourse on Aggadah") which is an explanation that Aggadic literature is not literal but metaphoric
- Ma'amar HaIkkurim or Maamar Ha'ikarim ("A Discourse on the Fundamentals") a short and succinct laying-out of the fundamentals of the Jewish religion like "The Way of God" that touches upon certain other themes
- Derech Chochma or Sepher Derekh 'Hokhma ("The Way of Wisdom"), which serves as a dialogue between a young person and a sage with the latter setting out a lifetime course of Torah study culminating in the study of Kabbalah
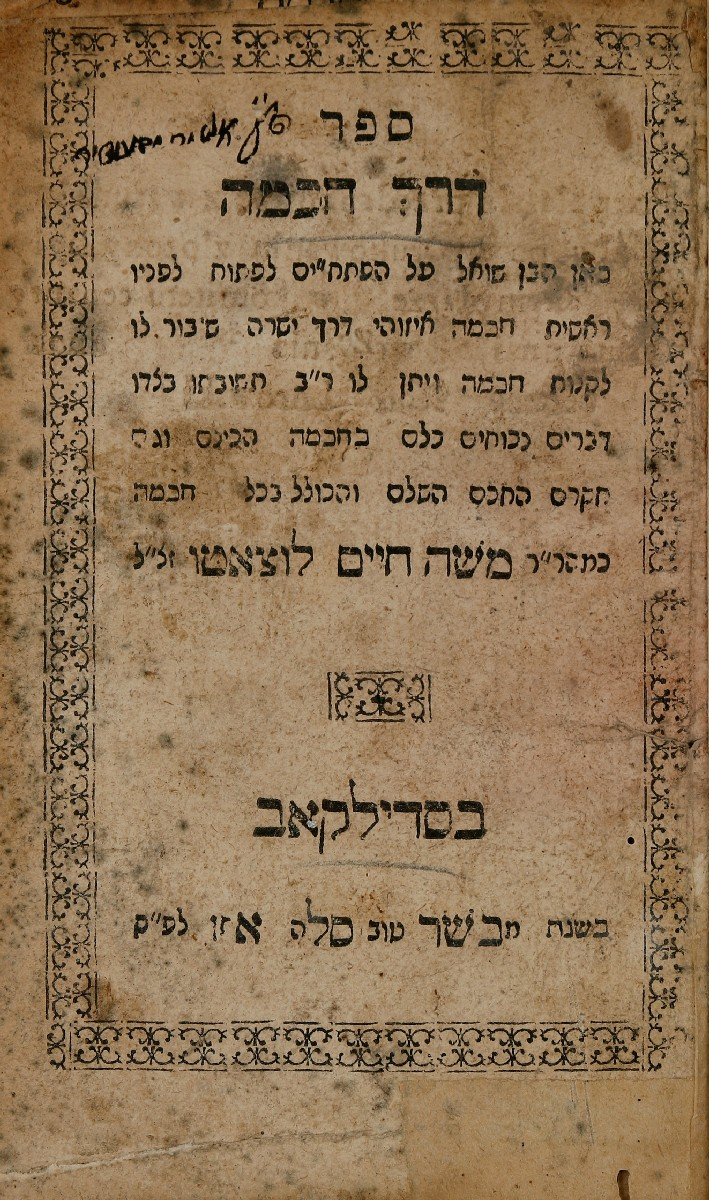
  An 1833 edition of Derech Chochma
- Vichuach HaChocham V'HaChassid ("The Argument between the Sage and the Pious Man") which is actually a first draft of Messilat Yesharim that only resurfaced recently
- Messilat Yesharim or Mesilat Yesharim ("The Path of the Just"), his most famous work that enables its readers to grow in piety step by step, was written when he was 33 (in 1740)
- Sefer HaDikduk ("The Book of Grammar")
- Sefer HaHigayon ("The Book of Logic") lays out the correct way to think and analyze
- Ma'amar al HaDrasha ("A Discourse on Homilies") encourages the study of Kabbalah and Mussar
- Sefer Hamalitza ("The Book of Style") offers the art of accurate writing and expression
- Derech Tevunot ("The Way of Understanding") explains the Talmudic way of thinking
- LaYesharim Tehilla ("Praise be to the Upright") is a dramatic work

== See also ==
- History of the Jews in Italy
- Italian Jews
- List of Italian Jews
- Musar literature
- Mussar movement
