= Oscar Rex =

Austrian painter (1857–1929)

- Born: 26 March 1857; Graz, Austria-Hungary
- Died: 8 February 1929 (aged 71); Prague, Czechoslovakia
- Movement: Genre art

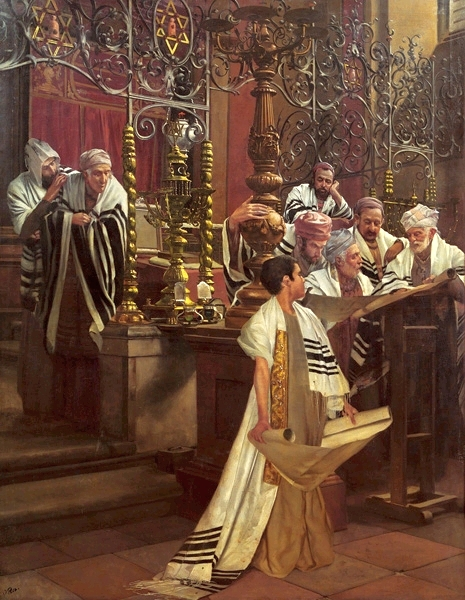
Oscar Rex, Bar Mitzvah

Oscar Rex (sometimes spelled Oskar; 26 March 1857 – 8 February 1929) was an Austrian genre painter.

== Early life ==
Born in Graz, Rex grew up in Prague. From 1876 to 1877, he was a member of the Corps Austria. From about 1889, he was a member of the Corps Palaio-Austria in Prague.

In January, 1878, Rex studied at the Munich Academy of Fine Arts. In 1881, he went to Paris to study as a student of Mihály Munkácsy, Gustave Boulanger, and Jules-Joseph Lefebvre.

In 1889, Rex participated in an exhibition of the Munich Artists' Association. He returned to Prague around 1890. In 1891, a drawing of him at the Annual Exhibition of Visual Artists of Vienna was displayed. One of Rex's works was awarded a bronze medal at the 1900 World Exhibition in Paris. Shortly before the First World War, an exhibit of about 30 of his paintings depicting scenes from the life of Napoleon Bonaparte was displayed in 38 cities.

== Family ==
Rex came from a medical family. His grandfather, Franz Rex (1795–1855), was a native of Brno and a practicing surgeon in Prague. Oscar Rex was the son of Ignaz Rex (born 1822), who served as the chief of staff at Arzt and conductor of the Prague garrison hospital; Oscar's mother was Emma Schulz (1832–1884). Oscar's brother, Hugo Rex, was a professor of medicine. Oscar Rex married Marie Eudes (born 1860); after her death, he married Thébauet Nora (born 1867).

== Works (selection) ==
=== Paintings ===
- Im Park von Malmaison
- C'est fini (representation of Napoleon on the beach of Saint Helena)

=== Books ===
- Digitalisat Praha je Praha [= Prag ist Prag], Prag: Karel Bellmann o.J. (= Buch mit 30 Phototypien nach Tuschezeichnungen von Rex. Dargestellt sind Szenen aus dem Alltagsleben in Prag)
- K. and K., Prague: Bellmann 1893 (. = folder with 40 mounted Phototypien after paintings by Oscar Rex Shown are scenes from the Austrian military service)
- Illustrations about: Ernst Wenke: History of the Habsburg 1 Bohemian Dragoon Regiment Kaiser Franz, Prague: Publishing of the Regiment, 1896

== Literature ==
- Hermann Alexander Müller, Hans Wolfgang Singer (ed.): Digitized artists of the world. Volume 4 Rüttenenstrasse & Loening, Frankfurt am Main, 1922, p 49
- Thieme-Becker: General Encyclopedia of Artists, volume 28, Leipzig, 1934, p 14
