= Kaf Hachayim =

Kaf Hachayim (Hebrew: כף החיים; translation: "the palm of life") is the title of two widely cited codes of Jewish law. It may refer to:

- a work by Rabbi Yaakov Chaim Sofer
- a work by Rabbi Hayim Palaggi
