= Job in rabbinic literature =

Allusions in rabbinic literature to the Biblical character Job, the object of sufferings and tribulations in the Book of Job, contain various expansions, elaborations and inferences beyond what is presented in the text of the Bible itself.

== His life ==
Owing to the importance of the Book of Job, the Talmudists occupied themselves frequently with its chief character. One of the amoraim expressed his opinion in the presence of Samuel ben Nahmani that Job never existed and that the whole story was a fable. An opinion couched in similar words and pronounced by Simeon ben Lakish was interpreted to mean that such a person as Job existed, but that the narratives in the drama are inventions.

Apart from these utterances, all of the rabbis took it for granted that Job existed, but they differed widely as to the epoch in which he lived and his nationality, two points of discussion closely connected. All Talmudists inferred Job's epoch and nationality from an analogy between two Biblical words or sentences. According to Bar Kappara, Job lived in the time of Abraham; according to Abba bar Kahana, in the time of Jacob, he married Dinah, Jacob's daughter.

Rabbi Levi said that Job lived in the time of Jacob's sons; and he also said, in the name of Jose ben Halafta, that Job was born when Jacob and his children entered Egypt and that he died when the Israelites left that country. Job consequently lived 210 years. When Satan came to accuse the Israelites of being idolaters, God set him against Job, whence Job's misfortunes. This opinion is supported by the statement that Job with Jethro and Balaam was consulted by Pharaoh as to the means of reducing the number of the children of Israel and that Job was stricken with calamity because he had remained silent.

This legend is narrated differently in Sefer ha-Yashar as follows: At first Job, who was one of Pharaoh's eunuchs and counselors, advised Pharaoh to have every male child murdered. Afterward, Pharaoh, having had a dream which prognosticated the birth of a helper, again consulted Job. The latter answered evasively: "Let the king do as he pleases".

Levi b. Laḥma also held that Job lived in the time of Moses, by whom the Book of Job was written. Some of the rabbis even declare that the one servant of Pharaoh who feared the word of God (Exodus 9:20) was Job. Raba, specifying the time more accurately, said Job lived in the time of the spies who Moses sent to explore the land of Canaan. According to these rabbis, Job was a Gentile—an opinion which is elsewhere expressed more fully, in that Job is said to have been a pious Gentile or one of the prophets of the Gentiles.

Other tannaim place Job variously in the reign of Saba, in that of the Chaldeans, and in that of Ahasuerus. R. Johanan and R. Eleazar declared that Job was one of those who returned from the Captivity and that his bet ha-midrash was at Tiberias. It is said in Bava Batra that these tannaim necessarily considered Job an Israelite; but R. Chananel ben Chushiel has in his text, "All the Tannaim and Amoraim, with the exception of the one who placed Job in the time of Jacob, thought that Job was an Israelite".

Job's prosperity is thus described: Samuel bar Isaac said: "He who received a prutah from Job prospered in his affairs." Jose bar Hanina inferred from Job 1:10 that Job's goats could kill wolves, and R. Johanan inferred from Job 1:14 that God gave Job a foretaste of the bliss of paradise. Satan, seeing Job's extraordinary prosperity, was filled with envy and therefore began in the councils of heaven to disparage Job's piety.

It was said that Job lived 210 years; this is inferred from Job 42:16, where it is said that he lived 140 years after his recovery. It is also said that the whole world mourned Job's death.

== His suffering ==
According to the Targum Yerushalmi the two councils of heaven took place respectively on Rosh ha-Shanah and Yom Kippur. When the messenger told Job that the Sabeans had seized his oxen, he armed his men and prepared to make war upon them. But the second messenger came, telling him that a fire from heaven had destroyed his sheep, and he then said: "Now I can do nothing".

The wind that blew down his house was one of the three great winds whose power was sufficient to destroy the world. Job was stricken by God with fifty different plagues. His house was filled with a bad smell, and Job sat down on a dunghill. His flesh was filled with worms which made holes in his body and began to quarrel with one another. Job thereupon placed every worm in a hole, saying: "It is my flesh, yet you quarrel about it'

Job's sufferings lasted twelve months; then God, yielding to the prayer of the angels, healed him and restored to him twofold what he had before. Only the number of Job's daughters was not doubled. Nevertheless, their beauty was doubled, and therefore their names, indicating their extraordinary charms, are given.

The legendary accounts of Job extend also to his three friends. These entered his house simultaneously, though they lived 300 miles apart. Each had a crown or, according to another statement, a tree on which the images of the three friends were carved; and when a misfortune befell any one of them his image was altered.

== His character ==
It was chiefly Job's character and piety that concerned the Talmudists. He is particularly represented as a most generous man. Like Abraham, he built an inn at the cross-roads, with four doors opening respectively to the four cardinal points, in order that wayfarers might have no trouble in finding an entrance, and his name was praised by all who knew him. His time was entirely occupied with works of charity, as visiting the sick and the like. Still more characteristic is Rava's statement that Job used to take away, ostensibly by force, a field which belonged to orphans, and after making it ready for sowing would return it to the owners.

Job was also of exemplary piety. Like Abraham he recognized God by intuition. Nothing in his possession had been acquired by rapacity, and therefore his prayer was pure. He, Melchizedek, and Enoch were as spotless as Abraham. He took the greatest care to keep himself aloof from every unseemly deed. According to Targum Sheni Job's name was one of the seven engraved on the seven branches of the golden candlestick.

But these features of Job's character made the Rabbis apprehend that he might eclipse Abraham; and some of them therefore depreciated Job's piety. Yohanan ben Zakkai used to say that Job's piety was only the result of his fear of punishment. In Avot of Rabbi Natan where the generosity of Job is so much praised, it is concluded that when he, after having been afflicted, complained that he was inadequately rewarded, God said to him: "Thy generosity has not yet attained to the half of that of Abraham." R. Levi even went as far as to exculpate Satan, declaring that he had the same apprehension that God might forget the piety of Abraham.

Still, even among the tannaim, Job had his defenders, e.g., Joshua b. Hyrcanus, whose opinion was that Job worshiped God out of pure love. This difference of opinion existed with regard to Job's attitude at the time of his misfortune. R. Eliezer said that Job blasphemed God (the Talmudic expression being "he desired to upset the dish"), but R. Joshua considered that Job spoke harsh words against Satan only. This discussion was continued by Abaye and Raba, of whom the former pleaded for Job, while Raba followed R. Eliezer's opinion. Raba's (according to another text, Rab's) expression was "dust into the mouth of Job." He inferred from the passage "and yet Job sinned not with his lips" that Job sinned in his heart.

In Talmudic literature it is generally assumed that Job sinned or, as the expression is, "he rebelled". It is further said that if Job had not sinned, people would recite in prayer "and the God of Job," just as they recite "the God of Abraham, Isaac, and Jacob," but he rebelled. Job's chief complaint was, according to Raba, that although man is driven to sin by the seducer ("yetzer ha-ra'"), whom God Himself has created, yet he is punished. But Eliphaz answered him: "Thou castest off fear" meaning, if God created the seducer, He also created the Torah, by which a man can subdue the seducer. Raba concluded also that Job denied resurrection.

A more picturesque treatment of Job's bitterness against God is recorded by Rabbah or Raba: Job blasphemed God by using the term "tempest" when he said, "For he breaks me with a tempest", which passage is interpreted by the Rabbis to mean, "Perhaps a tempest passed before Thee which caused the confusion between Job (איוב) and the enemy (אויב). The Talmud records that God had only doubled Job's fortune at the end of the tale in order to deplete the reward that was due to him in the next world (implying that he had failed his test). Still, Rabbi's opinion was that Job spoke in praise of God more than Elihu did.

== The Book of Job ==
It has already been said that the Book of Job was ascribed by the Rabbis to Moses. Its place in the canon is between Psalms and Proverbs. The high priest read the Book of Job for diversion before Yom Kippur. According to the Talmudists, he who sees the Book of Job in a dream may anticipate a misfortune. There was an ancient Targum to Job, which the Talmudists considered a dangerous work.
