= Ezra in rabbinic literature =

Allusions in rabbinic literature to the Biblical character of Ezra, the leader and lawgiver who brought some of the Judean exiles back from Babylonian captivity, contain various expansions, elaborations and inferences beyond what is presented in the text of the Bible itself.

== His work ==
According to Shir ha-Shirim Rabbah, Ezra marks the springtime in the national history of Judaism; "the flowers appear on the earth" (Canticles 2:12) are considered a reference to Ezra and Nehemiah.

Ezra was worthy of being the vehicle of the Torah, had it not been already given through Moses. The Torah was forgotten, but Ezra restored it. Were it not for its sins, Israel in the time of Ezra would have witnessed miracles as in the time of Joshua.

Ezra was the disciple of Baruch ben Neriah. his studies prevented him from joining the first party returning to Jerusalem in the reign of Cyrus the Great, the study of the Law being of greater importance than the reconstruction of the Second Temple. According to another opinion, Ezra remained behind so as not to compete, even involuntarily, with Joshua ben Jotzadak for the office of chief priest. Nonetheless, there is a slight controversy within rabbinic sources as to whether or not Ezra had served as Kohen Gadol.

Ezra reestablished the text of the Torah, introducing therein the Assyrian or square characters, possibly as a polemical measure against the Samaritans. He showed his doubts concerning the correctness of some words of the text by placing points over them. Should Elijah, said he, approve the text, the points will be disregarded; should he disapprove, the doubtful words will be removed from the text. These dots are called eser nekudot.

Ezra wrote the Book of Chronicles and the book bearing his name, the Book of Ezra.

== Praise of Ezra ==
Ezra is regarded and quoted as the type of person most competent and learned in the Law (Torah).

The rabbis associate his name with several important institutions. It was he who ordained that three men should read ten verses from the Torah on Monday and Thursday and on Shabbat afternoon; that the "curses" in Leviticus should be read before Shavuot, and those in Deuteronomy before Rosh Hashanah. He ordained also that courts be in session on Mondays and Thursdays; that garments be washed on these days; that garlic be eaten on the eve of Sabbath; that the wife should rise early and bake bread in the morning; that women should wear a girdle; that women should bathe and wash their hair three days prior to their immersion; that peddlers go forth into cities where market days were established; that under certain contingencies men should take a ritual bath; that the reading at the conclusion of the blessings should be min ha-olam ve-ad ha-olam ("from eternity to eternity", against the Sadducees).

His name is also associated with the work of the Great Assembly. He is said to have pronounced the Divine Name according to its proper sounds, and the beginnings of the Hebrew calendar are traced back to him.

== Malachi ==
Ezra is identified with Malachi by Joshua ben Karha.

== Death and place of burial ==
According to tradition, Ezra died at the age of 120 in Babylonia. Benjamin of Tudela was shown his grave on the Shatt al-Arab, near the point where the Tigris flows into the Euphrates According to another legend, he was at the time of his death in Babylon, as a courtier in the retinue of Artaxerxes. In the selichah אלה אזכרה for the Tenth of Tevet, the date of Ezra's death is given as the 9th of Tevet.
