= Immanuel Hai Ricchi =

Immanuel Hai Ricchi (or Immanuel Hai ben Avraham Refael) was an Italian rabbi, kabbalist, and poet; born at Ferrara 1688, killed near Cento on 25 February 1743.

== Biography ==
About two years after Ricchi's birth his father removed to Rovigo, where he died four years later. Ricchi, thus left an orphan, was brought up by his maternal uncle Jedidiah Rabbino, and later by his cousin and brother-in-law, the son of the latter. After having studied Talmud under Nathan Pinkerle, rabbi of Alessandria della Paglia, Ricchi became tutor in the houses of several wealthy Jews. He was thus successively employed at Göritz, Fiorenzuola, Finale in Modena, and Venice; in the last-named place he opened a school. He then went to Triest, where he was ordained rabbi in 1717 by Hillel Ashkenazi, rabbi of Canea, after which he was invited to the rabbinate of Görz.

Owing to his great love for kabbalistic studies and to his ascetic tendencies, Ricchi resolved to settle in the Land of Israel. He arrived at Safed in 1718, and during his stay there of two years he occupied himself with the study of the works of Isaac Luria and Hayyim Vital. He was also reordained rabbi by Hayyim Abulafia. In 1720 an epidemic broke out in Palestine, and Ricchi was compelled to return to Europe. On the voyage he and all his fellow passengers were captured by pirates and brought to Tripolitza, whence, through the efforts of Abraham Ḥalfon, Ricchi and his family were allowed to return to Italy.

He then occupied the rabbinate of Florence till 1723, in which year he removed to Leghorn, where for twelve years he engaged in business as a merchant. He spent twenty months in travel, visiting Smyrna, Salonica, Constantinople, Amsterdam, and London, and in 1735 set out for Palestine, spending two years at Aleppo and three at Jerusalem.

In 1741 he returned to Leghorn. In 1743, while traveling in Italy for the purpose of selling his works, he was killed by robbers, who buried his body by the shore of the Reno. Six days later some Modena Jews discovered the remains and brought them to Cento for burial.

== Works ==
Ricchi was the author of the following works (enumerated here in the chronological order of their composition):

- "Ma'aseh Hoshev" (Venice, 1716), a treatise on the construction of the Tabernacle and its vessels, in the form of a compendium of the ancient texts on the same subject, together with his commentary. The work is followed by a Hebrew poem on the letters אהחע"ר.
- "Hon Ashir" (Amsterdam, 1731), a commentary on the Mishnah, followed by a poem, set to music, on Sabbath, circumcision, and tefillin.
- "Hoshev Mahashavot" (ib. 1732), aggadic novellae on the Bible and Talmud, together with treatises on the measurements of the Miḳweh and on other geometrical subjects.
- "Mishnat Hasidim" (ib. 1727; see below).
- "Yosher Levav" (ib. 1737), kabbalistic interpretations of Biblical and Talmudic passages.
- "Hazeh Tziyyon" (Leghorn, 1742), kabbalistic commentary on the Psalms.
- "Aderet Eliyahu" (ib. 1742), commentary on the difficult passages and expressions of the Mishnah and Gemara, in two parts, the second of which is entitled "Mei Niddah," and deals solely with the treatise Niddah. This treatise is followed by: (a) 24 responsa; (b) "Sofei Anavim," novellae; and (c) "Perpera'ot laHokmah," riddles and poems, among the latter being six religious hymns, composed for different occasions.

A responsum of Ricchi's on the modulation of the priests' blessing is to be found in Nehemiah b. Baruch's "Metzitz uMeliẓ" (Venice, 1715). His "Makkat Bakkurot," strictures on Phinehas Hai Piatelli's "Tosefet Bikkurei Katzir," is as yet unpublished.

=== Mishnat Hasidim ===
Ricchi's most important work is the above-cited "Mishnat Hasidim," a kabbalistic work begun in 1726 at Leghorn. Like the Mishnah, it is arranged in orders ("sedarim"), which are divided into treatises ("masekhtot") and subdivided into chapters ("perakim"), the names of the six Mishnah orders being taken in a kabbalistic sense. But the main divisions of the work are three, termed "maftehot," besides the introduction entitled "Olam Katon" (= "microcosmos"), in which Ricchi endeavors to popularize the kabbalah.

The first main division is the "Mafteach haOlamot," in which the worlds are treated. It contains:

1. the order of Zera'im, covering the kabbalistic cosmology and of metaphysics, and divided into seven masekhtot and eighteen chapters;
2. the order Kodashim, covering the realm of emanation ("olam ha-atzilut"), which is styled "the holy of holies," and containing twenty massektot and seventy-eight chapters;
3. the order Ṭohorot, treating of the three other realms, namely, those of creative ideas ("beri'ah"), creative formations ("yetzirah"), and creative matter ("asiyah"), and divided into nine masekhtot and 27 chapters; and
4. the order Neziḳin, treating of the demons and "kelipot," and divided into six masekhtot and 17 chapters.

The second main division, entitled "Mafteach haNeshamot," contains the order Nashim, treating of souls, in twelve masekhtot and 48 chapters.

The third main division, entitled "Mafteach haKavanot," contains the order Mo'ed, divided into 58 massekhtot and 371 chapters, and covering the Kavanah.

Thus, the number of massekhtot in this work is 112, corresponding to the numerical value of the sacred name יבק; and the number of chapters 547, equal to the numerical value of Ricchi's name, עמנואל חי ריקי, plus twelve, the number of its letters.

The sources for this work besides the Zohar are mostly Isaac Luria's and Hayyim Vital's writings, of which the "Sefer haGilgulim," "Kanfei Yonah," and "Shulchan Arukh" may be particularly mentioned. Ricchi drew also from other kabbalists. The "Olam Katon" was separately edited by Eliezer b. Moses, with a commentary of his own, entitled "Derekh ha-Melekh" (Dyhernfurth, 1753).
