= Derech Hashem =

1740s text by Moshe Chaim Luzzatto

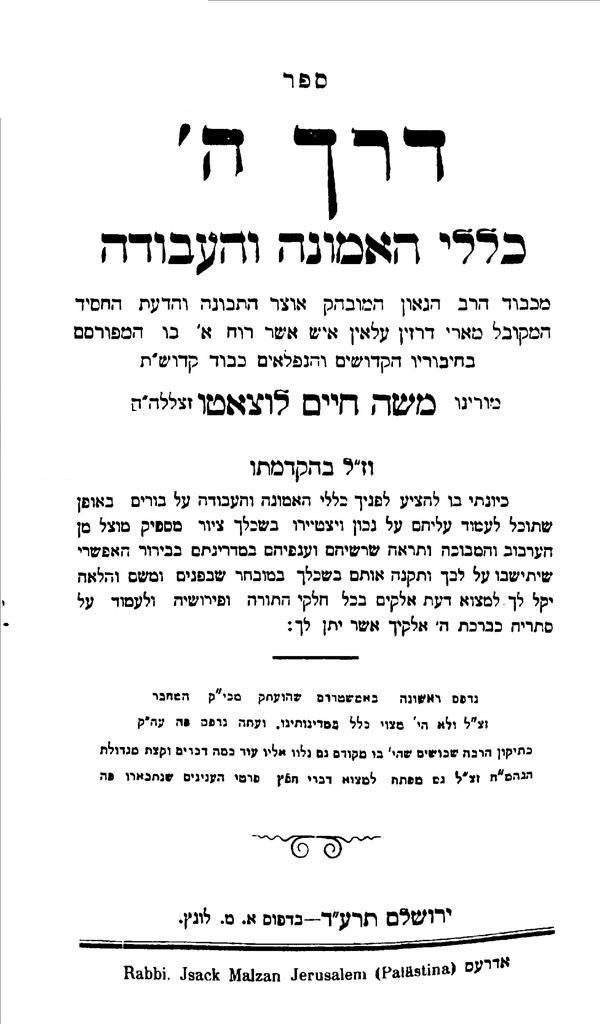

Derech HaShem (The "Way of the Name") is a philosophical text written around 1736 by Rabbi Moshe Chaim Luzzatto.

== Contents<2> ==
=== Introduction ===
==== Part One ====
1. On the Creator
2. On the Purpose of Creation
3. On Mankind
4. On Human Responsibility
5. On the Spiritual Realm

==== Part Two ====
1. On Divine Providence in General
2. On Mankind in This World
3. On Personal Providence
4. On Israel and the Nations
5. On How Providence Works
6. On the System of Providence
7. On the Influence of the Stars
8. On Specific Modes of Providence

==== Part Three ====
1. On the Soul and Its Activities
2. On Divine Names and Witchcraft
3. On Divine Inspiration and Prophecy
4. On the Prophetic Experience
5. On Moshe's Unique Status

==== Part Four ====
1. On Divine Service
2. On Torah Study
3. On Love and Fear of God
4. On the Sh'ma and Its Blessings
5. On Prayer
6. On the Daily Order of Prayer
7. On Divine Service and the Calendar
8. On Seasonal Commandments
9. On Blessings
