= Midrash Hashkem =

Midrash Hashkem, also known as Midrash ve-Hizhir, is an aggadic and halachic midrash on the Pentateuch. It roughly follows the Torah from Exodus 8 to Numbers 20.

== Names ==
The midrash begins with a haggadic passage, which, belonging to Exodus 8:16 ("Vayomer hashkem ba-boker"), is found also in the earlier editions of Tanḥuma. The work was called "Hashkem" after the second word in this introductory sentence. Other authors called the midrash "VeHizhir," after the standing formula "VeHizhir haḲadosh barukh Hu," with which nearly all the pericopes in the midrash as now extant begin, and which is occasionally found at the beginning of a new section in the middle of the pericope. No one, however, quotes Hashkem and VeHizhir together as two different works.

== Contents ==
The first part of the Munich codex, after which the work was published by Freimann, under the title "VeHizhir", is doubtless somewhat defective. In the editions as well as in the codex this first passage, as well as the beginning of the following haggadic passage to Exodus 9:22, included in both Tanḥumas in the pericope "Va'era," is erroneously combined with a passage to Exodus 10:21—which also, perhaps, was taken from Tanḥuma—as belonging to the pericope "Bo".

This midrash took its halakhic portion from the Talmudic sources, the baraita on the erection of the Tabernacle, the She'eltot of Aḥa of Shabḥa, and the Halakot Gedolot, the She'eltot also being arranged according to the one-year cycle and being in its minor portions especially dependent on Tanḥuma. "The halakic expositions refer in 'Bo' to tefillin; in 'Beshallaḥ' to the rest on the Sabbath and eruv; in 'Yitro' to the commandments connected with the Decalogue; in 'Mishpaṭim' to the requirements of the judge; in 'Terumah' to the priestly gift; in 'Vayaḳhel' to the Sabbath; in 'Vayiḳra' to slaughtering; in 'Tzav' to the oath and the testimony of witnesses; in 'Shemini' to the 'dine ṭerefah'; in 'Tazria' 'to the 'dine yoledot'; in 'Meẓora' 'to the 'dine ṭum'ah'; in 'Aḥare' and 'Ḳedoshim' to forbidden marriages; in 'Beḥuḳḳotai' to vows; in 'Bemidbar' to the 'dine bekor'".

The aggadic portions are those mentioned above; also part 1, pp. 4a et seq. (from the Mekhilta); pp. 19a et seq. (from Tanḥuma, ed. S. Buber, and Mekhilta); p. 23a (from Mekhilta); p. 76b (after Tanḥuma); pp. 115a et seq., 121b (after Tanḥuma); p. 128b (after Tanḥuma, ed. Buber); part 2, pp. 34b et seq. (from Vayikra Rabbah 9); p. 128b (from Sifra), etc.

The midrash, which ends in the edition with the halakhic passage (to Numbers 5:11 et seq.)והזהיר הקב"ה שכל מי שמקניה לאשתו וכו', is probably defective at the end as well as in some other passages (following the manuscript); it cannot be determined whether it covered the Book of Numbers only, or also Deuteronomy. Several passages quoted by the old authors, but not found in the edition, may have been included in the missing portion of the work. Zunz, who closely examined the manuscript after which the edition was subsequently printed, concluded that VeHizhir and Hashkem are one and the same work. This view must be unhesitatingly accepted. The fact that some passages quoted by the old authors from the Midrash Hashkem do not correspond entirely with the edition, and that some are not found in it at all, does not prove that these are two different works (as Freimann, Buber, and Grünhut assume). The differences are not important, and both differences and omissions may be due to variations in the copies or to different revisions.

The work is quoted as early as the mid-11th century as a recognized authority. Zunz dates its authorship to the tenth century.

The assumption of the editor expressed even in the title, that Ḥefeẓ Alluf is the author of the work, lacks support.

The quotations from Hashkem by the old authors have been collected by Grünhut.
