= Rod-and-ring symbol =

Ancient Mesopotamian symbol

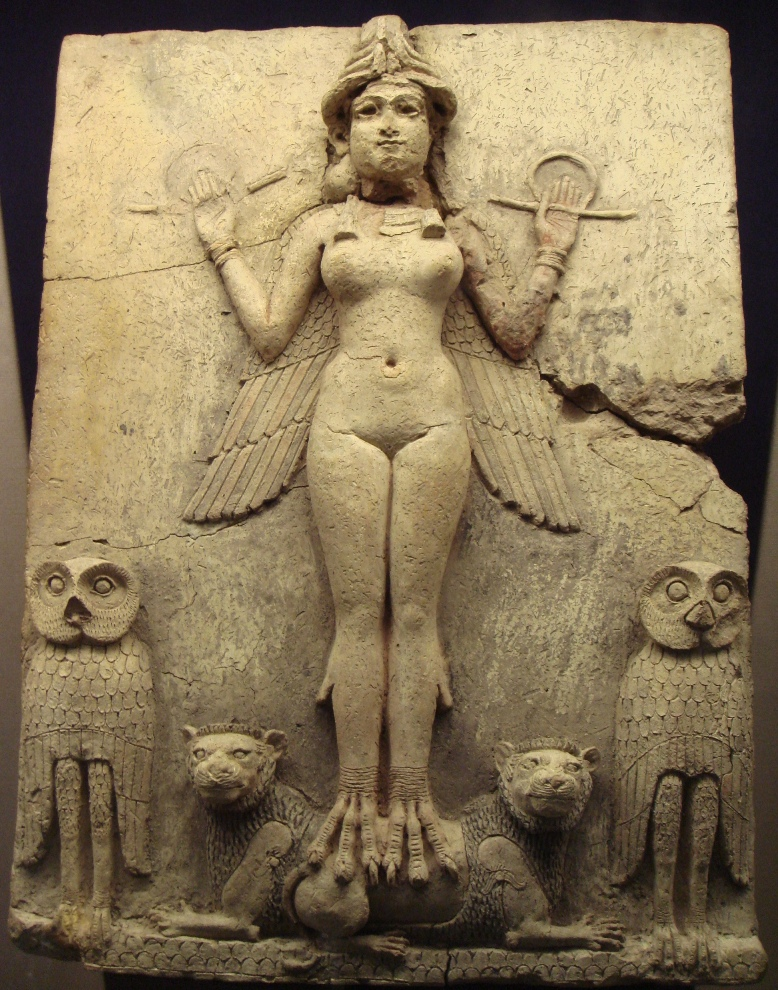
The goddess of the Burney relief presenting a rod-and-ring symbol in each hand.

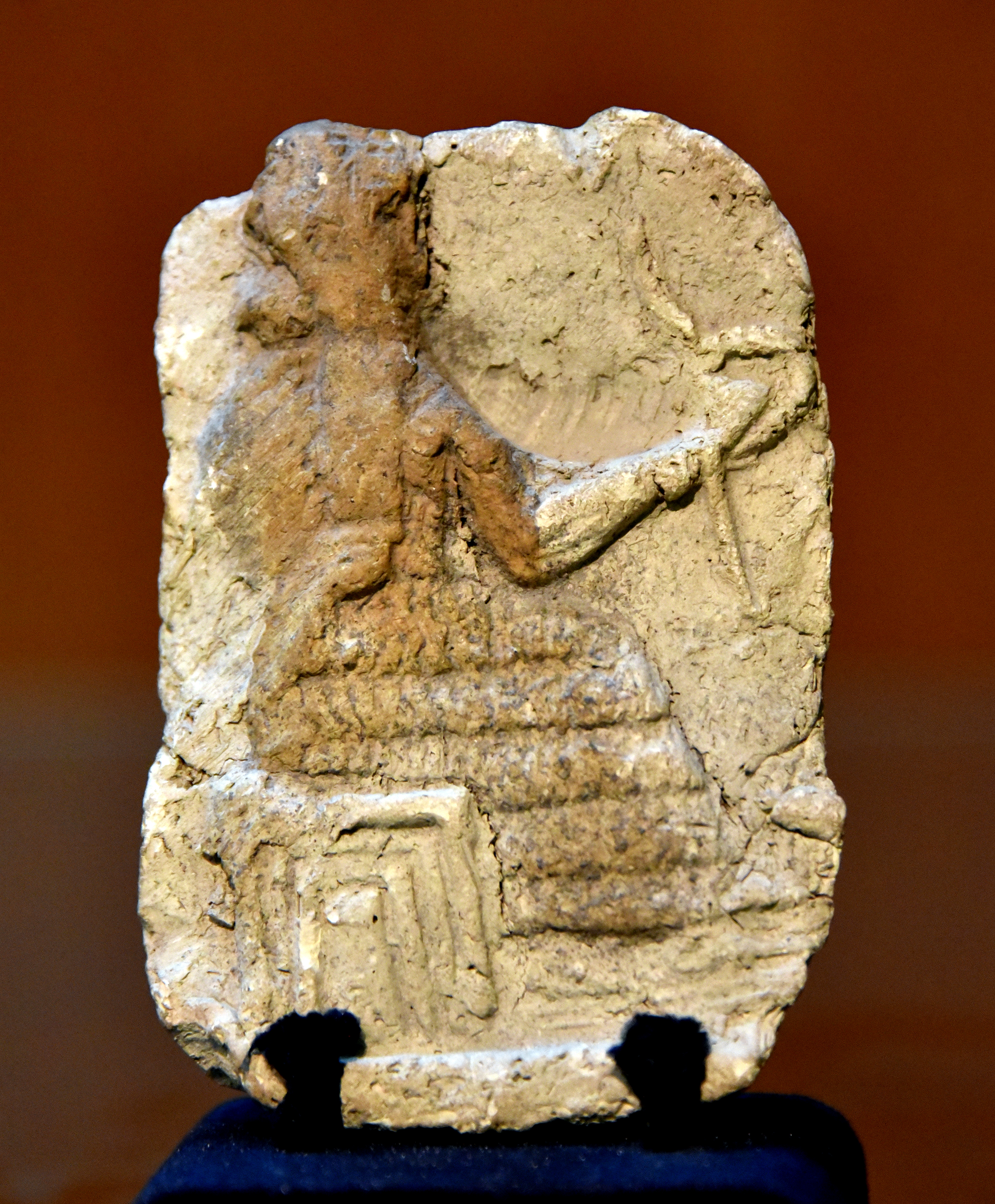
Mesopotamian deity sitting on a stool, holding the rod-and-ring symbol. Old-Babylonian fired clay plaque from Southern Mesopotamia, Iraq

The rod-and-ring symbol is a symbol that is depicted on Mesopotamian stelas, cylinder seals, and reliefs. It is held by a god or goddess and in most cases is being offered to a king who is standing, often making a sacrifice, or otherwise showing respect. The symbol dates from the Third Dynasty of Ur to the Neo-Assyrian period, and is commonly explained as a coil of measuring string and a yardstick. Other theories are that they are a shepherd's crook and a nose rope, or that the ring is no rope at all.

The best known example of the symbol is seen on the Code of Hammurabi stela. The symbol is also illustrated in the Investiture of Zimri-Lim painted at the palace of Mari. The most elaborate depiction is found on the Ur-Nammu-stela, where the winding of the cords has been detailed by the sculptor. This has also been described as a "staff and a chaplet of beads". There is discussion whether the Ur-Nammu-stela is showing the same thing.

== Scepter, throne, and ring: Enuma Elish ==
The myth of Inanna's descent to the nether world describes how the goddess dresses and prepares herself: "She held the lapis-lazuli measuring rod and measuring line in her hand."

In tablet IV of the Enuma Elish, the rod and ring symbol is referenced as:

"They rejoiced, and they did homage unto him, saying, "Marduk is King!"
They bestowed upon him the scepter, and the throne, and the ring.
They gave him an invincible weaponry which overwhelmeth the foe."

== Symbols that appear similar ==
- The Egyptian shen ring has a close resemblance.
- The Greek goddess Nike uses a different type of investiture symbol for the victor in the sporting races, a wreath of laurel, or a wreath of olive branches, but she is depicted with a ring, a rigid circle.
- The Faravahar, the symbol of Zoroastrianism, also holds a ring.
- The Egyptian Ankh has a vaguely similar form and is also depicted in hands of gods.
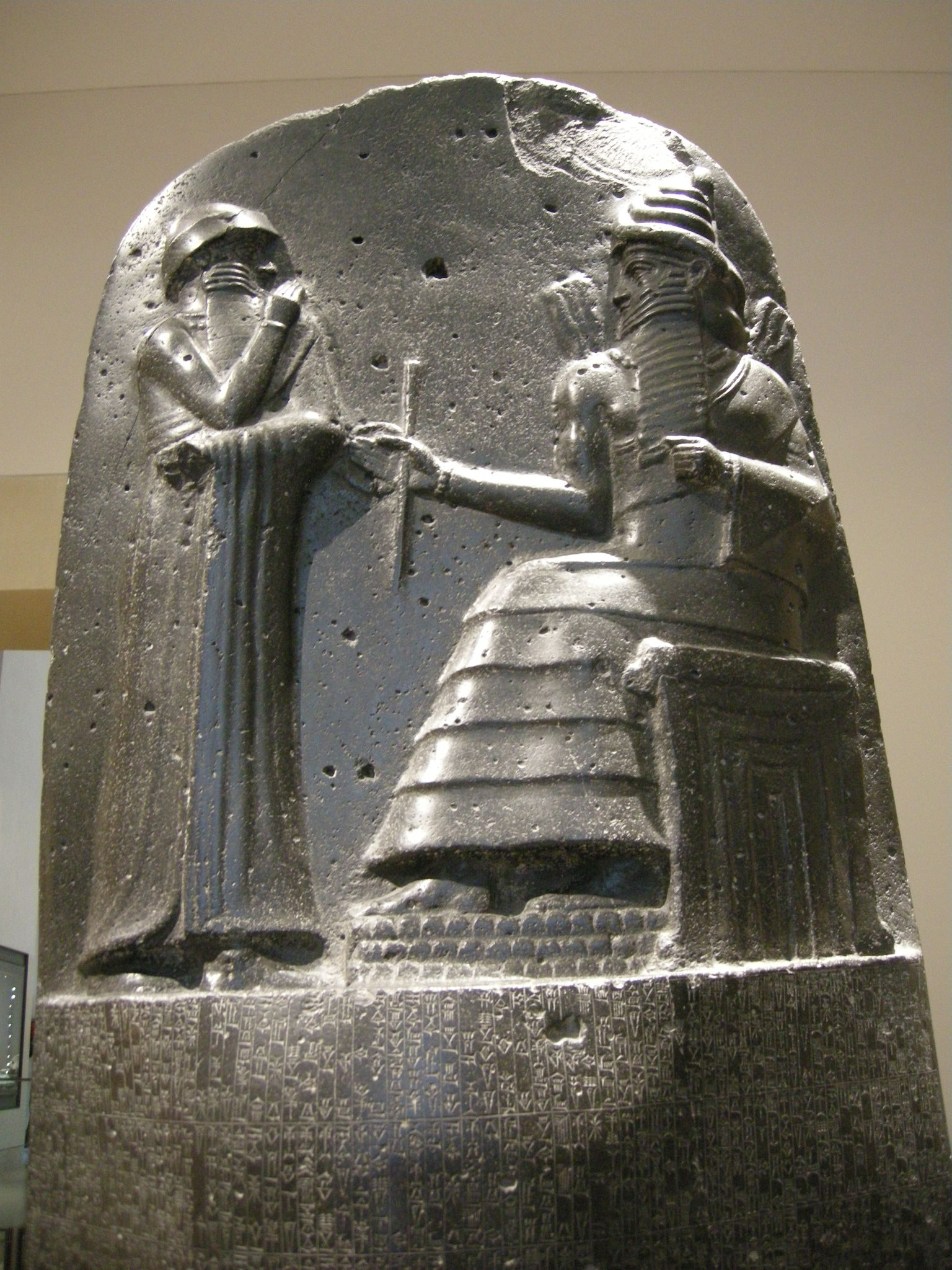
Scene detail of Code of Hammurabi monumental stela

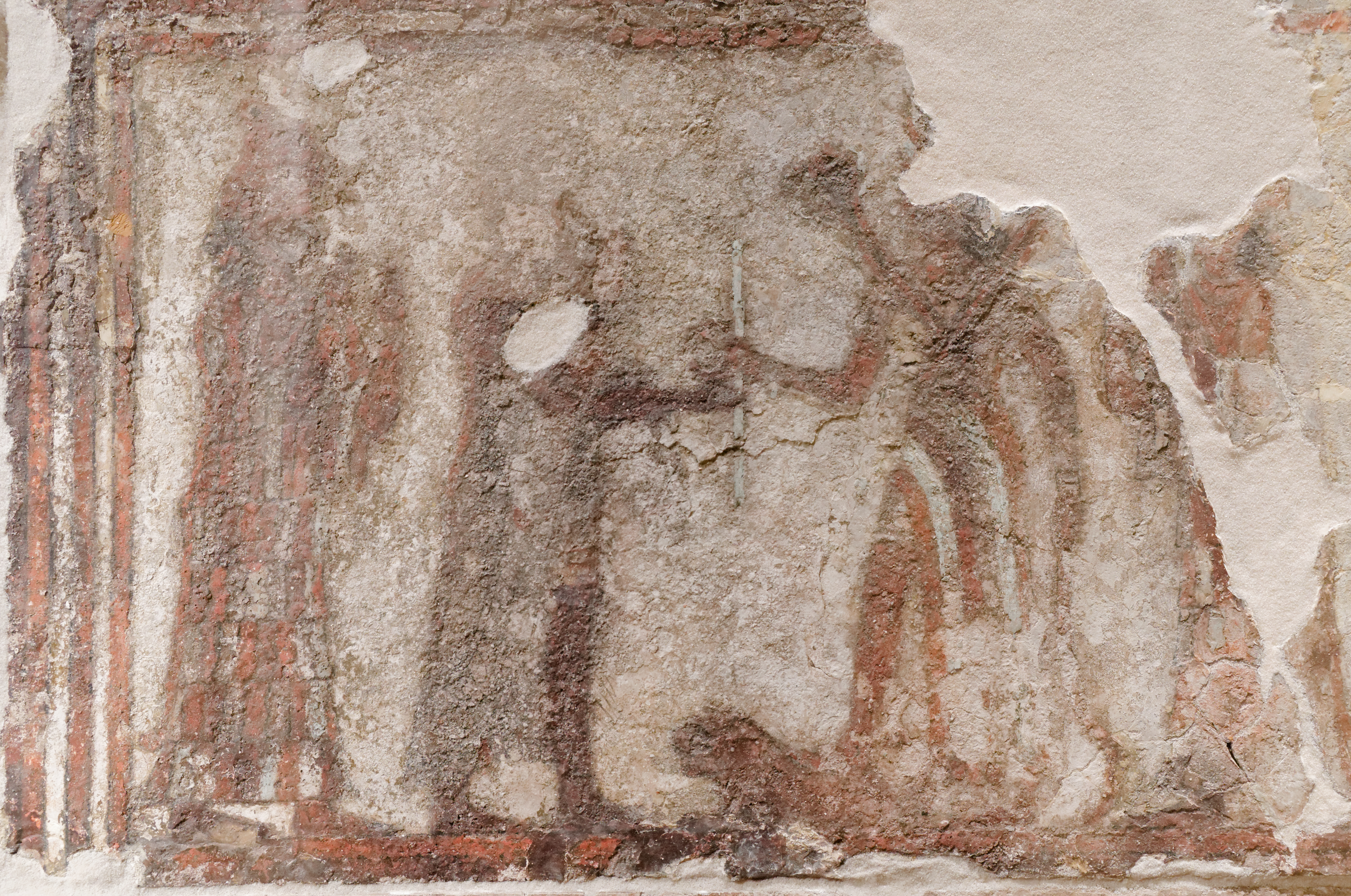
Zimri-Lim receives the rod-and-ring in his investiture
