= Emil Kraeling =

American Lutheran biblical scholar and Aramaist

Emil Gottlieb Heinrich Kraeling (1892–1973) was an American Lutheran biblical scholar and Aramaist. He came from an extended German-American Lutheran family. Kraeling attended the Lutheran Seminary of Philadelphia from 1909 to 1912, and then was associate professor of Old Testament at Union Seminary. Among his best known works was a study of Job The Book of the Ways of God. In 1937 he published papers in agreement with Henri Frankfort identifying a woman in the Burney Relief as the Lilith of later Jewish mythology.

== Selected works ==
- The Old Testament since the Reformation
- Our Living Bible co-authored with Michael Avi Yonah. Old Testament text by M. Avi-Yonah. New Testament text by Emil G. Kraeling. With illustrations.
- The Brooklyn Museum Aramaic Papyri: New Documents Of The Fifth Century B. C. From The Jewish Colony Of Elephantine
- The Prophets
- The Disciples
- I Have Kept the Faith; The Life of the Apostle Paul
- Aram and Israel: The Arameans in Syria and Mesopotamia (1918)
- The Four Gospels (Clarified New Testament) (1962)
- The Book of the Ways of God (1938)

Editor:

- Rand McNally Historical Atlas of the Holy Land
