= Head of a Bear =

Circa 1480 drawing by Leonardo da Vinci

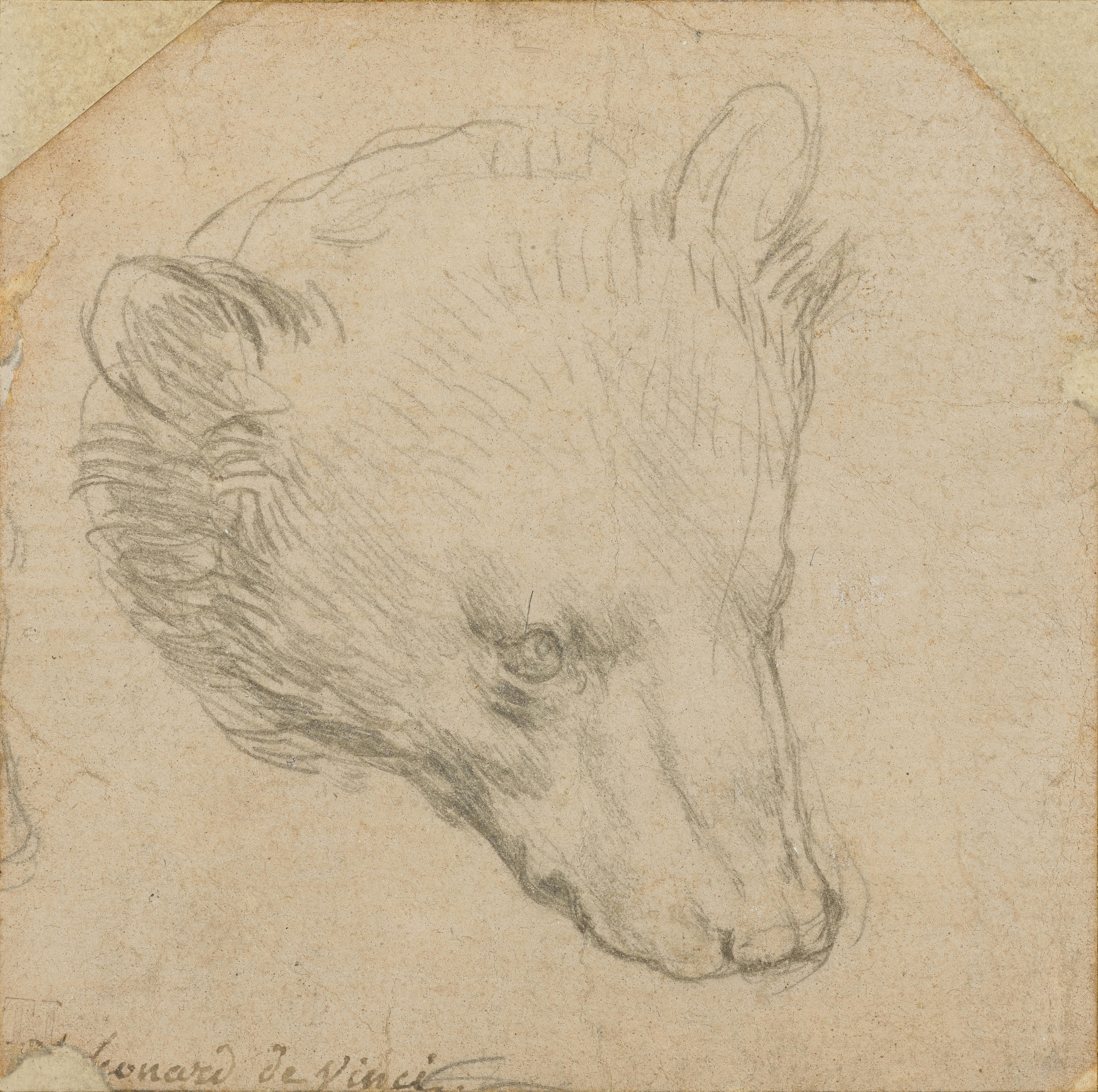
- Artist: Leonardo da Vinci
- Year: c. 1480
- Medium: silverpoint pencil on pink-beige paper
- Dimensions: 7 cm × 7 cm (2.8 in × 2.8 in)

Head of a Bear is a drawing study made by Leonardo da Vinci circa 1480. It is small in scale, measuring only 7 by 7 centimetres (2.8 in × 2.8 in), and is rendered in silverpoint pencil. It is thought to be part of a study of animals that Leonardo made in this period. The artist may have drawn upon this study when painting the head of the animal in his Lady with an Ermine of 1489–1490. The drawing was owned by the British painter Sir Thomas Lawrence in the 18th century and by the art collector Norman Colville in the early 20th century. The American billionaire Thomas Kaplan purchased the drawing in 2008. It sold in 2021 for a total of £8.8 million, a record for a drawing by Leonardo.

== Description ==
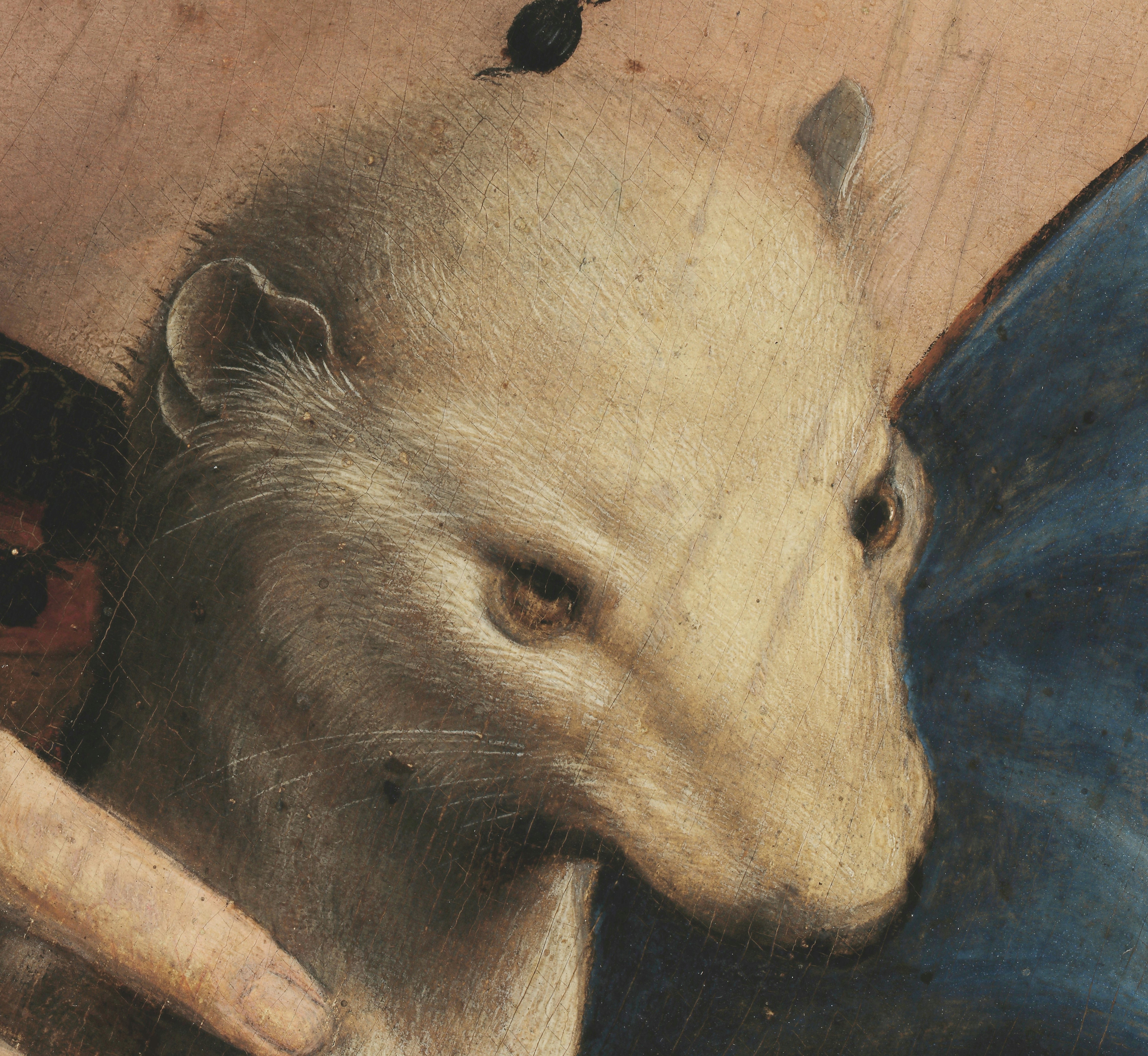
Cropped and rotated head of the ermine in Leonardo's Lady with an Ermine

Head of a Bear is thought to have been executed by a young Leonardo da Vinci (b. 1452) circa 1480. It is a close-up drawing of a bear's head on a 7-by-7-centimetre (2.8 in × 2.8 in) piece of pink-beige paper. Its size has led it to be described as "a Post-it Note Leonardo". It is drawn with a silverpoint pencil. Silverpointing is a technique that Leonardo learnt in the workshop of Andrea del Verrocchio. It is an unforgiving medium as the marks made by the silver pencil are very difficult to erase.

The drawing is thought to be part of a series of studies Leonardo made into the anatomy and movements of bears and a comparison he made between ursine and human anatomy. Bears were common in parts of Tuscany at that time, though it is likely that Leonardo made the drawing from a captive bear. It is one of four surviving drawings of animals from this period in Leonardo's life, the others being A Bear Walking (in the Metropolitan Museum of Art), Studies of a Dog's Paw (in the Scottish National Gallery) and Two Studies of a Cat and One of a Dog (in the British Museum). These works possibly all came from the same sketchbook.

Head of a Bear was executed shortly before Leonardo left Florence for Milan. At Milan he painted Lady with an Ermine (1489–1490), a depiction of Cecilia Gallerani, the mistress of the Duke of Milan. It is known that Gallerani did not pose with an actual ermine (stoat), so Leonardo may have drawn upon his earlier work. The ermine gazes in a similar direction and its head structure, with small eyes and a cylindrical muzzle, is comparable to that of Head of a Bear. The ermine depicted is larger than such animals are in real life.

== Later history ==
By the 18th century Head of a Bear was in the collection of the British painter Sir Thomas Lawrence. Upon Lawrence's death in 1830 it passed to his art dealer Samuel Woodburn. In 1860 Woodburn sold the drawing at Christie's auction house in London for £2.50. Woodburn sold Studies of a Dog's Paw in the same sale. Head of a Bear entered the collection of Norman Colville by the early 20th century. It was exhibited for the first time in 1937 and was included in Bernard Berenson's 1938 book The Drawings of the Florentine Painters.

In 2008 the work was purchased by the American billionaire Thomas Kaplan. He purchased it on the basis of a faxed copy sent to him by London-based dealer Johnny van Haeften. Kaplan was principally a collector of Dutch Old Master paintings, but van Haeften suggested the Leonardo drawing to him as Kaplan's son was named Leonardo. Kaplan allowed the drawing to be exhibited alongside the Lady with an Ermine at the National Gallery in 2011 and at the Long Museum in Shanghai. On 8 July 2021 Kaplan sold Head of a Bear at Christie's in London. It was given an estimate of £8–12 million but sold for £7.5 m (£8.8m with fees). It attracted only one bid, placed in person by a young American man and woman, who also purchased an autographed manuscript by Sir Isaac Newton for £1.7 million (including fees). The auction house's only comment on the buyer's identity was that it was a family trust. Head of a Bear remains one of only eight known Leonardo drawings in private hands (excluding those in the British Royal Collection and the Devonshire Collection). The 2021 sale was the first of a Leonardo drawing since Horse and Rider was sold, also at Christie's, in 2001 for £8.1 million (including fees). Head of a Bear set a new record for a Leonardo drawing, which had previously been set by the 2001 sale.

== See also ==
- List of works by Leonardo da Vinci
