= Sydney Burney =

British art dealer

- Occupation: art dealer

Sydney Bernard Burney CBE (20 March 1878 – 3 January 1951) was a British art and antiquities dealer and collector based in London. He was responsible for organizing an exhibition of African art in 1933 in which African art was depicted as equal to the art of other cultures. He donated a limestone Etruscan urn to the British Museum.

== Questionable Artefacts ==
Burney owned the crystal skull, later known as the Mitchell-Hedges skull, which was later sold by his son at auction at Sotheby's. He sold an artefact known as the Burney Relief, later called "Queen of the Night," when it was acquired by the British Museum in 2003. The authenticity of this artefact has been questioned by some on stylistic grounds, though most reject this assertion.
