= Norman Colville =

British Army officer and art collector

- Born: Norman Robert Colville; 11 September 1893; Jerviston House, Motherwell, Lanarkshire, Scotland
- Died: 26 August 1974 (aged 80)
- Education: University of Cambridge

Captain Norman Robert Colville MC (11 September 1893 – 26 August 1974) was a British Army officer and art collector. He left the University of Cambridge to join the Argyll and Sutherland Highlanders during the First World War. Colville received the Military Cross in 1915 for bravery in making a number of reconnaissances of the Hohenzollern Redoubt. After the war he joined his family's steel-making firm, but moved to Cornwall for health reasons, having been badly gassed during the war. He acquired Penheale Manor which he had extended by Sir Edwin Lutyens to form a house and gallery for his extensive art collection. Colville held works by Leonardo da Vinci, Raphael and Fra Bartolomeo as well as a large collection of Near and Middle Eastern artefacts, including the Burney Relief.

== Early life and army service ==
Norman Robert Colville was born at Jerviston House near Motherwell, Lanarkshire, Scotland, in 1893. He was educated at Fettes College in Edinburgh and Clare College, Cambridge, at which he matriculated in 1913. On 15 August 1914, shortly after the outbreak of the First World War, he was appointed a second lieutenant in the British Army. This appointment was confirmed on 5 September 1914 as being to the 10th (Service) Battalion of the Argyll and Sutherland Highlanders (Princess Louise's). Colville served on the Western Front and, on 4 November 1915 received the Military Cross for "conspicuous gallantry and ability". The award was made for his actions during reconnaissance of the German fortification, the Hohenzollern Redoubt. These were made on 7 August and 8 & 9 September 1915, in the lead up to the Battle of Loos and on 9 October in advance of the Actions of the Hohenzollern Redoubt. On the latter occasion, though stunned by the near miss of a shell, he completed his reconnaissance, making a sketch showing the layout of the redoubt and its barbed wire. Colville was promoted to lieutenant on 29 July 1916 with seniority of 10 August 1915.

After the end of the war from 1919, Colville lived at Garrion Tower, Cambusnethan, in Lanarkshire. In 1920, he joined the board of directors of the family firm David Colville & Sons, the largest Scottish steel maker, and in the same year was elected a member of the Iron and Steel Institute. Colville relinquished his army commission on 1 September 1921 and was granted the rank of captain.

== Penheale and art collection ==
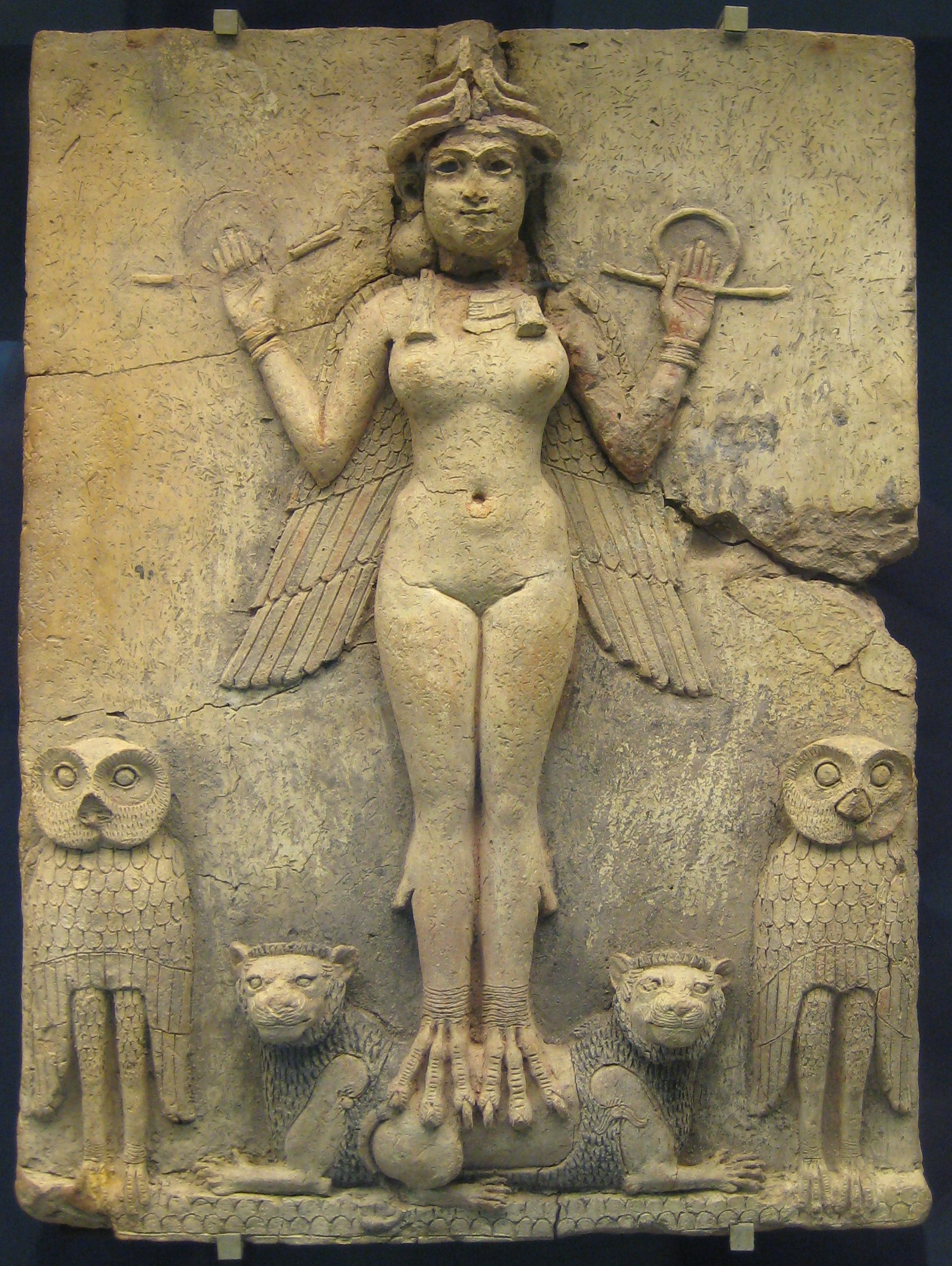
The Burney Relief

Colville had been badly gassed during the war and was advised to move to the south of England for health reasons. He purchased Penheale Manor in east Cornwall. This was a medieval structure rebuilt in the 16th century that was in an almost ruinous state. Colville commissioned the architect Sir Edwin Lutyens to extend and restore Penheale Manor to restore the manor as a home for him and his increasing collection of art and furniture. The renovation works included installation of a formal garden by Gertrude Jekyll. Colville occupied Penheale from 1920.

Colville's collection included drawings by the Old Masters and English-made furniture, including a 14th-century chest owned by Richard de Bury. Individual pieces included a Roman cityscape by Giovanni Paolo, which is now in the collection of the National Gallery, Raphael's Head of a Muse and Head of a Bear, a c. 1480 drawing by Leonardo da Vinci. The latter became one of the last few of the several hundred extant da Vinci drawings in private ownership. Colville also owned two c. 1500 works by Fra Bartolomeo: A Kneeling Angel and The Virgin and Child Surrounded by Saints and Angels. Colville had a particular interest in works of the Near and Middle East. His collection, much of which was later acquired by the British Museum, included the Babylonian Burney Relief (also known as the Queen of the Night).

== Later years ==
Colville was appointed High Sheriff of Cornwall on 15 February 1940, remaining in office for a year. He lived with his third wife Diana in Kensington Square, London, and died in 1974. His records relating to the Penheale estate are held by the Plymouth Archives.
