= Hapax legomenon =

Word appearing only once in a text or record

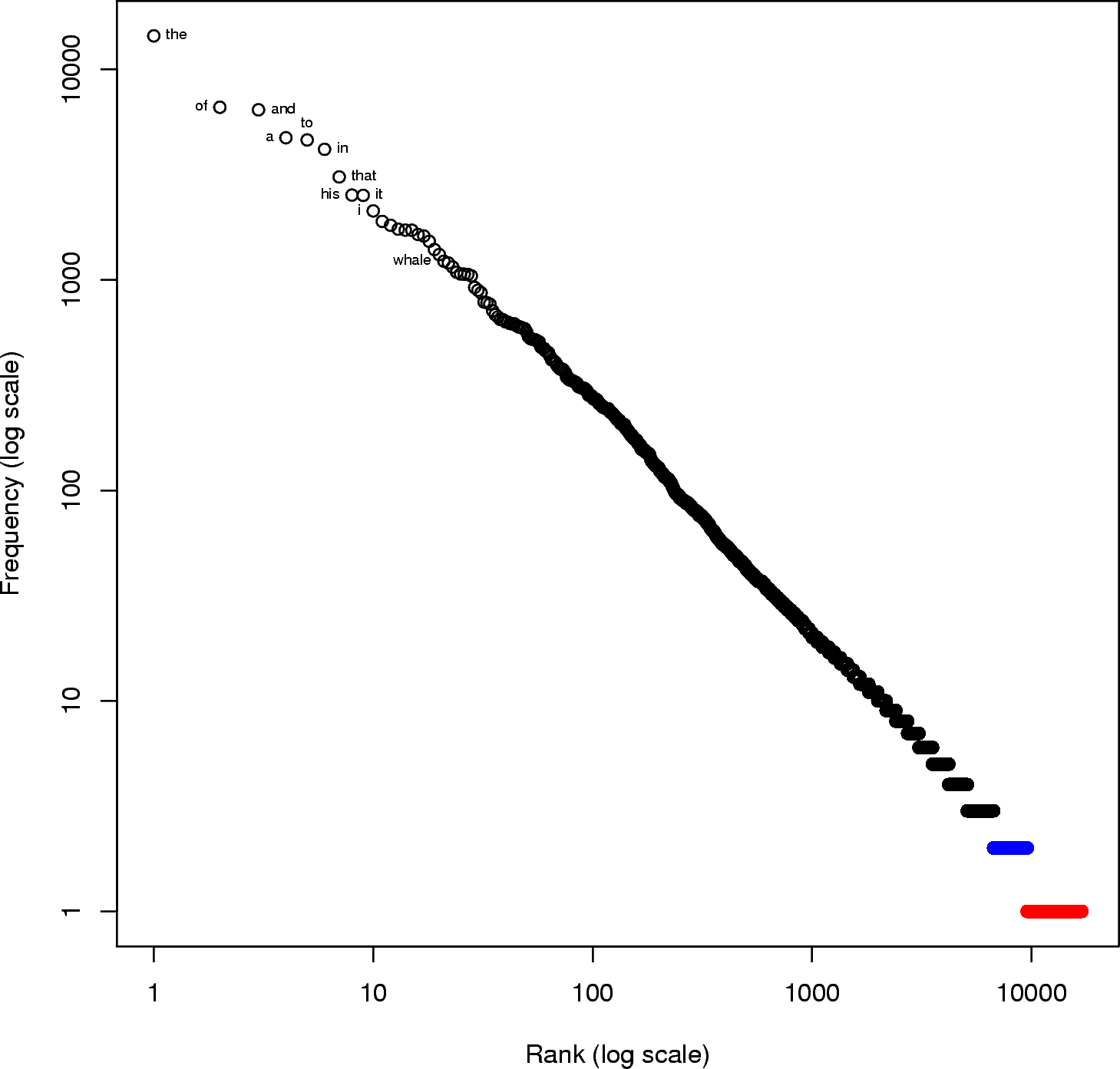
Rank-frequency plot for words in the novel Moby-Dick. About 44% of the distinct set of words in this novel, such as "matrimonial", occur only once, and so are hapax legomena (red). About 17%, such as "dexterity", appear twice (so-called dis legomena, in blue). Zipf's law predicts that the words in this plot should approximate a straight line with slope −1.

In corpus linguistics, a hapax legomenon (/ˈhæpəks ləˈɡɒmənɒn/ also /ˈhæpæks/ or /ˈheɪpæks/; pl. hapax legomena; sometimes abbreviated to hapax, plural hapaxes) is a word or an expression that occurs only once within a context: either in the written record of an entire language, in the works of an author, or in a single text. The term is also sometimes used to describe a word that occurs in just one of an author's works but more than once in that particular work. Hapax legomenon is a transliteration of Greek ἅπαξ λεγόμενον, meaning "said once".

The related terms dis legomenon, tris legomenon, and tetrakis legomenon respectively (/ˈdɪs/, /ˈtrɪs/, /ˈtɛtrəkɪs/) refer to double, triple, or quadruple occurrences, but are far less commonly used.

Hapax legomena are quite common, as predicted by Zipf's law, which states that the frequency of any word in a corpus is inversely proportional to its rank in the frequency table. For large corpora, about 40% to 60% of the words are hapax legomena, and another 10% to 15% are dis legomena. Thus, in the Brown Corpus of American English, about half of the 50,000 distinct words are hapax legomena within that corpus.

Hapax legomenon refers to the appearance of a word or an expression in a body of text, not to either its origin or its prevalence in speech. It thus differs from a nonce word, which may never be recorded, may find currency and may be widely recorded, or may appear several times in the work which coins it, and so on.

== Significance ==
Workman's count of hapax legomena in the Epistles of the New Testament

Workman's count of hapax legomena in Shakespeare's plays

Hapax legomena in ancient texts are usually difficult to decipher, since it is easier to infer meaning from multiple contexts than from just one. For example, many of the remaining undeciphered Mayan glyphs are hapax legomena, and Biblical (particularly Hebrew; see § Hebrew) hapax legomena sometimes pose problems in translation. Hapax legomena also pose challenges in natural language processing.

Some scholars consider Hapax legomena useful in determining the authorship of written works. P. N. Harrison, in The Problem of the Pastoral Epistles (1921) made hapax legomena popular among Bible scholars, when he argued that there are considerably more of them in the three Pastoral Epistles than in other Pauline Epistles. He argued that the number of hapax legomena in a putative author's corpus indicates his or her vocabulary and is characteristic of the author as an individual.

Harrison's theory has faded in significance due to a number of problems raised by other scholars. For example, in 1896, W. P. Workman found the following numbers of hapax legomena in each Pauline Epistle:

Pauline Epistle	Hapax legomena
Romans	113
I Corinthians	110
II Corinthians	99
Galatians	34
Ephesians	43
Philippians	41
Colossians	38
I Thessalonians	23
II Thessalonians	11
I Timothy	82
II Timothy	53
Titus	33
Philemon	5

At first glance, the last three totals (for the Pastoral Epistles) are not out of line with the others. To take account of the varying length of the epistles, Workman also calculated the average number of hapax legomena per page of the Greek text, which ranged from 3.6 to 13, as summarized in the diagram on the right. Although the Pastoral Epistles have more hapax legomena per page, Workman found the differences to be moderate in comparison to the variation among other Epistles. This was reinforced when Workman looked at several plays by Shakespeare, which showed similar variations (from 3.4 to 10.4 per page of Irving's one-volume edition), as summarized in the second diagram on the right.

Apart from author identity, there are several other factors that can explain the number of hapax legomena in a work:

- text length: this directly affects the expected number and percentage of hapax legomena; the brevity of the Pastoral Epistles also makes any statistical analysis problematic.
- text topic: if the author writes on different subjects, of course many subject-specific words will occur only in limited contexts.
- text audience: if the author is writing to a peer rather than a student, or their spouse rather than their employer, again quite different vocabulary will appear.
- time: over the course of years, both the language and an author's knowledge and use of language will change.

In the particular case of the Pastoral Epistles, all of these variables are quite different from those in the rest of the Pauline corpus, and hapax legomena are no longer widely accepted as strong indicators of authorship; those who reject Pauline authorship of the Pastorals rely on other arguments.

There are also subjective questions over whether two forms amount to "the same word": dog vs. dogs, clue vs. clueless, sign vs. signature; many other gray cases also arise. The Jewish Encyclopedia points out that, although there are 1,500 hapaxes in the Hebrew Bible, only about 400 are not obviously related to other attested word forms.

A final difficulty with the use of hapax legomena for authorship determination is that there is considerable variation among works known to be by a single author, and disparate authors often show similar values. In other words, hapax legomena are not a reliable indicator. Authorship studies now usually use a wide range of measures to look for patterns rather than relying upon single measurements.

== Computer science ==
In the fields of computational linguistics and natural language processing (NLP), esp. corpus linguistics and machine-learned NLP, it is common to disregard hapax legomena (and sometimes other infrequent words), as they are likely to have little value for computational techniques. This disregard has the added benefit of significantly reducing the memory use of an application, since, by Zipf's law, many words are hapax legomena.

== Examples ==
The following are some examples of hapax legomena in languages or corpora.

=== Arabic ===
In the Qurʾān:

- The proper nouns Iram (Q 89:7, Iram of the Pillars), Bābil (Q 2:102, Babylon), Bakka(t) (Q 3:96, Bakkah), Jibt (Q 4:51), Ramaḍān (Q 2:185, Ramadan), ar-Rūm (Q 30:2, Byzantine Empire), Tasnīm (Q 83:27), Qurayš (Q 106:1, Quraysh), Majūs (Q 22:17, Magian/Zoroastrian), Mārūt (Q 2:102, Harut and Marut), Makka(t) (Q 48:24, Mecca), Nasr (Q 71:23), (Ḏū) an-Nūn (Q 21:87) and Hārūt (Q 2:102, Harut and Marut) occur only once.
- zanjabīl (زَنْجَبِيل – ginger) is a Qurʾānic hapax (Q 76:17).
- zamharīr (زَمْهَرِيرًۭ) is a Qurʾānic hapax (Q 76:13), usually glossed as referring to extreme cold.
- The epitheton ornans aṣ-ṣamad (الصَّمَد – the One besought) is a Qurʾānic hapax (Q 112:2).
- ṭūd (طُودْ - mountain) is a Qurʾānic hapax (Q 26:63).

=== Chinese and Japanese ===
Classical Chinese and Japanese literature contains many Chinese characters that feature only once in the corpus, and their meaning and pronunciation has often been lost. Known in Japanese as kogo (孤語), literally "lonely characters", these can be considered a type of hapax legomenon. For example, the Classic of Poetry (c. 1000 BC) uses the character 篪 exactly once in the verse 「伯氏吹塤, 仲氏吹篪」, and it was only through the discovery of a description by Guo Pu (276–324 AD) that the character could be associated with a specific type of ancient flute.

=== English ===
The word "honorificabilitudinitatibus" as found in the first edition of William Shakespeare's play Love's Labour's Lost

It is fairly common for authors to "coin" new words to convey a particular meaning or for the sake of entertainment, without any suggestion that they are "proper" words. For example, P.G. Wodehouse and Lewis Carroll frequently coined novel words. Indexy, below, appears to be an example of this.

- Flother, as a synonym for snowflake, is a hapax legomenon of written English found in a manuscript entitled The XI Pains of Hell (c. 1275).
- Honorificabilitudinitatibus is a hapax legomenon of Shakespeare's works, coming from Erasmus' Adagia
- Indexy, in Bram Stoker's Dracula, used as an adjective to describe a situational state with no other further use in the language: "If that man had been an ordinary lunatic I would have taken my chance of trusting him; but he seems so mixed up with the Count in an indexy kind of way that I am afraid of doing anything wrong by helping his fads."
- Manticratic, meaning "of the rule by the Prophet's family or clan", was apparently invented by T. E. Lawrence and appears once in Seven Pillars of Wisdom.
- Nortelrye, a word for "education", occurs only once in Chaucer's The Reeve's Tale.
- Sassigassity, perhaps with the meaning of "audacity", occurs only once in Dickens's short story "A Christmas Tree".
- Slæpwerigne, "sleep-weary", occurs exactly once in the Old English corpus, in the Exeter Book. There is debate over whether it means "weary with sleep" or "weary for sleep".

=== German ===
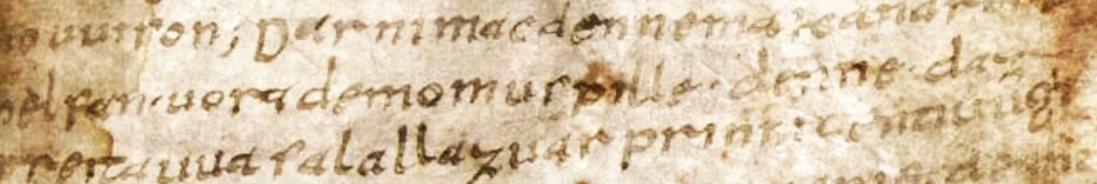
Muspilli line 57: "dar nimac denne mak andremo helfan uora demo muspille" (Bavarian State Library Clm 14098, f. 121r)

- The name of the 9th-century poem Muspilli is a back-formation from "muspille", Old High German hapax legomenon of unclear meaning only found in this text (see Muspilli § Etymology for discussion).

=== Ancient Greek ===
According to classical scholar Clyde Pharr, "the Iliad has 1,097 hapax legomena, while the Odyssey has 868". Others have defined the term differently, however, and count as few as 303 in the Iliad and 191 in the Odyssey.

- panaōrios (παναώριος), ancient Greek for "very untimely", is one of many words that occur only once in the Iliad.
- The Greek New Testament contains 686 local hapax legomena, which are sometimes called "New Testament hapaxes". 62 of these occur in 1 Peter and 54 occur in 2 Peter.
- Epiousion, often translated into English as ″daily″ in the Lord's Prayer in Matthew 6:11 and Luke 11:3, occurs nowhere else in all of the known ancient Greek literature.
- The word aphedrōn (ἀφεδρών) "latrine" in the Greek New Testament occurs only twice, in Matthew 15:17 and Mark 7:19, but since it is widely considered that the writer of the Gospel of Matthew used the Gospel of Mark as a source, it may be regarded as a hapax legomenon. It was mistakenly translated as "bowel", until an inscription from the Lex de astynomis Pergamenorum ("Law of the town clerks of Pergamon") confirmed it meant "latrine".

=== Hebrew ===
The number of distinct hapax legomena in the Hebrew Bible is 1,480 (out of a total of 8,679 distinct words used). However, due to Hebrew roots, suffixes and prefixes, only 400 are "true" hapax legomena. A full list can be seen at the Jewish Encyclopedia entry for "Hapax Legomena".

Some examples include:

- Akut (אקוט – fought), only appears once in the Hebrew Bible, in Psalm 95:10.
- Atzei Gopher (עֲצֵי-גֹפֶר – Gopher wood) is mentioned once in the Bible, in Genesis 6:14, in the instruction to make Noah's ark "of gopher wood". Because of its single appearance, its literal meaning is lost. Gopher is simply a transliteration, although scholars tentatively suggest that the intended wood is cypress.
- Gvina (גבינה – cheese) is a hapax legomenon of Biblical Hebrew, found only in Job 10:10. The word has become extremely common in modern Hebrew.
- Zechuchith (זכוכית) is a hapax legomenon of Biblical Hebrew, found only in Job 28:17. The word derives from the root זכה z-ch-h, meaning clear/transparent and refers to glass or crystal. In Modern Hebrew, it is used for "glass".
- Lilith (לילית) occurs once in the Hebrew Bible, in Isaiah 34:14, which describes the desolation of Edom. It is translated several ways. The following verse, Isaiah 34:15, contains another hapax legomenon, the word qippoz (קִפוֹז), which has been translated as owl, arrow snake, and sand partridge in different versions of the text.

=== Hungarian ===
- The word ímés is mentioned in István Székely's 1559 book titled Chronica ez vilagnac ieles dolgairol. According to the theory of literary historian Géza Szentmártoni Szabó, the word means 'half-asleep'.

=== Irish ===
- chomneibi, an adjective of unknown meaning describing a lath, only appears in Triads of Ireland #169 (prior to 850 AD).

=== Italian ===
- Ramogna (possibly meaning "hope") is mentioned only once in Italian literature, specifically in Dante's Divina Commedia (Purgatorio XI, 25).
- The verb attuia appears once in the Commedia (Purgatorio XXXIII, 48). The meaning is contested but usually interpreted as "darkens" or "impedes". Some manuscripts give the alternative hapax accuia instead.
- Trasumanar is another hapax legomenon mentioned in the Commedia (Paradiso I, 70, translated as "Passing beyond the human" by Mandelbaum).
- Ultrafilosofia, which means "beyond the philosophy" appears in Leopardi's Zibaldone (Zibaldone 114–115 – June, 7th 1820).

=== Latin ===
- Deproeliantis, a participle of the word deproelior, which means "to fight fiercely" or "to struggle violently", appears only in line 11 of Horace's Ode 1.9.
- Mactatu, singular ablative of mactatus, meaning "because of the killing". It occurs only in De rerum natura by Lucretius.
- Mnemosynum, presumably meaning a keepsake or aide-memoire, appears only in Poem 12 of Catullus's Carmina.
- Scortillum, a diminutive form meaning "little prostitute", occurs only in Poem 10 of Catullus's Carmina, line 3.
- Terricrepo, an adjective apparently referring to a thunderous oratory method, occurs only in Book 8 of Augustine's Confessions.
- Romanitas, a noun signifying "Romanism" or "the Roman way" or "the Roman manner", appears only in Tertullian's de Pallio.
- Arepo is a potential proper name only found in the Sator square. It may be derived by spelling opera backwards.
- Eoigena, an adjective referred to the sun and signifying "one born in the east", appears only in an epigraph found in Castellammare di Stabia (the ancient Stabiae).

=== Persian ===
- Paland (پلند, "Poland"; transliterated into Gurmukhi as ਪਿਲੰਦੇ) appears only once in the fourth section of the Hikaaitaan, a work of Persian-language literature from Punjab only found in the Dasam Granth. This word appears nowhere else in either Punjabi or Persian literature, and is therefore considered to be valuable in deducing the currently disputed authenticity of the Dasam Granth.

=== Slavic ===
- Vytol (вытол) is a hapax legomenon of the known corpus of the Medieval Russian birch bark manuscripts. The word occurs in inscription no. 600 from Novgorod, dated ca. 1220–1240, in the context "[the] vytol has been caught" (вытоло изловили, vytolo izlovili). According to Andrey Zaliznyak, the word does not occur anywhere else, and its meaning is not known. Various interpretations, such as a personal name or the social status of a person, have been proposed.

=== Spanish ===
- Atafea is a hapax legomenon appearing in a proverb reported by Blasco de Garay in the 16th century ("uno muere de atafea y otro la desea"). The meaning of the word was not known, and was initially interpreted to mean satiety. Modern etymologists link it to the north-African Arab term tafaya/attatfíha, which refers to a stew of onion and coriander.
- Esi, believed to derive from the Latin conjunction etsi "although", appears only once in Álvaro de Luna's Virtuosas e claras mugeres (1446).

== In popular culture ==
- Hapax legomenon as a term became briefly prominent in Britain following the 2014–15 University Challenge Final, after videos went viral of Gonville and Caius student Ted Loveday swiftly giving it as a correct answer when presenter Jeremy Paxman had only managed to ask "Meaning 'said only once', what two-word Greek term denotes a word...".

== See also ==
- Googlewhack – Contest to find a Google Search query that returns a single result
- Nonce word – Lexeme created for a single occasion
- Protologism – New word that has not yet been independently published
- Word list
