= Qippoz =

Hapax legomenon in the Hebrew Bible

Qippoz, also transliterated qippôz, qîppôz, and qippōz, (Hebrew: קִפוֹז) is a term used in the Book of Isaiah in the Hebrew Bible. It is a hapax legomenon, appearing only once in the Bible, and its meaning is uncertain. It appears in Isaiah 34:15, in the context of the judgment of Edom, where animals associated with desolation are said to inhabit the ruined Edomite cities. Many English Bible translations, including the King James Version, translate it as an owl, but other translations have been offered. More modern interpretations translate it as an arrow snake, including the New King James Version and New Jewish Publication Society of America Tanakh. Due to the uncertainty of the proper translation, the qippoz features in debates about whether demons are referenced in the Old Testament.

== Context ==
The word qippoz is a Hebrew-language hapax legomenon in the Bible, appearing only once through the entire text, in Isaiah 34:15. This section of the Book of Isaiah is concerned with the judgment of Edom, a nation that was supposed to be brotherly with the Israelites, but instead became their enemy. Historically, and likely contemporary with the writing of Isaiah, the Edomites may have been involved in attacks on Judea in an alliance with the Babylonians in the 6th century BCE. Theologically, it is invoked as a symbolic antagonism harkening back to the progenitors of Judea and Edom: Jacob and Esau. The Book of Isaiah singles out Edom as having earned the wrath of God, which will result in its complete destruction.

Verses 11 through 17 provide a list of creatures that will inhabit the ruined fortresses and destroyed wasteland of Edom. The identities of many of these creatures is contested, and various translations exist. The listed creatures are believed to be both wild animals and demons. Many of the same creatures are also listed in the Bible's description of the destruction of Babylon, and this passage may have been modelled off of it. The qippoz is listed among these creatures. There is debate among scholars and translators about the identity of many of these creatures. The name Lilith, which appears before qippoz, is regarded by some as a seductive demoness that features in other parts of Jewish mythology, including the Dead Sea Scrolls, and has been translated variously as "night-hag" and "lamia." The King James Version translates Lilith as a type of owl.

Judit M. Stein, arguing that demons are not referenced at all in the Old Testament, regards Lilith and the rest of the creatures — including qippoz — exclusively reference real animals.

== Translations ==
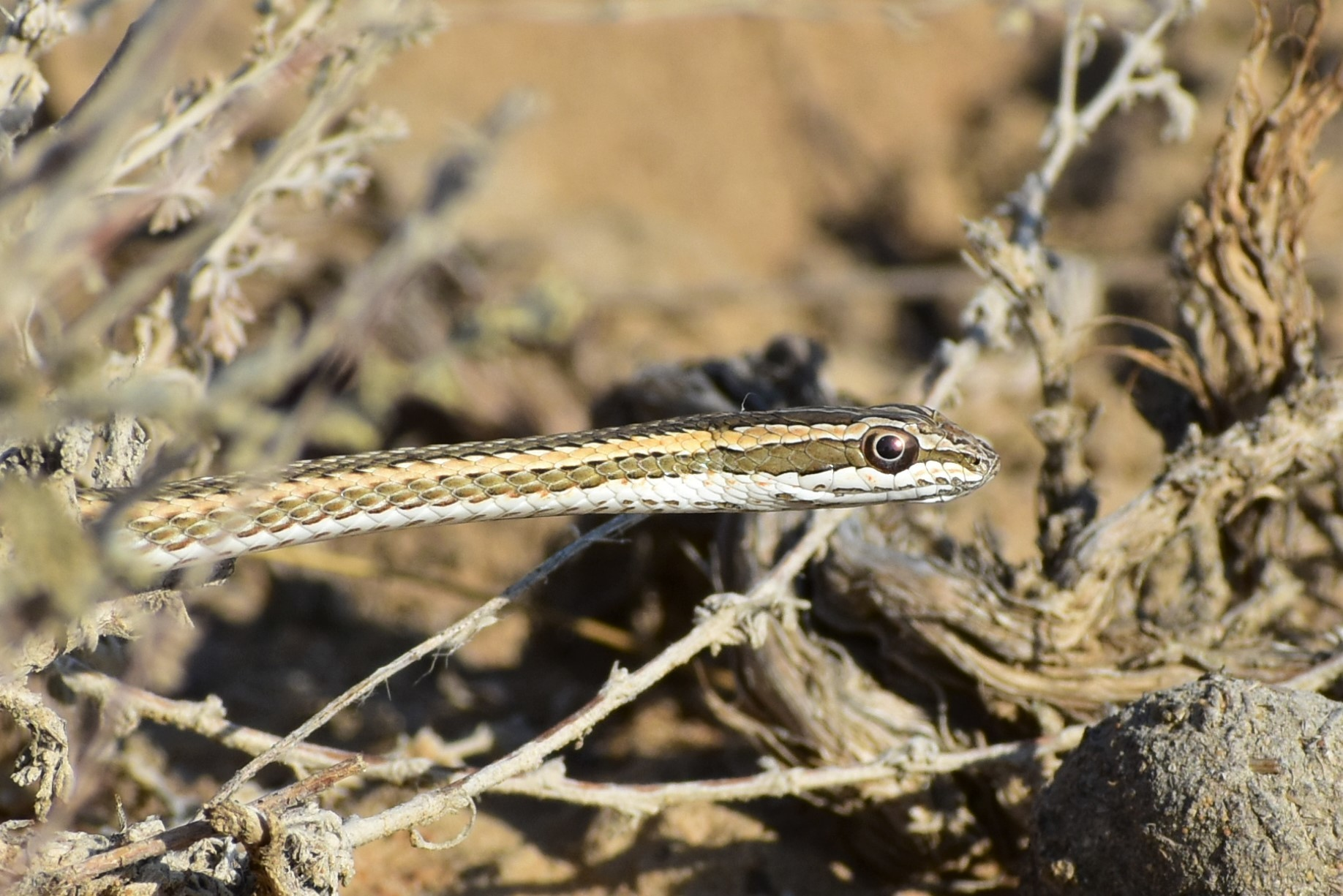
Arrow snake (Psammophis lineolatus)

The Septuagint lists mammals for all of the creatures in the verses. Qippoz was read as related to qippod and translated as hedgehog. The Latin Vulgate also uses the hedgehog translation. This reading has not been accepted as accurate by scholars, and other translations have been offered, including the short-eared owl and bustard. Qippod has been translated differently in Strong's Concordance as bittern.

The King James Version renders it as "great owl," and the passage as "There shall the great owl make her nest, and lay, and hatch, and gather under her shadow. Qippoz is not the only word that the KJV translates as owl. Words such as yanshuf, lilit, kos, and bat-ya'anah are also translated as various kinds of owl. Reverend William Houghton, a naturalist and clergyman, regarded this interpretation as "probably correctly" rendered. The New International Version, the Restoration Study Bible, and the Complete Jewish Bible all follow the owl translation.

Samuel Bochart translated qippoz as "arrow-snake," an interpretation adopted by nineteenth century British theologians John Kitto and William Lindsay Alexander. The Brown-Driver-Briggs Old Testament lexicon also suggested "arrow-snake" as the correct interpretation. Some modern English Bible translations have followed this lead, including the New Jerusalem Bible, which reads "snake" and the New American Standard Bible, which reads "tree snake." The New Jewish Publication Society of America Tanakh uses the arrow-snake translation. The NKJV also reads "arrow snake."

Strong's Concordance states the word comes from an unused Hebrew root meaning to spring forward, as an arrow snake darting for its prey, and also lists "great owl" as a translation.

G. R. Driver rejected both the owl and snake translations, suggesting instead "sand-partridge," which lives in dry and desolate regions, following his interpretation of the Hebrew root relating to the word "hop," an activity undertaken by partridges. The New English Bible uses the sand-partridge translation. Judit M. Blair suggests that a generic "desert bird" is more apt, given the lack of any more specific evidence.

== See also ==
- Bible errata
- Demons in Christianity
- Lilith in popular culture
- Serpents in the Bible
