= Lilith =

Female figure in Near Eastern mythology

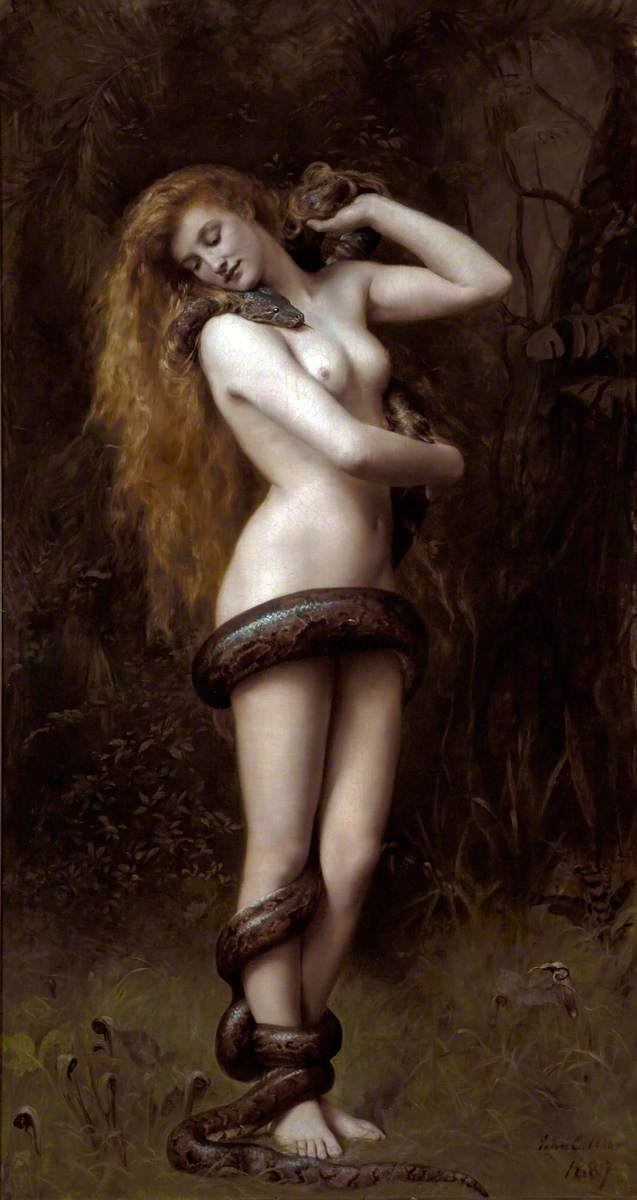
Lilith (1887) by John Collier

Lilith (/ˈlɪlɪθ/; Hebrew: לִילִית, romanized: Līlīṯ; also spelled Lilit or Lilis) is a feminine figure in late-antique Mesopotamian and Jewish mythology. Lilith does not appear in the Hebrew Bible or any other biblical source, although the Hebrew word lilit appears in the Book of Isaiah, specifically in Isaiah 34:14. The meaning of this word is debated by scholars with interpretations ranging from a primordial she-demon to a night bird. The King James translation renders the term in this verse as "screech-owl". Based on medieval Jewish folklore, Lilith is said to have fled from the Garden of Eden because she did not want to submit to Adam.

The earliest known mention of Lilith is in the Dead Sea Scrolls (4Q510-11), and afterwards in Mandaean and Jewish sources from late antiquity (300 AD onward), in historiolas – incantations that incorporate a short mythic story – that give partial descriptions of her. She is mentioned in the Babylonian Talmud (at Eruvin 100b, Niddah 24b, Shabbat 151b, Bava Batra 73a), and in the Zohar § Leviticus 19a as "a hot fiery female who first cohabited with man". Some rabbinic authorities, including Maimonides and Menachem Meiri, reject the existence of Lilith.

== History ==
In some Jewish folklore, such as the Alphabet of Sirach (c. 700–1000 AD), Lilith appears as Adam's first wife, who was created at the same time and from the same clay as Adam. (Note: Compare Genesis 1:27 (this contrasts with Eve, who was created from one of Adam's ribs).) The legend of Lilith developed extensively during the Middle Ages, in the tradition of Aggadah, the Zohar, and Jewish mysticism.

Interpretations of Lilith found in later Jewish materials are plentiful, but little information has survived relating to the Sumerian, Assyrian, and Babylonian views of the lilu class of demons. Some scholars, such as Lowell K. Handy, hold the view that though Lilith derives from Mesopotamian demonology, evidence of the Hebrew Lilith being present in the sources frequently cited – the Sumerian Gilgamesh fragment, the Babylonian Burney Relief and the Syrian amulet from Arslan-Tash – is scant, if present at all.

In Hebrew-language texts, the term lilith or lilit (translated as "night creatures", "night monster", "night hag", or "screech owl") first occurs in a list of animals in Isaiah 34. The Isaiah 34:14 Lilith reference does not appear in most common Bible translations such as KJV and NIV. Commentators and interpreters often envision the figure of Lilith as a dangerous demon of the night, who is sexually wanton, and who steals babies in the darkness. Currently there is no scholarly consensus, with some adhering to the animalistic interpretation, whereas others claim 34:14 is referencing a literal demon or a category of demons falling under the specification of "lilith". Historically, certain prominent Jewish rabbis in Talmudic texts feared the likes of liliths, some to such an extent that they recommended men not sleep in a home alone, as any who do would be "seized by Lilith." Jewish incantation bowls and amulets from Mesopotamia from the first to the eighth centuries identify Lilith as a female demon and provide the first visual depictions of her. The said amulets were often symbolic divorce papers, warding off a given lilith that was thought to be haunting one's house or family.

== Etymology and origins ==
In the Akkadian language of Assyria and Babylonia, the terms lilû and lilītu refer to spirits, and are etymologically connected to Sumerian líl. Some uses of līlītu are listed in the Assyrian Dictionary of the Oriental Institute of the University of Chicago (CAD, 1956, L.190), in Wolfram von Soden's Akkadisches Handwörterbuch (AHw, p. 553), and Reallexikon der Assyriologie (RLA, p. 47).

The Sumerian líl root has no etymological relation to Akkadian līlu, "evening", and an unlikely connection with the biblical lilith appearing in Isaiah 34:14, which might derive from laylah, "night", and is thought to be a night bird by modern scholars such as Judit M. Blair.

The name Lilith seems related to the masculine Akkadian word lilû and its female variants lilītu and ardat lilî. In Mesopotamian religion according to the cuneiform texts of Sumer, Assyria, and Babylonia, lilû are a class of demonic spirits, consisting of adults (and ardat-lilî of adolescents) who died before they could bear children or get married. Lilith in Aramaic sources is believed to be a conflation of lilītu/ardat-lilî and Lamaštu, as she is both a succubus, and also a threat to children, the traditional role of Lamaštu in Babylonia. Without any distinctions between demons and ghosts in Jewish magic, the difference between the Mesopotamian ghosts and Lamaštu was blurred.

Lamaštu has herself been equated with the lilû class in Babylonian sources; with the lilītu in the An = Anum ša amēli, the lilû and ardat-lilî in incantations, embodying thus all of the same aspects shared with Lilith, and as such is a demonic forerunner to her.

== Disproven theories ==
=== The spirit in the tree in the Gilgamesh cycle ===
Samuel Noah Kramer (1932, published 1938) and C. J. Gadd (1933) translated ki-sikil-lil-la-ke as "Lilith" in Tablet XII of the Epic of Gilgamesh dated c. 600 BC. Tablet XII is not part of the Epic of Gilgamesh, but is a later Assyrian Akkadian translation of the latter part of the Sumerian Epic of Gilgamesh. The ki-sikil-lil-la-ke is associated with a serpent and a zu bird. (Note: Kramer translates the zu as "owl", but most often it is translated as "eagle", "vulture", or "bird of prey".) In Gilgamesh, Enkidu, and the Netherworld, a huluppu tree grows in Inanna's garden in Uruk, whose wood she plans to use to build a new throne. After ten years of growth, she comes to harvest it and finds a serpent living at its base, a Zu bird raising young in its crown, and that a ki-sikil-lil-la-ke made a house in its trunk. Gilgamesh is said to have killed the snake, and then the zu bird flew away to the mountains with its young, while the ki-sikil-lil-la-ke fearfully destroys its house and runs for the forest.

Identification of the ki-sikil-lil-la-ke as Lilith is stated in the Dictionary of Deities and Demons in the Bible (1999). Suggested translations for the Tablet XII spirit in the tree include ki-sikil as "sacred place", lil as "spirit", and lil-la-ke as "water spirit", but also simply "owl", given that the lil is building a home in the trunk of the tree. In modern scholarship, ki-sikil-lil-la-ke is understood as the Sumerian equivalent of the Akkadian ardat lilî, and accepted translations include phantom maid, demon-maiden and demon-girl. A connection between the Gilgamesh ki-sikil-lil-la-ke and the Jewish Lilith was rejected on textual grounds by Sergio Ribichini (1978).

=== The bird-footed woman in the Burney Relief ===
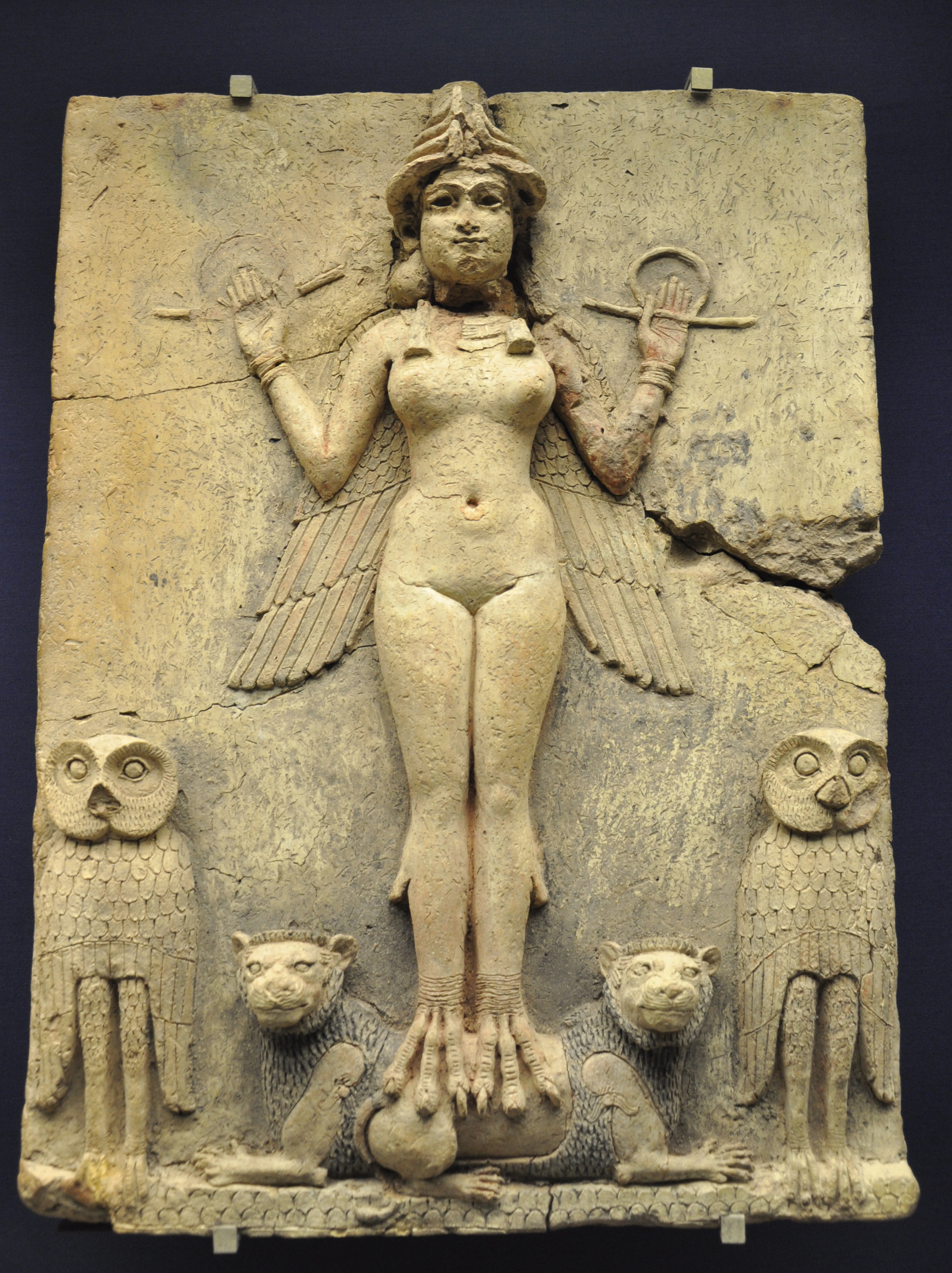
Burney Relief, Babylon (1800–1750 BC)

Gadd's translation of the Gilgamesh fragment was used by Henri Frankfort (1937) and Emil Kraeling (1937) to support identification of a woman with wings and bird-feet in the disputed Burney Relief as related to Lilith. Frankfort and Kraeling identified the figure in the relief with Lilith. Today, the identification of the Burney Relief with Lilith is questioned. Modern research has identified the figure as one of the main goddesses of the Mesopotamian pantheons, most probably Ereshkigal. But the figure is more generally identified as the goddess of love and war: Thorkild Jacobsen identified the figure as Inanna in an analysis based on the existence of symbols and attributes commonly recognized to the goddess and on textual evidence.

=== The Arslan Tash amulets ===
The Arslan Tash amulets are limestone plaques discovered in 1933 at Arslan Tash, the authenticity of which is disputed. William F. Albright, Theodor H. Gaster, and others, accepted the amulets as a pre-Jewish source which shows that the name Lilith already existed in the 7th century BC but Torczyner (1947) identified the amulets as a later Jewish source.

=== Hand/prostitute of Inanna-Ištar ===
Hurwitz, while quoting Langdon, refers to the Lilītu as a prostitute of Ištar. According to him, Ištar sends her unmarried and seductive prostitute Lilitu out into the streets and fields in order to lead men astray, and this is why Lilith is also called "the hand of Inanna". This rumour persisted in other writings of the modern period.

Hurwitz cites Tammuz and Ishtar, which itself cites Babyloniaca and Babylonian Liturgies.

In Babyloniaca, Langdon presents a fragmentary tablet, in which ardat-lilî appears as the hand of Inanna. The "hand of Inanna/Ištar" is contemporarily understood as a disease, and does not have the meaning of "handmaiden" that got assigned to it later. This tablet, Sm. 49+752, is paralleled by SBTU II No. 6 and 7 where it's translated as "The maiden (is one) whom the <hand of Ishtar>-disease treated harshly in the nest".

In the introduction of "Incantation in the "House of Light", Against the Harlot of Innini" of Babylonian Liturgies, Langdon analyses the behaviour of the ardat-lilî and lilītu demons, and refers to them as prostitutes, but the text itself has no mention of them. A modern translation of the text refers to an ardat, a young prostitute of Inanna, not an ardat-lilî, a demon maiden.

Lilith then appears in none of the above ancient fragments, and even ardat-lilî/lilītu isn't a prostitute or handmaiden of Inanna. The prostitute is a young woman (ardat), and the "hand of Inanna" is a disease that affected an ardat-lilî. Cuneiform and Mesopotamian scholarship was not well understood, so the terms ardat, ardat-lilî, lilītu and Lilith were sometimes used interchangeably.

== In the Hebrew Bible ==
The word lilit (or lilith) appears only once in the Hebrew Bible, in a prophecy regarding the fate of Edom. It appears in the middle of a list of eight nouns, most of which appear elsewhere in the biblical texts (so are better documented) and are known to refer to creatures. However lilit and qippoz appear only in this list, making them hapax legomena with unclear meaning. The interpretation of lilit by scholars and translators is often guided by a decision about the complete list of eight creatures as a whole. (Note: See The animals mentioned in the Bible Henry Chichester Hart 1888, and more modern sources; also entries Brown Driver Briggs Hebrew Lexicon for tsiyyim, 'iyyim, sayir, liylith, qippowz and dayah.)

The New American Bible translation of this passage in Isaiah 34 reads:

(12) Her nobles shall be no more, nor shall kings be proclaimed there; all her princes are gone. (13) Her castles shall be overgrown with thorns, her fortresses with thistles and briers. She shall become an abode for jackals and a haunt for ostriches. (14) Wildcats shall meet with desert beasts, satyrs shall call to one another; There shall the Lilith repose, and find for herself a place to rest. (15) There the hoot owl shall nest and lay eggs, hatch them out and gather them in her shadow; There shall the kites assemble, none shall be missing its mate. (16) Look in the book of the LORD and read: No one of these shall be lacking, For the mouth of the LORD has ordered it, and His spirit shall gather them there. (17) It is He who casts the lot for them, and with His hands He marks off their shares of her; They shall possess her forever, and dwell there from generation to generation.

=== Hebrew text ===
In the Masoretic Text:

,וּפָגְשׁוּ צִיִּים אֶת-אִיִּים, וְשָׂעִיר עַל-רֵעֵהוּ יִקְרָא; אַךְ-שָׁם הִרְגִּיעָה לִּילִית, וּמָצְאָה לָהּ מָנוֹח

up̄āḡəšu ṣiyyim eṯ-ʾiyyim, wəśāʿir ʿal-rēʿēhu yiqrā; ʾaḵ-šam hirgiʿā liliṯ, umāṣʾā lāh mānoḥ

34:14 "And shall-meet wildcats with jackals
the goat he-calls his- fellow
lilit (lilith) she-rests and she-finds rest (Note: מנוח, manoaḥ, used for birds as Noah's dove, Gen.8:9 and also humans as Israel, Deut.28:65; Naomi, Ruth 3:1.)
34:15 there she-shall-nest the great-owl, and she-lays-(eggs), and she-hatches, and she-gathers under her-shadow:
hawks [kites, gledes] also they-gather, every one with its mate.

In the Dead Sea Scrolls, among the 19 fragments of Isaiah found at Qumran, the Great Isaiah Scroll (1Q1Isa) in 34:14 renders the creature as plural liliyyot (or liliyyoth).

Eberhard Schrader (1875) and Moritz Abraham Levy (1855) suggest that Lilith was a demon of the night, known also by the Jewish exiles in Babylon. Schrader's and Levy's view is therefore partly dependent on a later dating of Deutero-Isaiah to the 6th century BC and the presence of Jews in Baghdad in the Neo-Babylonian Empire, which would coincide with the possible references to the Lilītu in Babylonian demonology. However, this view is challenged by Judit M. Blair, who argues that the context indicates unclean animals.

=== Greek version ===
The Septuagint translates both the reference to Lilith and the word for jackals or "wild beasts of the island" within the same verse into Greek as onokentauros, apparently assuming them to refer to the same creatures and omitting "wildcats/wild beasts of the desert." Under this reading, instead of the wildcats or desert beasts meeting with the jackals or island beasts, the goat or "satyr" crying "to his fellow" and lilith or "screech owl" resting "there", it is the goat or "satyr", translated as daimonia "demons", and the jackals or island beasts "onocentaurs" meeting with each other and crying "one to the other" and the latter resting there. (Note: 34:14 καὶ συναντήσουσιν δαιμόνια ὀνοκενταύροις καὶ βοήσουσιν ἕτερος πρὸς τὸν ἕτερον ἐκεῖ ἀναπαύσονται ὀνοκένταυροι εὗρον γὰρ αὑτοῖς ἀνάπαυσιν Translation: And daemons shall meet with onocentaurs, and they shall cry one to the other: there shall the onocentaurs rest, having found for themselves [a place of] rest.)

=== Latin Bible ===
The early 5th-century Vulgate translated the same word as lamia.

et occurrent daemonia onocentauris et pilosus clamabit alter ad alterum ibi cubavit lamia et invenit sibi requiem

— Isaiah (Isaias Propheta) 34.14, Vulgate

The translation is, "And demons shall meet with monsters, and one hairy one shall cry out to another; there the lamia has lain down and found rest for herself".

=== English versions ===
Wycliffe's Bible (1395) preserves the Latin rendering lamia:

Isa 34:15 Lamya schal ligge there, and foond rest there to hir silf.

The Bishops' Bible of Matthew Parker (1568) from the Latin:

Isa 34:14 there shall the Lamia lye and haue her lodgyng.

Douay–Rheims Bible (1582/1610) also preserves the Latin rendering lamia:

Isa 34:14 And demons and monsters shall meet, and the hairy ones shall cry out one to another, there hath the lamia lain down, and found rest for herself.

The Geneva Bible of William Whittingham (1587) from the Hebrew:

Isa 34:14 and the screech owl shall rest there, and shall finde for her selfe a quiet dwelling.

Then the King James Version (1611):

Isa 34:14 The wild beasts of the desert shall also meet with the wild beasts of the island, and the satyr shall cry to his fellow; the screech owl also shall rest there, and find for herself a place of rest.

The "screech owl" translation of the King James Version is, together with the "owl" (yanšup, probably a water bird) in 34:11 and the "great owl" (qippoz, translated in other versions as a snake) of 34:15, an attempt to render the passage by choosing suitable animals for difficult to translate Hebrew words.

Later translations include:

- night-owl (Young, 1898)
- night spectre (Rotherham, Emphasized Bible, 1902)
- night monster (ASV, 1901; JPS 1917, Good News Translation, 1992; NASB, 1995)
- vampires (Moffatt Translation, 1922; Knox Bible, 1950)
- night hag (Revised Standard Version, 1947)
- Lilith (Jerusalem Bible, 1966) (New Jerusalem Bible, 1985)
- (the) lilith (New American Bible, 1970)
- Lilith (New Revised Standard Version, 1989)
- (the) night-demon Lilith, evil and rapacious (The Message (Bible), Peterson, 1993)
- night creature (New International Version, 1978; New King James Version, 1982; New Living Translation, 1996, Today's New International Version)
- nightjar (New World Translation of the Holy Scriptures, 1984)
- night bird (English Standard Version, 2001)
- night-bird (NASB, 2020)
- nocturnal animals (New English Translation (NET Bible))

== Jewish tradition ==
Major sources in Jewish tradition regarding Lilith in chronological order include:

- c. 40–10 BC Dead Sea Scrolls – Songs of the Sage (4Q510–511)
- c. 300–600 Incantation Bowls
- c. 500 Gemara of the Talmud
- c. 700–1000 The Alphabet of Ben-Sira
- c. 900 Midrash Abkir
- c. 1100 Midrash Rabbah
- c. 1260 Treatise on the Left Emanation, Spain
- c. 1280 Zohar, Spain.

=== Dead Sea Scrolls ===
The Dead Sea Scrolls contain one indisputable reference to Lilith in Songs of the Sage (4Q510–511) fragment 1:

And I, the Instructor, proclaim His glorious splendour so as to frighten and to te[rrify] all the spirits of the destroying angels; spirits of the bastards, demons, Lilith, howlers, and [desert dwellers] ... and those which fall upon men, without warning, to lead them astray from a spirit of understanding, and to make their heart and their minds desolate during the present dominion of wickedness and predetermined time of humiliations for the Sons of Lig[ht], by the guilt of the ages of [those] smitten by iniquity – not for eternal destruction, [bu]t for an era of humiliation for transgression.

Photographic reproduction of the Great Isaiah Scroll, which contains a reference to plural liliyyot

As with the Massoretic text of Isaiah 34:14, and therefore unlike the plural liliyyot (or liliyyoth) in the Isaiah scroll 34:14, lilit in 4Q510 is singular, this liturgical text both cautions against the presence of supernatural malevolence and assumes familiarity with Lilith; distinct from the biblical text, however, this passage does not function under any socio-political agenda, but instead serves in the same capacity as An Exorcism (4Q560) and Songs to Disperse Demons (11Q11). The text is thus, to a community "deeply involved in the realm of demonology", an exorcism hymn.

Joseph M. Baumgarten (1991) identified the unnamed woman of The Seductress (4Q184) as related to the female demon. However, John J. Collins regards this identification as "intriguing" but that it is "safe to say" that (4Q184) is based on the strange woman of Proverbs 2, 5, 7, 9:

Her house sinks down to death,
And her course leads to the shades.
All who go to her cannot return
And find again the paths of life.

— Proverbs 2:18–19

Her gates are gates of death, and from the entrance of the house
She sets out towards Sheol.
None of those who enter there will ever return,
And all who possess her will descend to the Pit.

— 4Q184

=== Incantation bowls ===
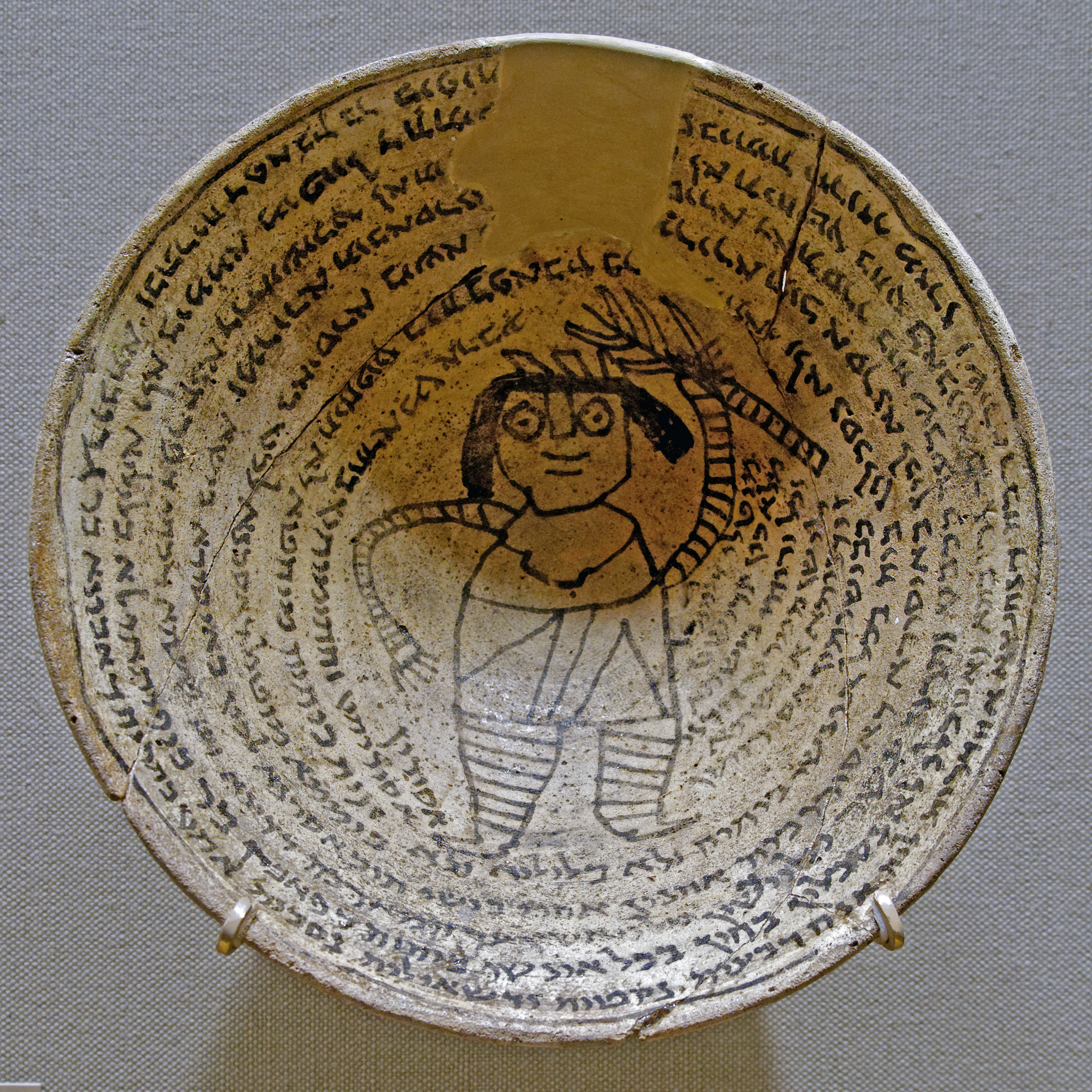
Incantation bowl with an Aramaic inscription, from Nippur, Mesopotamia, 6–7th century

An individual Lilith, male and female liliths, along with Bagdana "king of the lilits", are the demons to feature prominently in protective spells in the eighty surviving Jewish occult incantation bowls from Sassanid Empire Babylon (4th–6th century AD) with influence from Iranian culture.^{[47]} These bowls were buried upside down below the structure of the house or on the land of the house, in order to trap the demon or demoness. Almost every house was found to have such protective bowls against demons and demonesses.

The centre of the inside of the bowl depicts a lilith, or the male form, lilin (lylyn/lylyyn). Surrounding the image is writing in spiral form; the writing often begins at the centre and works its way to the edge. The writing is most commonly scripture or references to the Talmud. The incantation bowls which have been analysed, are inscribed in the following languages, Jewish Babylonian Aramaic, Syriac, Mandaic, Middle Persian, and Arabic. Some bowls are written in a false script which has no meaning.

The correctly worded incantation bowl was capable of warding off liliths or lilin from the household. A lilith had the power to transform into a woman's physical features, seduce her husband, and conceive a child. However, she would become hateful toward the children born of the husband and wife and would seek to kill them. Similarly, lilin would transform into the physical features of the husband, seduce the wife, and she would give birth to a child. It would become evident that the child was not fathered by the husband, and the child would be looked down on. Lilin would seek revenge on the family by killing the children born to the husband and wife.

Key features of the depiction of liliths or lilin include the following. The figure is often depicted with arms and legs chained, indicating the control of the family over the demon(ess). The demon(ess) is depicted in a frontal position with the whole face showing. The eyes are very large, as well as the hands (if depicted). The demon(ess) is entirely static.

One bowl contains the following inscription commissioned from a Jewish occultist to protect a woman called Rashnoi and her husband from liliths:

Thou liliths, male lili and female lilith, hag and ghool, I adjure you by the Strong One of Abraham, by the Rock of Isaac, by the Shaddai of Jacob, by Yah Ha-Shem by Yah his memorial, to turn away from this Rashnoi b. M. and from Geyonai b. M. her husband. [Here is] your divorce and writ and letter of separation, sent through holy angels. Amen, Amen, Selah, Halleluyah! (image)

— Excerpt from translation in Aramaic Incantation Texts from Nippur.

=== Early Rabbinic literature ===
==== Babylonian Talmud ====
Lilith does not occur in the Mishnah. The Jerusalem Talmud contains one mention in the 1523 Bomberg edition (Shabbat 6:9), which is not supported by any manuscript. The word "lilit" appears five times in the Babylonian Talmud:

- "Rav Judah citing Samuel ruled: If an abortion has the likeness of lilit, its mother is unclean by reason of the birth, [for] it is a child except that it has wings." (b. Niddah 24b)
- "[Expounding upon the curses of womanhood] In a baraita it was taught: She grows her hair like lilit, sits when urinating like an animal, and serves as a bolster for her husband." (b. Eruvin 100b)
- "For a pricking sensation: (Note: Rashi: espointe; Jastrow: "a sort of fever (?)"; Kohut: "side stitch".) he should bring an Arrow of Lilith (Note: Text confused; see Diqduqe soferim hashalem. Many assume the literal sense is "an arrow of Lilith" but Kohut: "a shaft of lightning". Arukh: "a stone in the shape of an arrow and falls with the hail, and upturns the Accuser". Rashi: "a stone in the shape of an arrow and falls from the sky with the hail". Wojciech speculates: "Probably a meteorite stone or a fulgurite, colloquially known as petrified lightning." Cf. Sherira's commentary (meaning obscure).) and upturn it, and pour water on it and drink it. Alternatively he can take water of which a dog has drunk at night, but he must take care that it has not been exposed." (b. Gittin 69b).
- "Rabbah said: I saw (Note: Yom Tov of Seville writes (ad loc.) "The Geonim record that every time it says 'I saw' in this formula, it was a dream-vision".) Hormin (Note: Rashbam: "Hormin is our version, so I heard from my honored father. But I heard Hormiz, a type of demon." This latter version is represented in the Ritva and Arukh, as well as MSS Hamburg 165, Paris 1337, and Escorial 1115; cf. Tosafot to b. Gittin 11a s.v. Hormin. Hormin (Ahriman) and Hormiz (Ormuzd) are the two opposing forces in Zoroastrianism. The commentary attributed to Rabbenu Gershom also comments "a certain demon", but Ritva, "Some say that it is demon, and demons are more visible when positioned to the north. But others say that it is the name of a man who was very knowledgeable in the ways of demons and optical illusion.") the son of Lilith running on the parapet of the wall of Mahoza, and a rider, galloping below on horseback, could not overtake him. Once, they saddled for him two mules which stood on two bridges of the Rognag; (Note: Corrupt or obscure; variants: Ronag, Donag, Rornag, Dognag, Dog, Agnag, Dinag, Dornag, Davang, Ravang. Arukh cites "bridges of the river".) and he jumped from one to the other, backward and forward, holding in his hands two cups of wine, pouring alternately from one to the other, and not a drop fell to the ground. This was a day of 'They mount up to the heavens, they go down again to the depths', until word reached the house of the king (Note: According to the commentary attributed to Gershom, the king of the demons heard that he was performing public magic and killed him to protect their secrets. Another possibility is cited in Rashbam: "The house of the Caesar, who feared lest the kingship be taken from him by this creature spawned by man lying with demon, who lives among men.") and they killed him." (b. Bava Batra 73a-b).
- "R. Hanina said: One may not sleep in a house alone, and whoever sleeps in a house alone is seized by lilit." (b. Shabbat 151b)

The above statement by Hanina may be related to the belief that nocturnal emissions engendered the birth of demons:

- "R. Jeremiah b. Eleazar further stated: In all those years [130 years after his expulsion from the Garden of Eden] during which Adam was under the ban he begot ghosts and male demons and female demons [or night demons], for it is said in Scripture: And Adam lived a hundred and thirty years and begot a son in own likeness, after his own image, from which it follows that until that time he did not beget after his own image ... When he saw that through him death was ordained as punishment he spent a hundred and thirty years in fasting, severed connection with his wife for a hundred and thirty years, and wore clothes of fig on his body for a hundred and thirty years. – That statement [of R. Jeremiah] was made in reference to the semen which he emitted accidentally." (b. Eruvin 18b)

==== Targum to Job ====
In the Targum to Job (of uncertain date, early centuries CE), Lilith is identified with the Queen of Sheba, and rules the Kingdom of Emerald/Zemargad.

=== Alphabet of Ben Sira ===
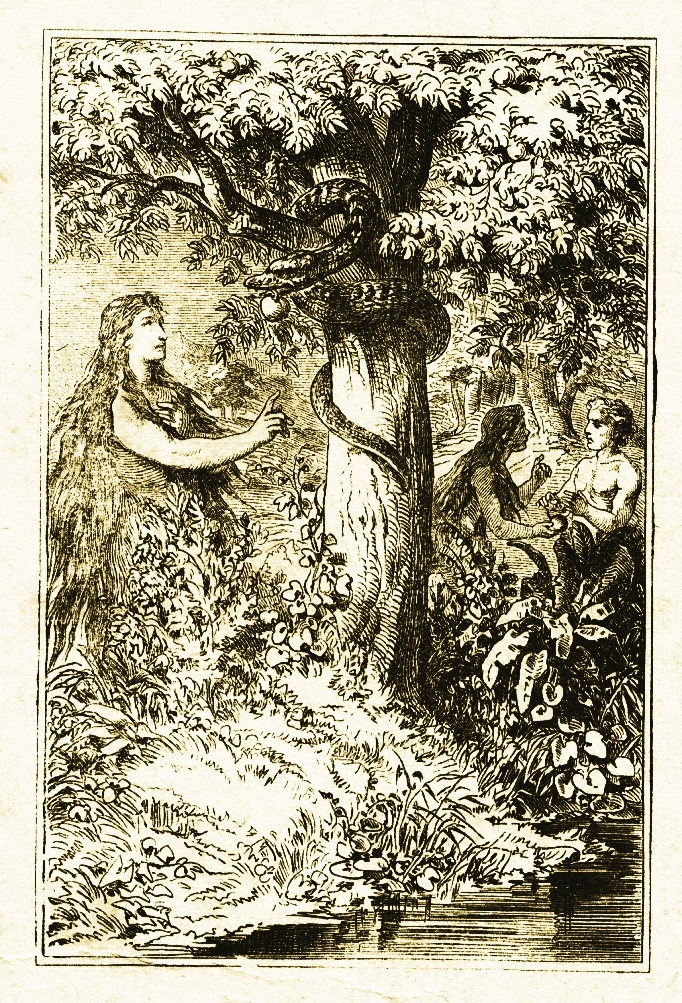
Lilith, illustration by Carl Poellath from 1886 or earlier

The pseudepigraphical 8th–10th centuries Alphabet of Ben Sira is considered to be the oldest form of the story of Lilith as Adam's first wife. Whether this particular tradition is older is not known. Scholars tend to date the Alphabet between the 8th and 10th centuries AD. The work has been characterized by some scholars as satirical, but Ginzberg concluded it was meant seriously.

In the text, an amulet is inscribed with the names of three angels (Senoy, Sansenoy, and Semangelof) and placed around the neck of newborn boys in order to protect them from the lilin until their circumcision. The amulets used against Lilith that were thought to derive from this tradition are, in fact, dated as being much older. The concept of Eve having a predecessor is not exclusive to the Alphabet, and is not a new concept, as it can be found in Genesis Rabbah. However, the idea that Lilith was the predecessor may be exclusive to the Alphabet.

The idea in the text that Adam had a wife prior to Eve may have developed from an interpretation of the Book of Genesis and its dual creation accounts; while Genesis 2:22 describes God's creation of Eve from Adam's rib, an earlier passage, 1:27, already indicates that a woman had been made: "So God created man in his own image, in the image of God created he him; male and female created he them." The Alphabet text places Lilith's creation after God's words in Genesis 2:18 that "it is not good for man to be alone"; in this text God forms Lilith out of the clay from which he made Adam but she and Adam bicker. Lilith claims that since she and Adam were created in the same way they were equal and she refuses to submit to him:

After God created Adam, who was alone, He said, "It is not good for man to be alone." He then created a woman for Adam, from the earth, as He had created Adam himself, and called her Lilith. Adam and Lilith immediately began to fight. She said, "I will not lie below," and he said, "I will not lie beneath you, but only on top. For you are fit only to be in the bottom position, while I am to be the superior one." Lilith responded, "We are equal to each other inasmuch as we were both created from the earth." But they would not listen to one another. When Lilith saw this, she pronounced the Ineffable Name and flew away into the air.

Adam stood in prayer before his Creator: "Sovereign of the universe!" he said, "the woman you gave me has run away." At once, the Holy One, blessed be He, sent these three angels Senoy, Sansenoy, and Semangelof, to bring her back.

Said the Holy One to Adam, "If she agrees to come back, what is made is good. If not, she must permit one hundred of her children to die every day." The angels left God and pursued Lilith, whom they overtook in the midst of the sea, in the mighty waters wherein the Egyptians were destined to drown. They told her God's word, but she did not wish to return. The angels said, "We shall drown you in the sea."

"Leave me!' she said. "I was created only to cause sickness to infants. If the infant is male, I have dominion over him for eight days after his birth, and if female, for twenty days."

When the angels heard Lilith's words, they insisted she go back. But she swore to them by the name of the living and eternal God: "Whenever I see you or your names or your forms in an amulet, I will have no power over that infant." She also agreed to have one hundred of her children die every day. Accordingly, every day one hundred demons perish, and for the same reason, we write the angels' names on the amulets of young children. When Lilith sees their names, she remembers her oath, and the child recovers.

The background and purpose of The Alphabet of Ben-Sira is unclear. It is a collection of stories about heroes of the Bible and Talmud, it may have been a collection of folk-tales, a refutation of Christian, Karaite, or other separatist movements; its content seems so offensive to contemporary Jews that it was even suggested that it could be an anti-Jewish satire, although, in any case, the text was accepted by the Jewish mystics of medieval Germany.

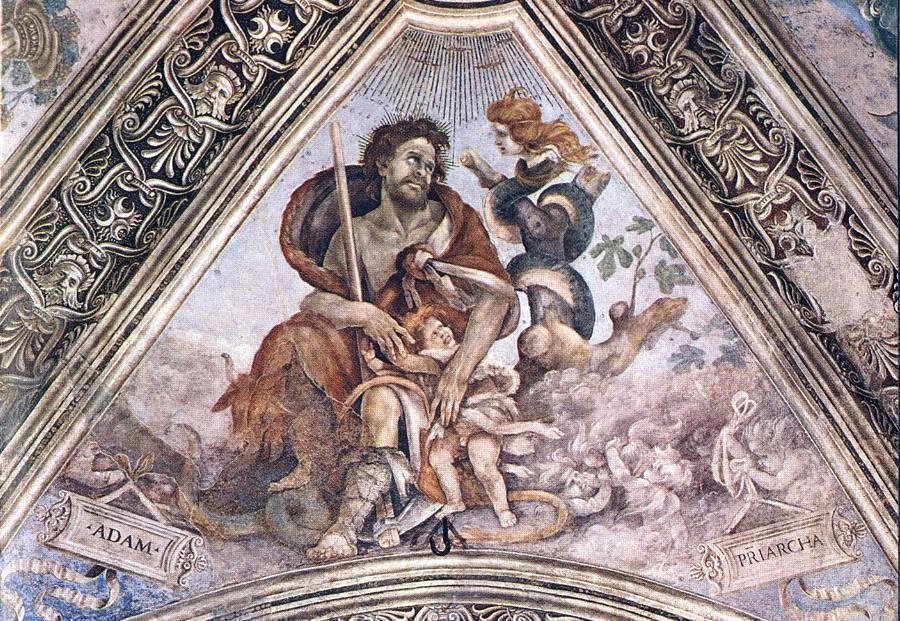
Adam clutches a child in the presence of the child-snatcher Lilith. Fresco by Filippino Lippi, basilica of Santa Maria Novella, Florence.

The Alphabet of Ben-Sira is the earliest surviving source of the story, and the conception that Lilith was Adam's first wife became only widely known with the 17th century Lexicon Talmudicum of German scholar Johannes Buxtorf.

=== Midrash ===
==== Midrash ABKIR ====
The first medieval source to depict Adam and Lilith in full was the Midrash A.B.K.I.R. (c. 10th century), which was followed by the Zohar and other Kabbalistic writings. Adam is said to be perfect until he recognises either his sin or Cain's fratricide that is the cause of bringing death into the world, and separates from holy Eve. During this time, a lilith named Pizna desires his beauty and seduces him against his will. She gives birth to multitudes of djinns and lilin, the first of them being named Agrimas. Agrimas took the lilith Amarit, and their first born, Avalmas, took the lilith Gofrit, and they too bore thousands of djinns and lilin. However, they are defeated by Methuselah, who slays thousands of them with a holy sword and forces Agrimas to give him the names of the rest, after which he casts them away to the sea and the mountains.

==== Midrash Rabbah ====
The Midrash Rabbah collection contains two references to Lilith. The first one is present in Genesis Rabbah 22:7 and 18:4: according to Rabbi Yehuda beRabbi, God proceeded to create a second Eve for Adam, after Lilith had to return to dust. However, to be exact the said passages do not employ the Hebrew word lilith itself and instead speak of "the first Eve" (Hebrew: חַוָּה הָרִאשׁוֹנָה, romanized: ḥawwā hārīšōnā, analogical to Adam ha-Rishon "the first Adam"). Although in the medieval Hebrew literature and folklore, especially that reflected on the protective amulets of various kinds, "The First Eve" was identified with Lilith, one should remain careful in transposing this equation to the Late Antiquity.

The second mention of Lilith, this time explicit, is present in Numbers Rabbah 16:25. The midrash develops the story of Moses's plea after God expresses anger at the bad report of the spies. Moses responds to a threat by God that He will destroy the Israelite people. Moses pleads before God, that God should not be like Lilith who kills her own children. Moses said:

[God,] do not do it [i.e. destroy the Israelite people], that the nations of the world may not regard you as a cruel Being and say: 'The Generation of the Flood came and He destroyed them, the Generation of the Separation came and He destroyed them, the Sodomites and the Egyptians came and He destroyed them, and these also, whom he called My son, My firstborn (Ex. IV, 22), He is now destroying! As that Lilith who, when she finds nothing else, turns upon her own children, so Because the Lord was not able to bring this people into the land... He hath slain them' (Num. XIV, 16)!

==== The influence of the rabbinic traditions ====
Although the image of Lilith of the Alphabet of Ben Sira is unprecedented, some elements in her portrayal can be traced back to the talmudic and midrashic traditions that arose around Eve.

First and foremost, the very introduction of Lilith to the creation story rests on the rabbinic myth, prompted by the two separate creation accounts in Genesis 1:1–2:25, that there were two original women. A way of resolving the apparent discrepancy between these two accounts was to assume that there must have been some other first woman, apart from the one later identified with Eve. The Rabbis, noting Adam's exclamation, "this time (zot hapa'am) [this is] bone of my bone and flesh of my flesh" (Genesis 2:23), took it as an intimation that there must already have been a "first time". According to Genesis rabbah 18:4, Adam was disgusted upon seeing the first woman full of "discharge and blood", and God had to provide him with another one. The subsequent creation is performed with adequate precautions: Adam is made to sleep, so as not to witness the process itself (Sanhedrin 39a), and Eve is adorned with fine jewellery (Genesis rabbah 18:1) and brought to Adam by the angels Gabriel and Michael (ibid. 18:3). However, nowhere do the rabbis specify what happened to the first woman, leaving the matter open for further speculation. This is the gap into which the later tradition of Lilith could fit.

Second, this new woman is still met with harsh rabbinic allegations. Again playing on the Hebrew phrase zot hapa'am, Adam, according to the same midrash, declares: "it is she [zot] who is destined to strike the bell [zog] and to speak [in strife] against me, as you read, 'a golden bell [pa'amon] and a pomegranate' [Exodus 28:34] ... it is she who will trouble me [mefa'amtani] all night" (Genesis Rabbah 18:4). The first woman also becomes the object of accusations ascribed to Rabbi Joshua of Siknin, according to whom Eve, despite the divine efforts, turned out to be "swelled-headed, coquette, eavesdropper, gossip, prone to jealousy, light-fingered and gadabout" (Genesis Rabbah 18:2). A similar set of charges appears in Genesis Rabbah 17:8, according to which Eve's creation from Adam's rib rather than from the earth makes her inferior to Adam and never satisfied with anything.

Third, and despite the terseness of the biblical text in this regard, the erotic iniquities attributed to Eve constitute a separate category of her shortcomings. Told in Genesis 3:16 that "your desire shall be for your husband", she is accused by the Rabbis of having an overdeveloped sexual drive (Genesis Rabbah 20:7) and constantly enticing Adam (Genesis Rabbah 23:5). However, in terms of textual popularity and dissemination, the motif of Eve copulating with the primeval serpent takes priority over her other sexual transgressions. This interpretation is related in the Midrash in Genesis Rabbah 18:6, and in the Babylonian Talmud in Sotah 9b, Shabbat 145b–146a and 156a, Yevamot 103b and Avodah Zarah 22b.

=== Kabbalah ===
Kabbalistic mysticism attempted to establish a more exact relationship between Lilith and God. With her major characteristics having been well developed by the end of the Talmudic period, after six centuries had elapsed between the Aramaic incantation texts that mention Lilith and the early Spanish Kabbalistic writings in the 13th century, she reappears, and her life history becomes known in greater mythological detail.

In the later Kabbalistic literature (e.g. Tuv haAretz), Lilith is not the sole wife of Samael, but the first of four, among Naamah, Agrat bat Mahlat and Mahlat. Eisheth Zenunim (woman of whoredom/harlotry), an epithet of Lilith in the Zohar, is contemporarily personified as a separate demonic entity.

==== Treatise on the Left Emanation ====
The mystical writing of two brothers Jacob and Isaac Hacohen, Treatise on the Left Emanation, which predates the Zohar by a few decades, states that Samael and Lilith are in the shape of an androgynous being, double-faced, born out of the emanation of the Throne of Glory and corresponding in the spiritual realm to Adam and Eve, who were likewise born as a hermaphrodite. The two twin androgynous couples resembled each other and both "were like the image of Above"; that is, that they are reproduced in a visible form of an androgynous deity.

19. In answer to your question concerning Lilith, I shall explain to you the essence of the matter. Concerning this point there is a received tradition from the ancient Sages who made use of the Secret Knowledge of the Lesser Palaces, which is the manipulation of demons and a ladder by which one ascends to the prophetic levels. In this tradition it is made clear that Samael and Lilith were born as one, similar to the form of Adam and Eve who were also born as one, reflecting what is above. This is the account of Lilith which was received by the Sages in the Secret Knowledge of the Palaces.

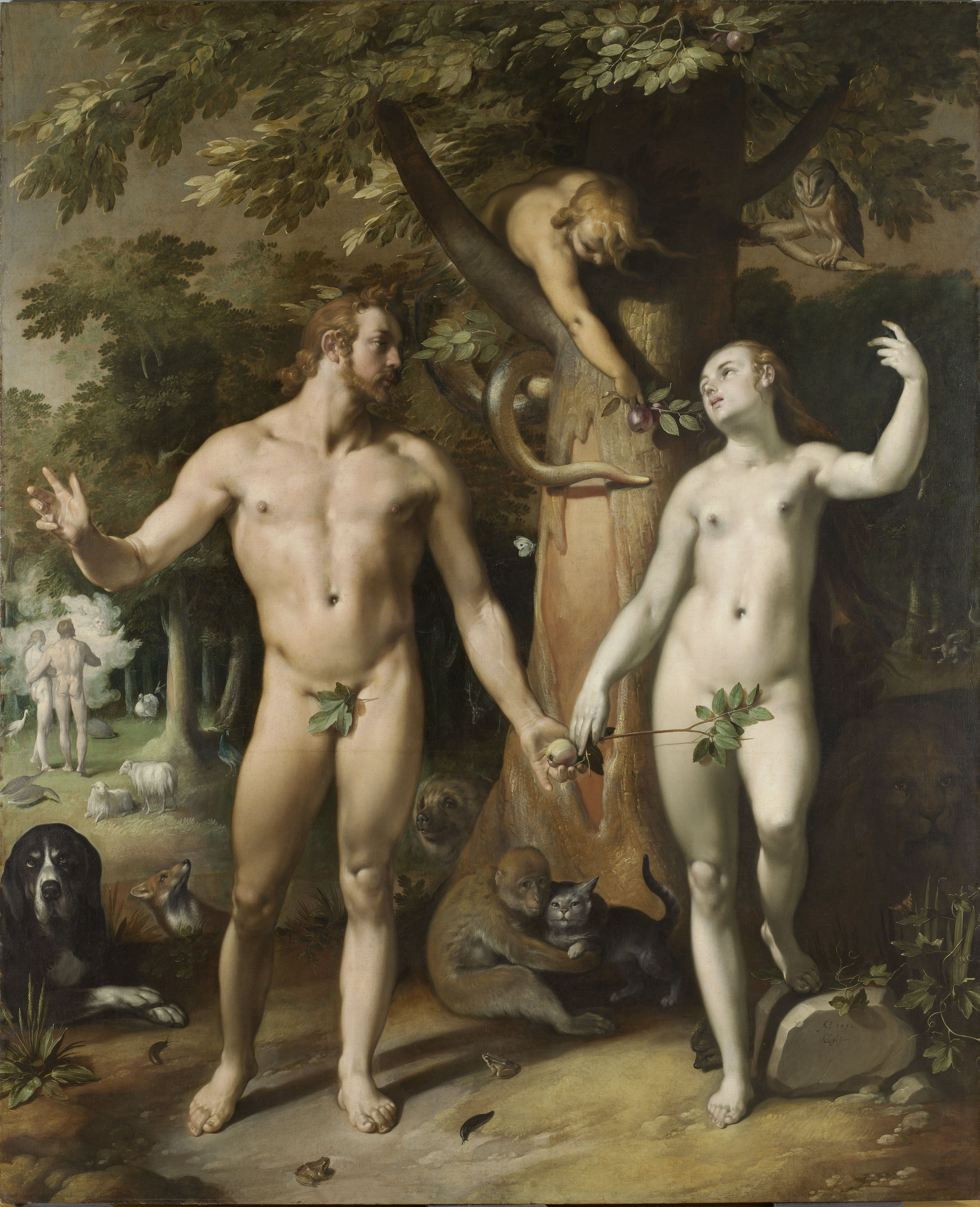
The Fall of Man by Cornelis van Haarlem (1592), showing the serpent in the Garden of Eden as a woman

The Treatise on the Left Emanation also says that there are two Liliths, the lesser being married to the great demon Asmodeus.

The Matron Lilith is the mate of Samael. Both of them were born at the same hour in the image of Adam and Eve, intertwined in each other. Asmodeus the great king of the demons has as a mate the Lesser (younger) Lilith, daughter of the king whose name is Qafsefoni. The name of his mate is Mehetabel daughter of Matred, and their daughter is Lilith.

Qafsefoni/Qaftzefoni also couples with a being named Lilita/Lilidtha, who resembles Hagar the Egyptian. Whether Lilita is identical with Lilith the Younger, Qaftzefoni's own daughter, cannot be established.

==== Moses of Burgos ====
The texts attributed to Moses ben Solomon of Burgos, a 13th century pre-Zoharic Kabbalist, focus on the problem of evil.

Know that all the jealousy and altercation between the Princes of Quarrel and the Princes of Peace ... is on account of Samael and Lilith who is called Northerner (Tzefonit), as it is written "Out of the North, the Evil One shall break forth". Both of them [Samael and Lilith] were born in a spiritual birth as androgynes, corresponding to Adam and Eve—below and above two twin figures. And Samael and Lilith the Elder, who is the same as Tzefonit, are referred to as the Tree of Knowledge of Good and Evil.

==== Zohar ====
In the Zohar (c. 13th century), Lilith is often referred to as a Woman of Whoredom (Eisheth Zenunim). References to Lilith in the Zohar include the following:

She roams at night, and goes all about the world and makes sport with men and causes them to emit seed. In every place where a man sleeps alone in a house, she visits him and grabs him and attaches herself to him and has her desire from him, and bears from him. And she also afflicts him with sickness, and he knows it not, and all this takes place when the moon is on the wane.

This passage may be related to the mention of Lilith seizing men sleeping alone in Talmud Shabbat 151b (see above), and also to Talmud Eruvin 18b where nocturnal emissions are connected with the begettal of demons.

According to Raphael Patai, older sources state clearly that after Lilith's Red Sea sojourn (mentioned also in Louis Ginzberg's Legends of the Jews), she returned to Adam and begat children from him by forcing herself upon him. Before doing so, she attaches herself to Cain and bears him numerous spirits and demons. In the Zohar, however, Lilith is said to have succeeded in begetting offspring from Adam even during their short-lived sexual experience. Lilith leaves Adam in Eden, as she is not a suitable helpmate for him. Gershom Scholem proposes that the author of the Zohar, Rabbi Moses de Leon, was aware of both the folk tradition of Lilith and another conflicting version, possibly older.

The Zohar adds further that two female spirits (that some scholars like Patai recognise to be Lilith and Naamah), desired Adam and seduced him. The issue of these unions were demons and spirits called "the plagues of humankind", and the usual added explanation was that it was through Adam's own sin that Lilith overcame him against his will.

===== Creation of Lilith =====
Lilith's creation is described in many alternative versions. One mentions her creation as being before Adam's, on the fifth day, because the "living creatures" with whose swarms God filled the waters included Lilith. A similar version, related to the earlier Talmudic passages, recounts how Lilith was fashioned with the same substance as Adam was, shortly before. A third alternative version states that God originally created Adam and Lilith in a manner that the female creature was contained in the male. Lilith's soul was lodged in the depths of the Great Abyss. When God called her, she joined Adam. After Adam's body was created a thousand souls from the Left (evil) side attempted to attach themselves to him. However, God drove them off. Adam was left lying as a body without a soul. Then a cloud descended and God commanded the earth to produce a living soul. This God breathed into Adam, who began to spring to life and his female was attached to his side. God separated the female from Adam's side. The female side was Lilith, whereupon she flew to the Cities of the Sea and attacked humankind.

Yet another version claims that Lilith emerged as a divine entity that was born spontaneously, either out of the Great Supernal Abyss or out of the power of an aspect of God (the Gevurah of Din). This aspect of God was negative and punitive, as well as one of his ten attributes (Sefirot), at its lowest manifestation has an affinity with the realm of evil and it is out of this that Lilith merged with Samael.

An alternative story links Lilith with the creation of luminaries. The "first light", which is the light of Mercy (one of the Sefirot), appeared on the first day of creation when God said "Let there be light". This light became hidden and the Holiness became surrounded by a husk of evil. "A husk (klippa) was created around the brain" and this husk spread and brought out another husk, which was Lilith.

==== Pardes Rimmonim ====
Pardes Rimmonim (Orchard of Pomegranates) is a Kabbalistic text composed in 1548 by Moses ben Jacob Cordovero. The text expands on the relationship between Lilith, Samael and Tanin'iver/Blind Dragon.

Tanin'iver functions as the intermediary between Samael and Lilith, and it is he who arranged their match. With the intermediacy of the dragon, they receive an emanation of evil and insolence, and one day, God will punish Leviathan the Slant Serpent, who corresponds to Samael, and Leviathan the Tortuous Serpent, who is Lilith. Leviathan is the connection between them, who have the likeness of serpents (186d).

Pardes Rimmonim also tells of the fight between Lilith and Mahalath. There are two Liliths, the greater Lilith, the Woman of Harlotry, bride of Samael, and the Lesser, bride of Asmodeus. The greater Lilith controls 480 legions, and on the Day of the Atonement, they go to the desert, march and screech, for Lilith is the princess of screeching. Mahalath joins with 478 legions and sings in the Holy Tongue songs and paeans, and when she meets Lilith in the desert on the Day of the Atonement, they fight, their voices rising to the heavens, causing the earth to shake. This is caused by God, so they don't bother Israelites while they pray (186d).

==== Emeq HaMelekh ====
Emeq HaMelekh (Valley of the King) is a Kabbalistic text, written by Naftali Hertz ben Yaakov Elchanan (Bacharach) in 1648.

A passage charges Lilith as being a tempting serpent of Eve. She managed to seduce her because Adam coupled with Eve while she was in her menstrual impurity, which is the filth of the Serpent (Samael) who mounted Eve before Adam mounted her. When Lilith saw the greatness of Adam's corruption, she became "strong in her husks", came to Adam against his will and bore him demons, spirits and lilin (23c-d)

According to the text, in the second of the seven earth-layers, counting from the bottom, dwell:

the giant human figures, tall of stature, who were born of Adam in the 130 years during which he begot demons, spirits, and Lilin. Lilith used to come to him against his will and conceive from Adam [and she bore these beings]. And they are always sad and full of sorrow and sighs, and there is no joy at all among them. And these hosts can multiply [and ascend] from that earth to this world upon which we stand, and [here] they become harmful spirits, and [then] they return there ... (179d–180a)

Lilith has dominion over children who are born when the man has intercourse at candlelight, or with his wife naked, or at times when intercourse is forbidden. The children of such unions, called "Oppressed Souls", Lilith can kill whenever she wants to, and this explains the secret of the children laughing in their sleep when they're small. Lilith plays with them during the Shabbat night or the night of the New Moon, and their parent or anyone who sees them laugh should cap their nose with their finger and thrice say "Go from here, you accursed one, for you have no resting place here!", while tapping the child on the nose (84b). The marriage of Lilith and Samael, also known as the "Angel Satan" or the "Other God", was not allowed to last. To prevent Lilith and Samael's demonic children from filling the world, God castrated Samael. In many 17th century Kabbalistic books, such as Emeq HaMelekh, this seems to be a reinterpretation of an old Talmudic myth where God castrated the male Leviathan and slew the female Leviathan in order to prevent them from mating and thereby destroying the Earth with their offspring. With Lilith being unable to fornicate with Samael anymore, she sought to couple with men who experience nocturnal emissions. The text states that God has "cooled" the female Leviathan, meaning that he has made Lilith infertile and she is a mere fornication.

Lilith is a harlot who fornicates with men. She has no mating with her husband, for He [God] castrated the male and cooled the female. And she becomes hot from the fornication of men, through spontaneous emission. And enough of this.

Samael is called the Slant Serpent, and Lilith is called the Tortuous Serpent (Isa. 27: 1). She seduces men to go in tortuous ways.

The Alien Woman is Lilith, and she is the sweetness of sin and the evil tongue. And from the lips of the Alien Woman honey flows. And although the Impure Female has no hands and feet for copulation, for the feet of the serpent were cut off, nevertheless the Female in her adornments looks as if she had hands and feet. And it is the mystery of her adornments that she can seduce men .... And she leaves the husband of her youth [Samael] and descends and fornicates with men who sleep below in the impurity of spontaneous emission, and from them are born demons and spirits and Lilin, and they are called the Sons of Man. (84b, 84c, 102d–103a)

Lilith is present in the sheets of the bed of the couple that copulates, in order to take the drops of semen which go to waste, so she can create from them spirits, demons and lilin. An incantation to drive away Lilith from the bed is said to be mentioned in the Holy Zohar, which points to Zohar 3:19b (19c). The marriage of Samael and Lilith was arranged by Tanin'iver ("Blind Dragon"), who is the counterpart of "the dragon that is in the sea". Blind Dragon acts as an intermediary between Lilith and Samael:

Blind Dragon rides Lilith the Sinful – may she be extirpated quickly in our days, Amen! – And this Blind Dragon brings about the union between Samael and Lilith. And just as the Dragon that is in the sea (Isa. 27:1) has no eyes, likewise Blind Dragon that is above, in the likeness of a spiritual form, is without eyes, that is to say, without colors. (84b)

Lilith will be killed, as the Dragon will swallow a lethal potion in the future, and when he rises up, Gabriel and Michael will join forces to subdue and bring low the government of evil which will be in heaven and earth (84b). The blind dragon rides on Lilith "the wicked", brings the union between Samael and Lilith only in pestilence, and is castrated, otherwise the world would be annihilated. Lilith is said to have fourteen evil times, names and factions, and all are ordained to kill children (140b).

==== Yalqut Reubeni ====
Yalqut Reubeni/R'uveni (1660 and 1681), a two part anthology of the aggadic output of the Kabbalists, gives a description on the creation of Lilith, where God created the first Eve (Lilith) not from flesh but from the "scum of the earth and its impure sediments", resulting in a harmful spirit. God ended up taking her away from Adam and giving him another woman (34b). Information on the prince that serves Lilith, called Sariel, is also given. He's the king of the demons who rule in the air, and on the Day of Atonement, he's forced by sages and elders to give the secrets of the firmament, written and sealed, and he's accompanied by 131 warriors flying in the air whose faces are aflame. From Sariel's emanation come spirits, demons and lilin (147a).

=== Other Jewish Texts ===
==== School of the RaShBA ====
According to the school of the RaShBA (14th century), Lilith and Agrat, in order to try King Solomon's wisdom, disguised themselves as prostitutes, and went to Solomon asking for his judgement in their quarrel over their surviving child. Lilith strangles children for she herself is barren, and cannot bear one of her own. The four demon queens (Lilith, Na'amah, Agrat and Mahalath) and their cohorts bear children, except for Lilith who is just fornication alone.

==== Sefer Meir T'hillot ====
The text Sefer Meir T'hillot/Meïr Tehillot (The Illuminator of the Psalms) by Rabbi Meir ben Yitzchak (1512) describes the genealogy of Agrat, daughter of Mahalath. Mahalath was born in the Egyptian desert by the daughter of Kasdiel, the Egyptian sorcerer, and both her and her mother participated in sorceries. In the desert, Mahalath met the ruling spirit Igratiel (or Igrathiel), and bore Agrat, named after the spirit. Afterwards, Mahalath left the desert and became the wife of Esau, while Agrat stayed to rule the four Tequfot (equinoxes and solstices), along with Lilith, Na'amah and Nega.

And they said that Lilith fornicates with all men, and Naamah only with the Gentiles, and Nega' only with Israel, and Igrat is sent out to do harm on the nights preceding the Sabbaths and Wednesdays. And behold, Lilith is the scant measure that is abominable (Mic.6:10), which Igrat and Naamah carry to the Land of Shinar, as Zechariah (5:11) said. And about this it is said to the fearers of God, neither shall any plague (Nega') come nigh thy tent (Ps. 91:10).

==== Rabbeinu Bahya ====
Bahya ben Asher (1546) in his commentary on Genesis 4:22:3, explains that there is a tradition which claims that four women became the mothers of demons, called Lilith, Na'amah, Agrat and Mahalath, and each of them rules over one of the Tequfot (equinoxes and solstices). King Solomon ruled over all of them, called them his slave-women, and used them according to his will. These spirits were also the four wives of Esau's heavenly patron (Samael), and following his example, Esau himself took four wives, as explained in the Pentateuch.

=== Folklore ===
In the folk tradition that arose in the early Middle Ages, Lilith, a dominant female demon, became identified with Asmodeus, King of Demons, as his queen. Asmodeus was already well known by this time because of the legends about him in the Talmud. The second myth of Lilith grew to include legends about another world and by some accounts this other world existed side by side with this one, Yenne Velt is Yiddish for this described "Other World". In this case Asmodeus and Lilith were believed to procreate demonic offspring endlessly and spread chaos at every turn.

Two primary characteristics are seen in these legends about Lilith: Lilith as the incarnation of lust, causing men to be led astray, and Lilith as a child-killing witch, who strangles helpless neonates. These two aspects of the Lilith legend seemed to have evolved separately; there is hardly a tale where she encompasses both roles. But the aspect of the witch-like role that Lilith plays broadens her archetype of the destructive side of witchcraft. Such stories are commonly found among Jewish folklore.

==== Lullaby ====
Charles Richardson's dictionary portion of the Encyclopædia Metropolitana appends to his etymological discussion of lullaby "a [manuscript] note written in a copy of Skinner" [i.e. Stephen Skinner's 1671 Etymologicon Linguæ Anglicanæ], which asserts that the word lullaby originates from Lillu abi abi, a Hebrew incantation meaning "Lilith begone" recited by Jewish mothers over an infant's cradle. Richardson did not endorse the theory and modern lexicographers consider it a false etymology.

=== Hebrew magical amulets ===
==== 17th century amulet in Jean de Pauly's Zohar ====
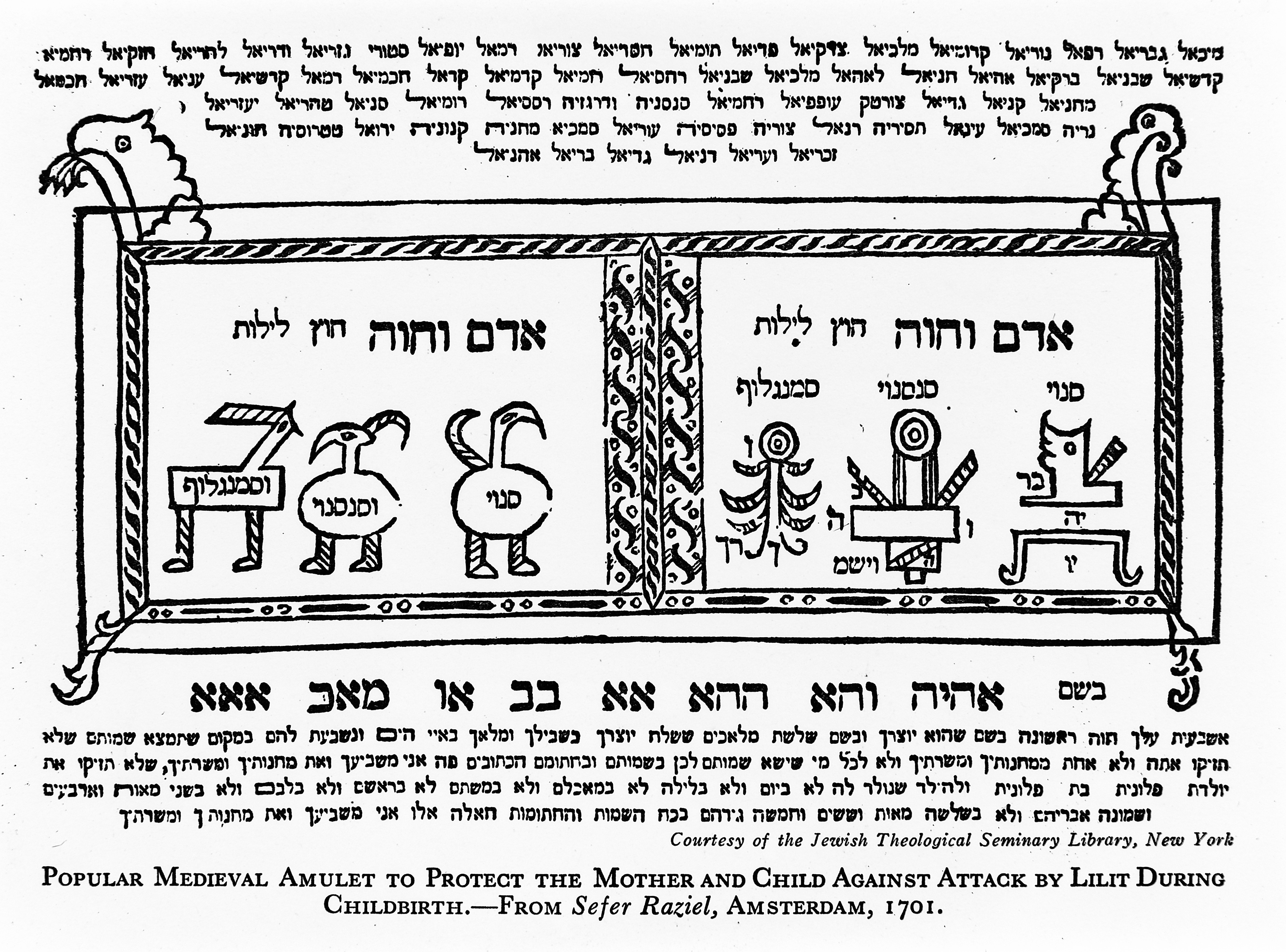
Medieval Hebrew amulet intended to protect a mother and her child from Lilith

A copy of Jean de Pauly's translation of the Zohar in the Ritman Library contains an inserted late 17th century printed Hebrew sheet for use in magical amulets where the prophet Elijah confronts Lilith.

The sheet contains two texts within borders, which are amulets, one for a male ('lazakhar'), the other one for a female ('lanekevah'). The invocations mention Adam, Eve and Lilith, 'Chavah Rishonah' (the first Eve, who is identical with Lilith), also devils or angels: Sanoy, Sansinoy, Smangeluf, Shmari'el (the guardian) and Hasdi'el (the merciful). A few lines in Yiddish are followed by the dialogue between the prophet Elijah and Lilith when he met her with her host of demons to kill the mother and take her new-born child ('to drink her blood, suck her bones and eat her flesh'). She tells Elijah that she will lose her power if someone uses her secret names, which she reveals at the end: lilith, abitu, abizu, hakash, avers hikpodu, ayalu, matrota ...

=== Alsatian Krasmesser (16th to 20th century) ===
Not so much an amulet as a ritual object for protection, the "Krasmesser" (or "Kreismesser", circle knife) played a role in Jewish birth rituals in the area of Alsace, Switzerland and Southern Germany between the 16th and 20th century. The Krasmesser would be used by a midwife or by the husband to draw a magic circle around the pregnant or birthing woman to protect her from Lilith and the evil eye, which were considered to represent the greatest danger for children and pregnant women.

Rabbi Naphtali Hirsch ben Elieser Treves described this custom as early as 1560, and later references to a knife or sword by the birthing bed by both Paul Christian Kirchner and Johann Christian Georg Bodenschatz indicate its continuance. A publication about birth customs by the Jewish Museum of Switzerland also includes oral accounts from 20th century Baden-Württemberg which likewise mention circling movements with a knife in order to protect a woman in childbirth.

== Mandaeism ==
In Mandaean scriptures such as the Ginza Rabba and Qulasta, liliths (Classical Mandaic: ࡋࡉࡋࡉࡕ) are mentioned as inhabitants of the World of Darkness. They appear in numerous incantations, as a class of beings with many names.

Zahriel (ࡆࡀࡄࡓࡏࡉࡋ) is a lilith that helps pregnant women, instead of being a threat to them. She is the daughter of Qin, sister of Ruha and spouse of Hibil Ziwa, with whom she bore Ptahil, the demiurge of the cosmos.

Sufnai (Ṣupnia/Ṣupnai) is the lilith that kidnapped John the Baptist as a child in the Haran Gawaita. While following the motif of a child-snatching demoness, she does so benevolently, and takes the child to a safe place, executing the orders of Anuš ʿUthra, before returning to her place. This is not the sole appearance of Sufnai, as she also appears in incantations where, like the rest of the liliths, she's seen as malevolent.

=== BM 135794 II, Charm Against Demons of Time ===
Lilith is mentioned in a Mandaean magic incantation inscribed in Mandaic on a c. 7th-century Late Antiquity lead amulet designated "BM 135794 II", where she is mentioned together with other demons, in plural form. The first of the charm's text consists of a banning formula that calls for the binding, subduing and destruction of various demons, mentioned by name in plural form, and also talks of the demons of time walking about and harming "the children of Adam and all offspring of Hawa (=Eve)". The lines of this formula are repeated near-identically about three times, with Lilith's name, in plural, appearing in the formula on lines 27, 46 and 55, in the same near-identical line "Sahras, Dews, Rhuas, Humartas and Lilits." At lines 70-100, the banning formula of the charm ends and is taken over by a Mandaic magic story that tells of a gnostic tree made up of different demon groups and of a "Dew" demon dwelling in the tree being cast out of it and expelled from the tree by the archangel Gabriel. In this part of the charm, Lilith is mentioned as a part of this gnostic tree, again rendered in plural. The tree's trunk is said to be made up of "Dews" (or 'dewis' or 'daeva') on lines 76-77, the tree's foliage to be made up of "Latabas" ('devils') on line 77, and its branches to be made up of "Lilits" on lines 77-78. The charm associates the demons with time, using units of time such as "season", "month", "day", "hour", "minute" and so on, and so the charm has been interpreted to be a magical protection against "demons of time" or against time as threatening and harmful elements.

The amulet is part of a set of lead, silver and gold amulets attributed to the family archive of Mah-Adhur Gushnasp, who served as prime minister of the Sasanian Empire during Ardashir III's reign (628-629 AD), and was discovered by Lieutenant Colonel H.S. Alexander in a lead jar under the foundations of a private house in a mound near el-Qurnah at the confluence of the rivers Tigris and Euphrates in southern Iraq during a private dig between 1910 and 1920, which was then passed on to the British Library and is today housed in the Department of the Ancient Near East in the British Museum. The text was translated by scholar Christa Müller-Kessler and published in 2002 in Cornelia Wunsch and C. B. F. Walker's Mining The Archives.

== Syncretism ==
=== Greco-Roman Lamia ===
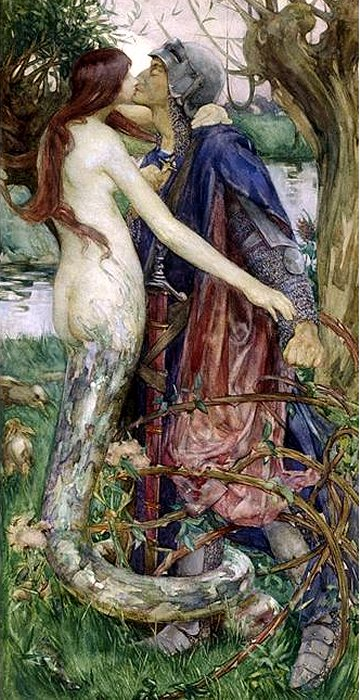
The Kiss of the Enchantress (Isobel Lilian Gloag, c. 1890), inspired by Keats's "Lamia", depicts Lamia as half-serpent, half-woman

In the Latin Vulgate Book of Isaiah 34:14, Lilith is translated lamia.

According to Augustine Calmet, Lilith has connections with early views on vampires and sorcery:

Some learned men have thought they discovered some vestiges of vampirism in the remotest antiquity; but all that they say of it does not come near what is related of the vampires. The lamiae, the strigae, the sorcerers whom they accused of sucking the blood of living people, and of thus causing their death, the magicians who were said to cause the death of new-born children by charms and malignant spells, are nothing less than what we understand by the name of vampires; even were it to be owned that these lamiae and strigae have really existed, which we do not believe can ever be well proved. I own that these terms [lamiae and strigae] are found in the versions of Holy Scripture. For instance, Isaiah, describing the condition to which Babylon was to be reduced after her ruin, says that she shall become the abode of satyrs, lamiae, and strigae (in Hebrew, lilith). This last term, according to the Hebrews, signifies the same thing, as the Greeks express by strix and lamiae, which are sorceresses or magicians, who seek to put to death new-born children. Whence it comes that the Jews are accustomed to write in the four corners of the chamber of a woman just delivered, "Adam, Eve, be gone from hence lilith." ... The ancient Greeks knew these dangerous sorceresses by the name of lamiae, and they believed that they devoured children, or sucked away all their blood till they died.

According to Siegmund Hurwitz the Talmudic Lilith is connected with the Greek Lamia, who, according to Hurwitz, likewise governed a class of child stealing lamia-demons. Lamia bore the title "child killer" and was feared for her malevolence, like Lilith. She has different conflicting origins and is described as having a human upper body from the waist up and a serpentine body from the waist down. One source states simply that she is a daughter of the goddess Hecate, another, that Lamia was subsequently cursed by the goddess Hera to have stillborn children because of her association with Zeus; alternatively, Hera slew all of Lamia's children (except Scylla) in anger that Lamia slept with her husband, Zeus. The grief caused Lamia to turn into a monster that took revenge on mothers by stealing their children and devouring them. Lamia had a vicious sexual appetite that matched her cannibalistic appetite for children. She was notorious for being a vampiric spirit and loved sucking men's blood. Her gift was the "mark of a Sibyl", a gift of second sight. Zeus was said to have given her the gift of sight. However, she was "cursed" to never be able to shut her eyes so that she would forever obsess over her dead children. Taking pity on Lamia, Zeus gave her the ability to remove and replace her eyes from their sockets.

=== Arabic Qarīnah ===
The occult writer Ahmad al-Buni (d. 1225), in his Sun of the Great Knowledge (Arabic: شمس المعارف الكبرى), mentions a demon called "the mother of children" (ام الصبيان), a term also used "in one place". Folkloric traditions recorded around 1953 tell about a jinn called Qarinah, who was rejected by Adam and mated with Iblis instead. She gave birth to a host of demons and became known as their mother. To take revenge on Adam, she pursues human children. As such, she would kill a pregnant mother's baby in the womb, causes impotence to men or attacks little children with illnesses. According to occult practises, she would be subject to the demon-king Murrah al-Abyad, which appears to be another name for Iblis used in magical writings. Although Lilith has no place in the Islamic creation narrative (nor elsewhere in formal Islamic theology), folklore about Lilith influenced that of the Qarinah during the early days.

=== Armenian Āl ===
The demoness Āl, found in West Asian and Mongolian mythology, presents some parallels with Lilith, as both are a threat to children and pregnant women. Specifically in Armenian mythology, Āl gets influenced by the tales of Lilith and appears as the first wife of Adam, that God created before Eve. E. Lalayan, an Armenian ethnographer of the 19-20th CE, documented the tale in Javakheti:

She [was] fiery, one-eyed. Adam [was] bodily, Al [was] fiery: they did not match at all, so Adam did not like Al at all. God saw that Al could not be friends with Adam, so He created Eve. Since then, Al became an enemy of Eve and her descendants.

== In Western media ==
=== In German media ===
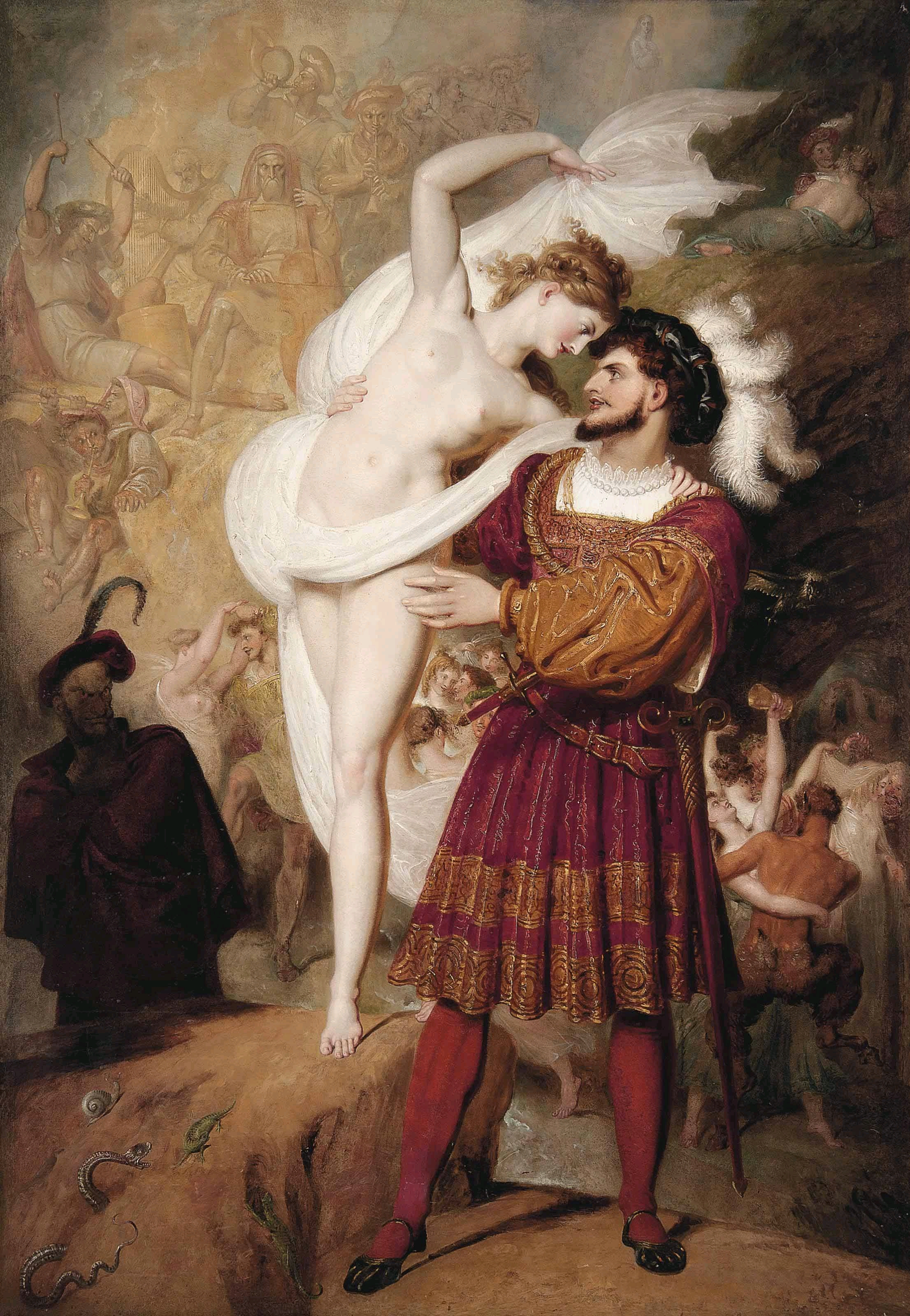
Faust and Lilith by Richard Westall (1831)

Lilith's earliest appearance in the literature of the Romantic period (1789–1832) was in Goethe's 1808 work Faust: The First Part of the Tragedy.

Faust:
Who's that there?
Mephistopheles:
Take a good look.
Lilith.
Faust:
Lilith? Who is that?
Mephistopheles:
Adam's wife, his first. Beware of her.
Her beauty's one boast is her dangerous hair.
When Lilith winds it tight around young men
She doesn't soon let go of them again.

— 1992 Greenberg translation, lines 4206–4211

After Mephistopheles offers this warning to Faust, he then, quite ironically, encourages Faust to dance with "the Pretty Witch". Lilith and Faust engage in a short dialogue, where Lilith recounts the days spent in Eden.

Faust: [dancing with the young witch]
A lovely dream I dreamt one day
I saw a green-leaved apple tree,
Two apples swayed upon a stem,
So tempting! I climbed up for them.
The Pretty Witch:
Ever since the days of Eden
Apples have been man's desire.
How overjoyed I am to think, sir,
Apples grow, too, in my garden.

— 1992 Greenberg translation, lines 4216–4223

=== In English media ===
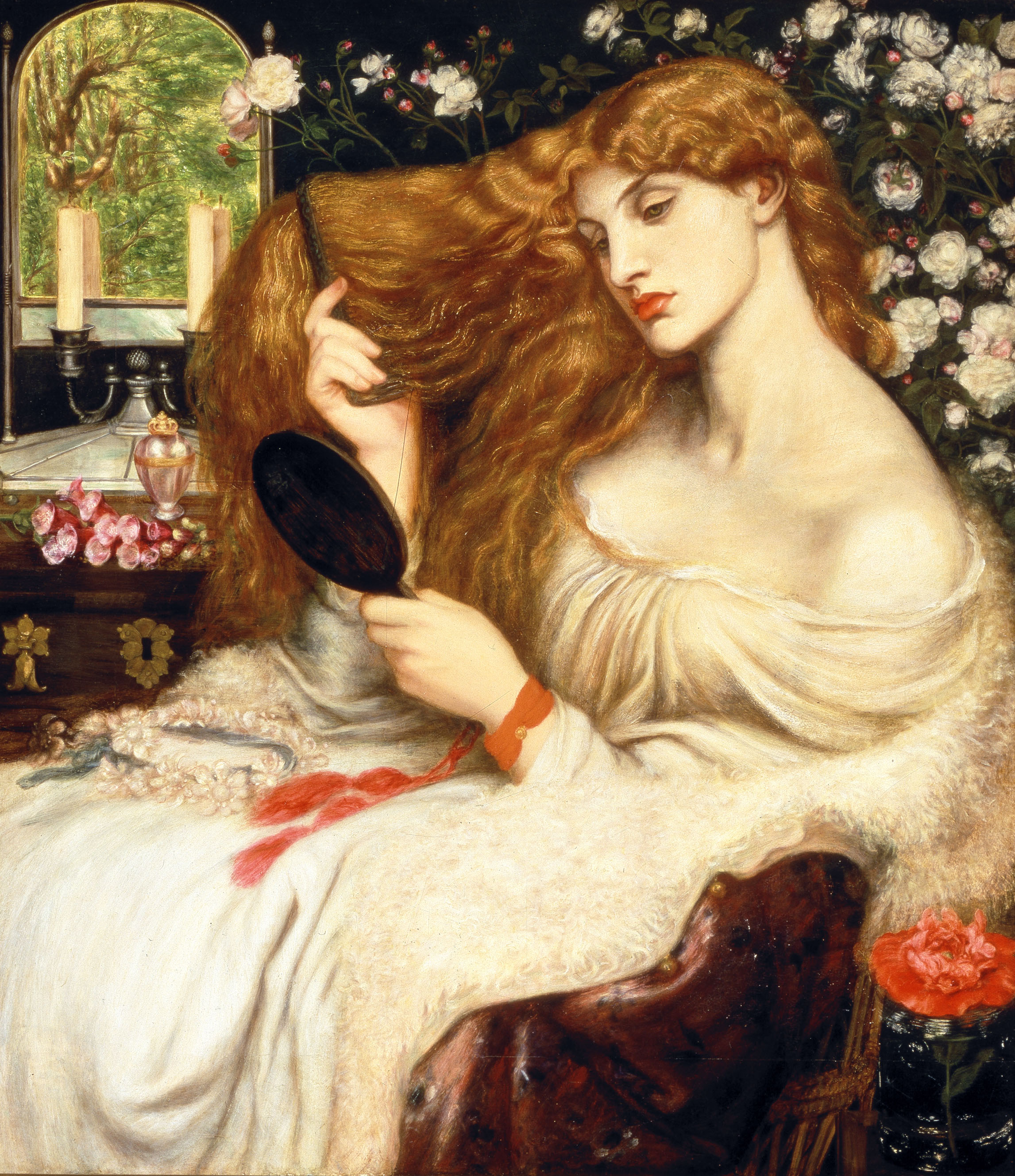
Lady Lilith by Dante Gabriel Rossetti (1866–1868, 1872–1873)

The Pre-Raphaelite Brotherhood, which developed around 1848, were greatly influenced by Goethe's work on the theme of Lilith. In 1863, Dante Gabriel Rossetti of the Brotherhood began painting what would later be his first rendition of Lady Lilith, a painting he expected to be his "best picture hitherto". Symbols appearing in the painting allude to the "femme fatale" reputation of the Romantic Lilith: poppies (death and cold) and white roses (sterile passion). Accompanying his Lady Lilith painting from 1866, Rossetti wrote a sonnet entitled Lilith, which was first published in Swinburne's pamphlet-review (1868), Notes on the Royal Academy Exhibition.

Of Adam's first wife, Lilith, it is told
(The witch he loved before the gift of Eve,)
That, ere the snake's, her sweet tongue could deceive,
And her enchanted hair was the first gold.
And still she sits, young while the earth is old,
And, subtly of herself contemplative,
Draws men to watch the bright web she can weave,
Till heart and body and life are in its hold.
The rose and poppy are her flower; for where
Is he not found, O Lilith, whom shed scent
And soft-shed kisses and soft sleep shall snare?
Lo! As that youth's eyes burned at thine, so went
Thy spell through him, and left his straight neck bent
And round his heart one strangling golden hair.

— Collected Works, 216

The poem and the picture appeared together alongside Rossetti's painting Sibylla Palmifera and the sonnet Soul's Beauty. In 1881, the Lilith sonnet was renamed "Body's Beauty" in order to contrast it and Soul's Beauty. The two were placed sequentially in The House of Life collection (sonnets number 77 and 78).

Rossetti wrote in 1870:

Lady [Lilith] ... represents a Modern Lilith combing out her abundant golden hair and gazing on herself in the glass with that self-absorption by whose strange fascination such natures draw others within their own circle.

— Rossetti, W. M. ii.850, D. G. Rossetti's emphasis

This is in accordance with Jewish folk tradition, which associates Lilith both with long hair (a symbol of dangerous feminine seductive power in Jewish culture), and with possessing women by entering them through mirrors.

The Victorian poet Robert Browning re-envisioned Lilith in his poem "Adam, Lilith, and Eve". First published in 1883, the poem uses the traditional myths surrounding the triad of Adam, Eve, and Lilith. Browning depicts Lilith and Eve as being friendly and complicitous with each other, as they sit together on either side of Adam. Under the threat of death, Eve admits that she never loved Adam, while Lilith confesses that she always loved him:

As the worst of the venom left my lips,
I thought, 'If, despite this lie, he strips
The mask from my soul with a kiss—I crawl
His slave,—soul, body, and all!

— Browning 1098

Browning focused on Lilith's emotional attributes, rather than that of her ancient demon predecessors.

Scottish author George MacDonald also wrote a fantasy novel entitled Lilith, first published in 1895. MacDonald employed the character of Lilith in service to a spiritual drama about sin and redemption, in which Lilith finds a hard-won salvation. Many of the traditional characteristics of Lilith mythology are present in the author's depiction: Long dark hair, pale skin, a hatred and fear of children and babies, and an obsession with gazing at herself in a mirror. MacDonald's Lilith also has vampiric qualities: she bites people and sucks their blood for sustenance.

Australian poet and scholar Christopher John Brennan (1870–1932), included a section titled "Lilith" in his major work "Poems: 1913" (Sydney: G. B. Philip and Son, 1914). The "Lilith" section contains thirteen poems exploring the Lilith myth and is central to the meaning of the collection as a whole.

C. L. Moore's 1940 story Fruit of Knowledge is written from Lilith's point of view. It is a re-telling of the Fall of Man as a love triangle between Lilith, Adam and Eve – with Eve's eating the forbidden fruit being in this version the result of misguided manipulations by the jealous Lilith, who had hoped to get her rival discredited and destroyed by God and thus regain Adam's love.

British poet John Siddique's 2011 collection Full Blood has a suite of 11 poems called The Tree of Life, which features Lilith as the divine feminine aspect of God. A number of the poems feature Lilith directly, including the piece Unwritten which deals with the spiritual problem of the feminine being removed by the scribes from The Bible.

Lilith is also mentioned in The Lion, the Witch and the Wardrobe, by C. S. Lewis. The character Mr. Beaver ascribes the ancestry of the main antagonist, Jadis the White Witch, to Lilith.

Lilith is a poem by Vladimir Nabokov, written in 1928. Many have connected it to Lolita, but Nabokov adamantly denies this: "Intelligent readers will abstain from examining this impersonal fantasy for any links with my later fiction."

In Samuel de Ceccatty's 2022 British adult animated short film Lilith & Eve, Eve leaves Eden to learn about Lilith despite Adam's protests.

=== In American media ===
Lilith: A Dramatic Poem is a four-act medieval fantasy verse drama written in blank verse by American poet and playwright George Sterling, first published in 1919. Influential critic H. L. Mencken said of Sterling: "I think his dramatic poem Lilith was the greatest thing he ever wrote." The New York Times declared Lilith "the finest thing in poetic drama yet done in America and one of the finest poetic dramas yet written in English." Author Theodore Dreiser said: "It rings richer in thought than any American dramatic poem with which I am familiar." Poet Clark Ashton Smith wrote: "Lilith is certainly the best dramatic poem in English since the days of Swinburne and Browning. ... The lyrics interspersed throughout the drama are as beautiful as any by the Elizabethans."

German-American poet Elsa von Freytag-Loringhoven's 1919 poem King Adam, originally published in The Little Review in May 1919, "gives voice to the biblical character of Lilith ... as she celebrates the sex act in sensuous detail".

Lilith is a 1961 novel by J. R. Salamanca that tells the story of a man, Vincent, who is seduced by a schizophrenic woman named Lilith. It explores themes of love, obsession, and blurred lines between fantasy and reality. A feature film of the same name written by Robert Rossen and starring Jean Seberg and Warren Beatty was released in 1964.

In the role playing game series Vampire the Masquerade, Lilith plays a major part in the mythology within the games.

2018's Chilling Adventures of Sabrina television series features a version of Madam Satan that is portrayed as, and revealed to be, Lilith.

In the 2019 adult animated series Hazbin Hotel, Lilith is depicted as the wife of Lucifer and the queen of Hell. Charlie, the protagonist of the series, is Lilith's daughter. According to The Washington Times, Hazbin Hotel subverts traditional narratives of Lucifer and Lilith by presenting their betrayal of God as heroic and noble.

In the Diablo series of video games, Lilith is depicted as the daughter of Mephisto and the creator of the game's world alongside her lover, the angel Inarius. Lilith serves as the main antagonist in Diablo IV.

"Lilith" is a 2022 song by American singer-songwriter Saint Avangeline off her debut album Gardener of Eden. The song went viral on TikTok and Instagram, gaining over 56 million streams. This haunting track explored her experience with toxic relationships and sexual assault using the character of Lilith as a symbol for both beauty and danger. Saint shared that she wrote "Lilith" "to try to cope and heal, and since then, my inspiration has mostly come from a desperate place of trying to get everything out of my system."

== In Western esotericism ==
The sigil of Lilith

The depiction of Lilith in Romanticism continues to be popular among Wiccans and in other modern occultism. A few magical orders dedicated to the undercurrent of Lilith, featuring initiations specifically related to the arcana of the "first mother", exist. Two organisations that use initiations and magic associated with Lilith are the Ordo Antichristianus Illuminati and the Order of Phosphorus. Lilith appears as a succubus in Aleister Crowley's De Arte Magica. Lilith was also one of the middle names of Crowley's first child, Nuit Ma Ahathoor Hecate Sappho Jezebel Lilith Crowley (1904–1906), and Lilith is sometimes identified with Babalon in Thelemic writings. Many early occult writers who contributed to modern day Wicca expressed special reverence for Lilith. Charles Leland associated Aradia with Lilith: Aradia, says Leland, is Herodias, who was regarded in stregheria folklore as being associated with Diana as chief of the witches. Leland further notes that Herodias is a name that comes from west Asia, where it denoted an early form of Lilith.

Gerald Gardner asserted that there was continuous historical worship of Lilith to present day, and that her name is sometimes given to the goddess being personified in the coven by the priestess. This idea was further attested by Doreen Valiente, who cited her as a presiding goddess of the Craft: "the personification of erotic dreams, the suppressed desire for delights". Valiente also falls prey to the misindentification of the Burney Relief as Lilith. She identifies Lilith as a 'moon goddess' as well as a patroness of witches.

In some contemporary concepts, Lilith is viewed as the embodiment of the Goddess, a designation that is thought to be shared with what these faiths believe to be her counterparts: Inanna, Ishtar, Asherah, Anath, Anahita and Isis. According to one view, Lilith was originally a Sumerian, Babylonian, or Hebrew mother goddess of childbirth, children, women, and sexuality.

Raymond Buckland holds that Lilith is a dark moon goddess on par with the Hindu Kali.^{210}

Many theistic Satanists consider Lilith a goddess, with some recognizing her as the patron of strong women and women's rights. Lilith is popular among theistic Satanists because of her association with Satan and is most often worshipped by women, but not exclusively. Some Satanists believe that she is married to Satan and thus think of her as a mother figure. Others base their reverence for her on her history as a succubus and praise her as a sex goddess. A different approach to a Satanic Lilith holds that she was once a fertility and agricultural goddess.

The Western mystery tradition associates Lilith with the qlippoth of Kabbalah. Dion Fortune writes, "The Virgin Mary is reflected in Lilith", and that Lilith is the source of "lustful dreams".

Lilith is a source of veneration within the Luciferian tradition of Michael W. Ford. The research and esoteric development of modern Luciferianism recognizes Lilith as equal to Samael, composing the symbol of the "Adversary". Lilith is the central topic of study in Michael W. Ford's "Lilith and Lamastu: Legends of the Ancient Abyss", which explores the Western mystery tradition within a Luciferian perspective. The Mesopotamian 3rd to 8th century Aramaic Incantation bowls, hold a good deal of lore concerning the many different types of Lilith-spirits and the depictions of Lilith, yet also the associations between the King of Demons, Bagdana. The modern aim of Luciferian magick with concern to Lilith, utilizes methods of seeking the nocturnal energies inherent in humanity and is directed towards beneficial workings.

The most popular iteration of the Sigil of Lilith, designed in the style of those of the Lesser Key of Solomon, appeared in 2007 by controversial contemporary occultist, Robin Artisson.

== See also ==
- Abyzou – a Near Eastern demon blamed for miscarriages and infant mortality
- Agrat bat Mahalath – mother of demons
- Ardat-lilî – Mesopotamian wind demon associated with disease
- Black Moon Lilith – an astrological and mathematical point
- Eisheth Zenunim – Woman of Whoredom, epithet of Lilith
- Gello – Greek and Byzantine demon
- Incubus – a type of seductive male demon
- Lamashtu – Mesopotamian demon goddess of infant mortality
- Lamia – Greek demon of infant mortality
- Lilin – male parallels and children of Lilith
- Lilu (mythology) – Mesopotamian wind demon associated with disease
- Lailah – a Jewish angel, whose name means "night", believed to protect in pregnancy
- Lilith Fair – a travelling music festival
- Mahalath (demon) – queen of demons
- Naamah (demon) – queen of demons
- Nocnitsa – Slavic nightmare demon
- Norea – a Gnostic figure
- Strix (mythology) – Greco-Roman owl demon
- Succubus – a type of seductive female demon
