= 4Q510–511 =

Hebrew manuscript in the Dead Sea Scrolls

4Q510–511, also given the title Songs of the Sage or Songs of the Maskil (שירי משכיל "instructor"), is a fragmentary Hebrew-language manuscript of a Jewish magical text of incantation and exorcism in the Dead Sea Scrolls, specifically for protection against a list of demons. It is notable for containing the first clear usage of the Hebrew (or Aramaic) term lilith in relation to a supernatural creature. It is comparable to Aramaic incantation 4Q560 and also 11Q11.

== Physical state of the scrolls ==
There are two versions of Songs of the Sage, traditionally titled Songs of the Sage^{a} (4Q510) and Songs of the Sage^{b} (4Q511). The text is highly fragmentary, with portions of only eleven out of twenty-one columns extant. There are seven extant fragments of Songs of the Sage^{a} and 215 of Songs of the Sage^{b}. There is some disagreement about how these fragments should be ordered.

== Date and provenance ==
Based on paleographical considerations the scroll is usually dated to the late first century BCE. Its terminology indicates that it is a sectarian composition.

== Cosmology ==
The text assumes that the world is populated with evil angels under the dominion of Beliel, a figure (like Satan) of ultimate personified evil. The Instructor of the community is charged with reciting the words of this liturgy to keep these forces at bay: "And I, the Instructor, proclaim His glorious splendor so as to frighten and to te[rify] all the spirits of the destroying angels, spirits of the bastards, demons, Lilith, howlers, and [desert dweller...] and those which fall upon men without warning to lead them astray from a spirit of understanding."

== Connection to other liturgical texts among the Dead Sea Scrolls ==
The text contains several phrases that appear also in other Qumran liturgies, such as Songs of the Sabbath Sacrifice and Berakhot (4Q286 and 4Q287). Some themes – especially those of the Instructor positioning himself as a lowly and sinful person – appear also in the Thanksgiving Hymns.
