= Alphabet of Sirach =

Medieval acrostic composed of 44 proverbs

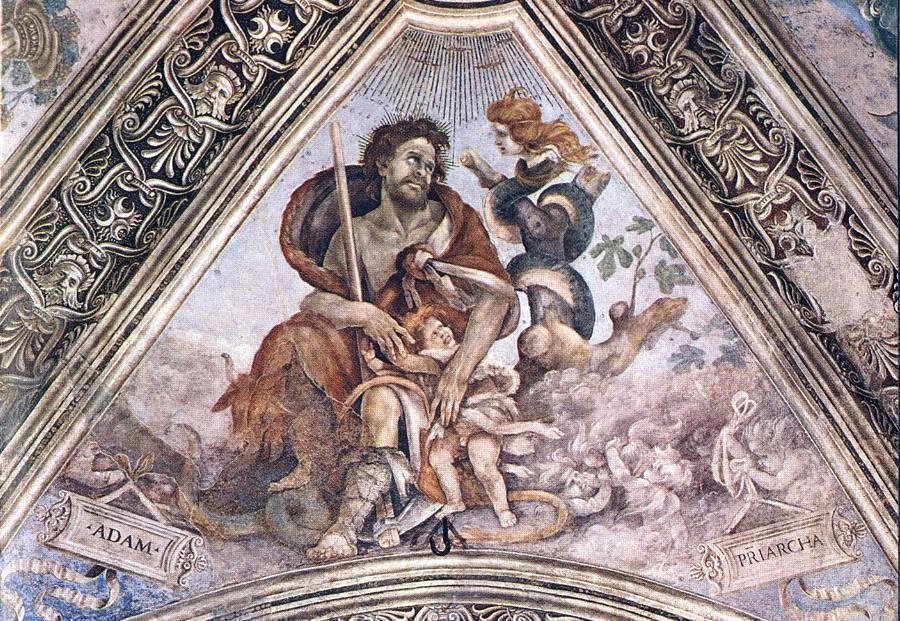
Adam clutches a child in the presence of the child-snatcher Lilith.

The Alphabet of Sira (Jewish Babylonian Aramaic: אלפא־ביתא דבן סירא, romanized: Alpā-Bethā də-Ben Sirā) is an anonymous text of the Middle Ages inspired by the Book of Sirach and written in the Islamic world between 700 and 1000. It is a compilation of two lists of proverbs, 22 in Jewish Babylonian Aramaic and 22 in Medieval Hebrew, both arranged as alphabetic acrostics. Each proverb is followed by an aggadic commentary. Adolf Neubauer and Abraham Epstein argued for a satirical character, which reading was rejected by Louis Ginzberg.

It has been translated into Latin, Yiddish, Judaeo-Spanish, Judeo-Persian, French and German. An English translation by Norman Bronznick appeared in Stern and Mirsky (1998). A critical edition under the title סיפורי בן סירא בימי הביניים was published by Eli Yassif in 1984.

== Aramaic proverbs ==
The Aramaic proverbs are the older part of the book. Five of them can be traced to Talmudic-Midrashic literature. The Hebrew commentary, illustrating the proverbs with fables, is much younger.

In the reading of Ginzberg:

1. "Honor the physician before thou hast need of him", (Sirach 38:1)
2. "If a son do not conduct himself like a son, let him float on the water."
3. "Gnaw the bone that falls to thy lot whether it be good or bad."
4. "Gold must be hammered, and the child must be beaten."
5. "Be good and refuse not thy portion of good."
6. "Woe to the wicked man and woe to his companions."
7. "Cast thy bread upon the waters and upon the land, for thou shalt find it after many days" (Eccles. 11:1)
8. "Hast thou seen a black ass? [Then] it was neither black nor white."
9. "Bestow no good upon that which is evil, and no evil will befall thee."
10. "Restrain not thy hand from doing good."
11. "The bride enters the bridal chamber and, nevertheless, knows not what will befall her."
12. "A nod to the wise is sufficient; the fool requires a blow." (Proverbs 22:15)
13. "He who honors them that despise him is like an ass."
14. "A fire, when it is kindled, burns many sheaves" (James 3:5)
15. "An old woman in the house is a good omen in the house"
16. "Even a good surety has to be applied to for a hundred morrows; a bad one for a hundred thousand."
17. "Rise quickly from the table and thou wilt avoid disputes."
18. "In thy business, deal only with the upright."
19. "If the goods are near at hand, the owner consumes them; but if they are at a distance, they consume him."
20. "Do not disavow an old friend."
21. "Thou mayest have sixty counselors, but do not give up thy own opinion"
22. "He that was first satisfied and then hungry will offer thee his hand; but not he that was first hungry and then satisfied."

== The second Alphabet ==
The 22 Hebrew proverbs are quite different in character from the Aramaic ones, and much more recent. Half of the proverbs are borrowed from the Talmud, and are only a pretext for the presentation of a number of legends surrounding Ben Sira. Ben Sira is presented as the son of Jeremiah, born to the prophet's own daughter who dipped in a mikveh into which Jeremiah was previously forced to lay seed. Ben Sira's fame reached Nebuchadnezzar II, who called him to his court. Nebuchadnezzar sets forth various ordeals for Ben Sira, who responds with 22 stories.

== Lilith narrative ==
The book is known for having the first depiction of Lilith as a singular mythological figure.

== Editions ==
- Salonica, 1514, two known surviving copies
- Constantinople, 1519, one known complete copy in the British Library, a defective one at the Bodleian, and another defective one in Basel.
- Venice, 1544, reprinted by Steinschneider, 1854; most later editions are based on this one.

== Sources ==
- Eisenstein, J.D., Alpha Beta Ben Sira, in: Otsar Midrashim vol. 1 (1915).
- Steinschneider, Moritz Alphabeticum Syracidis, Berlin (1854).
- Steinschneider, Moritz Alphabeticum Syracidis utrumque, cum expositione antiqua (narrationes et fabulas continente), Berlin (1858).
- David Stern, Mark Jay Mirsky (eds.), Rabbinic Fantasies: Imaginative Narratives from Classical Hebrew Literature, Yale Judaica Series (1998). ISBN 0-300-07402-6
- Taylor, C., The Alphabet of Ben Sira, in: JQR 17 (1904/05) 238–239.
- Taylor, C., The Alphabet of Ben Sira, in: Journal of Philology 30 (1907) 95–132.
- Tobias Lachs, Samuel, The Alphabet of Ben Sira, Gratz College Annual of Jewish Studies 11 (1973), 9-28.
