= Jean de Pauly =

Jean de Pauly (Albania, 1860 – Lyon, 1903) was the translator of French editions of the portions of the Talmud and the first complete translation of the Zohar. He sometimes signed his works "Pavly." Born in Albania, he earned his doctorat ès lettres in Palermo, then lived at Basel, Lyon, where he appears to have been a teacher at the School of the Sacred Heart, then Rome, Orleans, Turin, before returning to die in poverty in Lyon. In his last years he was occupied with the translation of the Zohar, proposed to Pauly by France's biggest paper manufacturer, the Catholic Émile Lafuma-Giraud, and published 1906–11. His Zohar translation was criticised by Gershom Scholem for falsifying the book's content.

== Works ==
- Chosen-Mispat: Oder Civil und Strafrecht Des Judenthums (1893) Jean De Pavly
- Le Faux Pape ou les effrontés fin de siècle stigmatisés et livrés à l'indignation et au mépris des honnêtes gens Jean de Pavly, 1895 Marseille, Imprimerie méridionale, 32p.
- La Cité juive 1898
- Le Manuel du ménage israélite 1899 – a mixture of serious and fantasy.
- (extracts from) Le Talmud de Babylone 1888 and 1900
- Sepher ha-Zohar (Le livre de la splendeur): Jean de Pavly. posth. 1906–1911
- Paul Vulliaud ed. and notes. Etudes et correspondence de Jean de Pauly relatives au Sepher ha-Zohar. Paris 1933
