= Aphedron =

Greek noun; former hapax legomenon

The Greek noun aphedron (ἀφεδρών) is a term for "latrine". The word occurs twice in the New Testament (Matthew 15:17 and Mark 7:19) but was unknown in classical texts. The Latin Vulgate rendered the term secessus 'latrine'. Wycliffe avoided the reference to a privy with "and beneath it goeth out", while Martin Luther translated the word as natürliche Gang ("natural course"), though Tyndale's "and goeth out into the draught" is clearer. Perhaps due in part to Luther's "natural course", various 18th- and 19th-century scholars assumed that the word was a euphemism for the human bowel. However, in 1901 the discovery and publication of an inscription at Pergamon confirmed that the word does, as per secessus, in fact mean "latrine".

The Mark 7:19 verse translates as "out into the aphedron, cleaning all meats" which makes no sense if the meat is still lodged in the lower intestine.

== Inscription ==
The following is a transcription and translation of the relevant fragment of the Greek text known in Latin as Lex de astynomis Pergamenorum and in English as Law of the town clerks of Pergamon.

483.220

ΑΦΕΔΡΩΝΩΝ
{concerning toilets}
Concerning toilets.

ΟΙ ΑΣΤΥΝΟΜΟΙ ΕΠΙΜΕΛΕΙΑΝ ΠΟΙΕΙΣΘΩΣΑΝ ΤΩΝ ΤΕ ΔΗΜΟΣΙΩΝ ΑΦΕΔΡΩΝΩΝ
the {town clerks} {care.F.ACC} {shall make} {of the} both public toilets
The town clerks shall maintain the public toilets and their outpipes.

ΚΑΙ ΤΩΝ ΕΞ ΑΥΤΩΝ ΥΠΟΝΟΜΩΝ ΚΑΙ ΕΑΝ ΤΙΝΕΣ ΜΗ ΣΤΕΓΝΟΙ ΥΠΑΡΧΩΣΙΝ ΚΑΙ ΤΩΝ...
and {of the} {out of} them sewers.PL and if some not covers/lids exist and {of the}...
And if some of them are not covered and of them...(text broken thereafter)
