= University Challenge 2014–15 =

British television quiz programme

Series 44 of University Challenge began on 14 July 2014 on BBC Two. This was the 21st series to be broadcast on the BBC. It was won by the team from Gonville and Caius College, Cambridge.

The Courtauld Institute of Art made its first ever University Challenge appearance in this series.

== Results ==
- Winning teams are highlighted in **bold**.
- Teams with green scores (winners) returned in the next round, while those with red scores (losers) were eliminated.
- Teams with orange scores had to win one more match to return in the next round (current highest scoring losers, teams that won their first quarter-final match, teams that won their second quarter-final match having lost their first, or teams that won their first quarter-final match and lost their second).
- Teams with yellow scores indicate that two further matches had to be played and won (teams that lost their first quarter-final match).
- A score in italics indicates a match decided on a tie-breaker question.

=== First round ===
Team 1	Score		Team 2	Total	Broadcast date
University of Manchester	160	190	**Selwyn College, Cambridge**	350	14 July 2014
**Oxford Brookes University**	130	120	Jesus College, Oxford	250	21 July 2014
**University of Bristol**	190	75	Courtauld Institute of Art	265	28 July 2014
St Anne's College, Oxford	105	305	**Gonville and Caius College, Cambridge**	410	11 August 2014
**St Peter's College, Oxford**	205	150	University of Sussex	355	18 August 2014
**London School of Hygiene & Tropical Medicine**	150	140	London School of Economics	290	25 August 2014
**University of Liverpool**	155	130	University of Sheffield	285	1 September 2014
University of Bath	120	190	**University of Glasgow**	310	8 September 2014
**University of Leicester**	245	190	The Open University	435	15 September 2014
**Trinity College, Cambridge**	150	100	University of St Andrews	250	22 September 2014
**University College London**	230	140	University of Exeter	370	29 September 2014
Brasenose College, Oxford	35	250	**Durham University**	285	6 October 2014
Corpus Christi College, Cambridge	135	170	**University of York**	305	13 October 2014
**Magdalen College, Oxford**	220	110	Pembroke College, Cambridge	330	20 October 2014

==== Highest Scoring Losers play-offs ====
Team 1	Score		Team 2	Total	Broadcast Date
**The Open University**	180	140	London School of Economics	320	27 October 2014
**University of Manchester**	210	95	University of Sussex	305	3 November 2014

=== Second round ===
Team 1	Score		Team 2	Total	Broadcast date
University of Leicester	140	220	**Trinity College, Cambridge**	360	10 November 2014
**Durham University**	210	160	University of York	370	17 November 2014
**Magdalen College, Oxford**	225	130	The Open University	355	24 November 2014
**Gonville and Caius College, Cambridge**	200	135	University of Manchester	335	1 December 2014
London School of Hygiene & Tropical Medicine	135	160	**University of Bristol**	295	8 December 2014
University of Glasgow	105	170	**University of Liverpool**	275	15 December 2014
Selwyn College, Cambridge	100	235	**St Peter's College, Oxford**	335	5 January 2015
**Oxford Brookes University**	180	90	University College London	270	12 January 2015

=== Quarter-finals ===
Team 1	Score		Team 2	Total	Broadcast date
University of Bristol	115	175	**University of Liverpool**	290	19 January 2015
**St Peter's College, Oxford**	240	80	Oxford Brookes University	320	26 January 2015
Durham University	95	275	**Gonville and Caius College, Cambridge**	370	2 February 2015
**Magdalen College, Oxford**	315	55	Trinity College, Cambridge	370	9 February 2015
University of Liverpool	100	245	**St Peter's College, Oxford**	345	16 February 2015
Oxford Brookes University	85	150	**University of Bristol**	235	23 February 2015
**Gonville and Caius College, Cambridge**	215	155	Magdalen College, Oxford	370	2 March 2015
**Durham University**	145	105	Trinity College, Cambridge	250	9 March 2015
University of Bristol	115	250	**Magdalen College, Oxford**	365	16 March 2015
University of Liverpool	100	175	**Durham University**	275	23 March 2015

=== Semi-finals ===
Team 1	Score		Team 2	Total	Broadcast date
St Peter's College, Oxford	120	235	**Magdalen College, Oxford**	355	30 March 2015
**Gonville and Caius College, Cambridge**	170	75	Durham University	245	6 April 2015

=== Final ===
Team 1	Score		Team 2	Total	Broadcast date
Magdalen College, Oxford	105	255	**Gonville and Caius College, Cambridge**	360	13 April 2015

- The trophy and title were awarded to the Gonville & Caius Cambridge team of Ted Loveday, Michael Taylor, Anthony Martinelli, and Jeremy Warner. Loveday later claimed that he had "learned his answers on Wikipedia".
- The trophy was presented by Will Self, who claimed to have known "about 35%" of the answers.

== Spin-off: Christmas Special 2014 ==
Each year, a Christmas special sequence is aired featuring distinguished alumni. Out of 7 first-round winners, the top 4 highest-scoring teams progress to the semi-finals. The teams consist of celebrities who represent their alma maters.

=== Results ===
- Winning teams are highlighted in **bold**.
- Teams with green scores (winners) returned in the next round, while those with red scores (losers) were eliminated.
- Teams with grey scores won their match but did not achieve a high enough score to proceed to the next round.
- A score in italics indicates a match decided on a tie-breaker question.

First Round

Team 1	Score		Team 2	Total	Broadcast date
Lady Margaret Hall, Oxford	195	45	University of Warwick	240	20 December 2014
University of Hull	205	25	Newcastle University	230	23 December 2014
King's College, Cambridge	160	150	Royal Holloway, University of London	310	24 December 2014
University of Edinburgh	235	45	University of Leeds	280	25 December 2014
Trinity Hall, Cambridge	195	120	Balliol College, Oxford	315	26 December 2014
University of York	135	110	University of Surrey	245	29 December 2014
Manchester Metropolitan University	145	75	Goldsmiths, University of London	220	30 December 2014

==== Standings for the winners ====
Rank	Team	Team captain	Score
1	University of Edinburgh	Philippa Gregory	235
2	University of Hull	Jenni Murray	205
3=	Lady Margaret Hall, Oxford	Cathy Newman	195
3=	Trinity Hall, Cambridge	Adam Mars-Jones	195
5	King's College, Cambridge	Noreena Hertz	160
6	Manchester Metropolitan University	Bernard Hill	145
7	University of York	Michael Dixon	135

Semi-finals

Team 1	Score		Team 2	Total	Broadcast date
Lady Margaret Hall, Oxford	145	175	**University of Hull**	320	31 December 2014
University of Edinburgh	135	165	**Trinity Hall, Cambridge**	300	1 January 2015

Final

Team 1	Score		Team 2	Total	Broadcast date
University of Hull	65	215	**Trinity Hall, Cambridge**	280	2 January 2015

The winning Trinity Hall, Cambridge team of Tom James, Emma Pooley, Adam Mars-Jones and Dan Starkey beat the University of Hull and their team of Rosie Millard, Malcolm Sinclair, Jenni Murray and Stan Cullimore.
