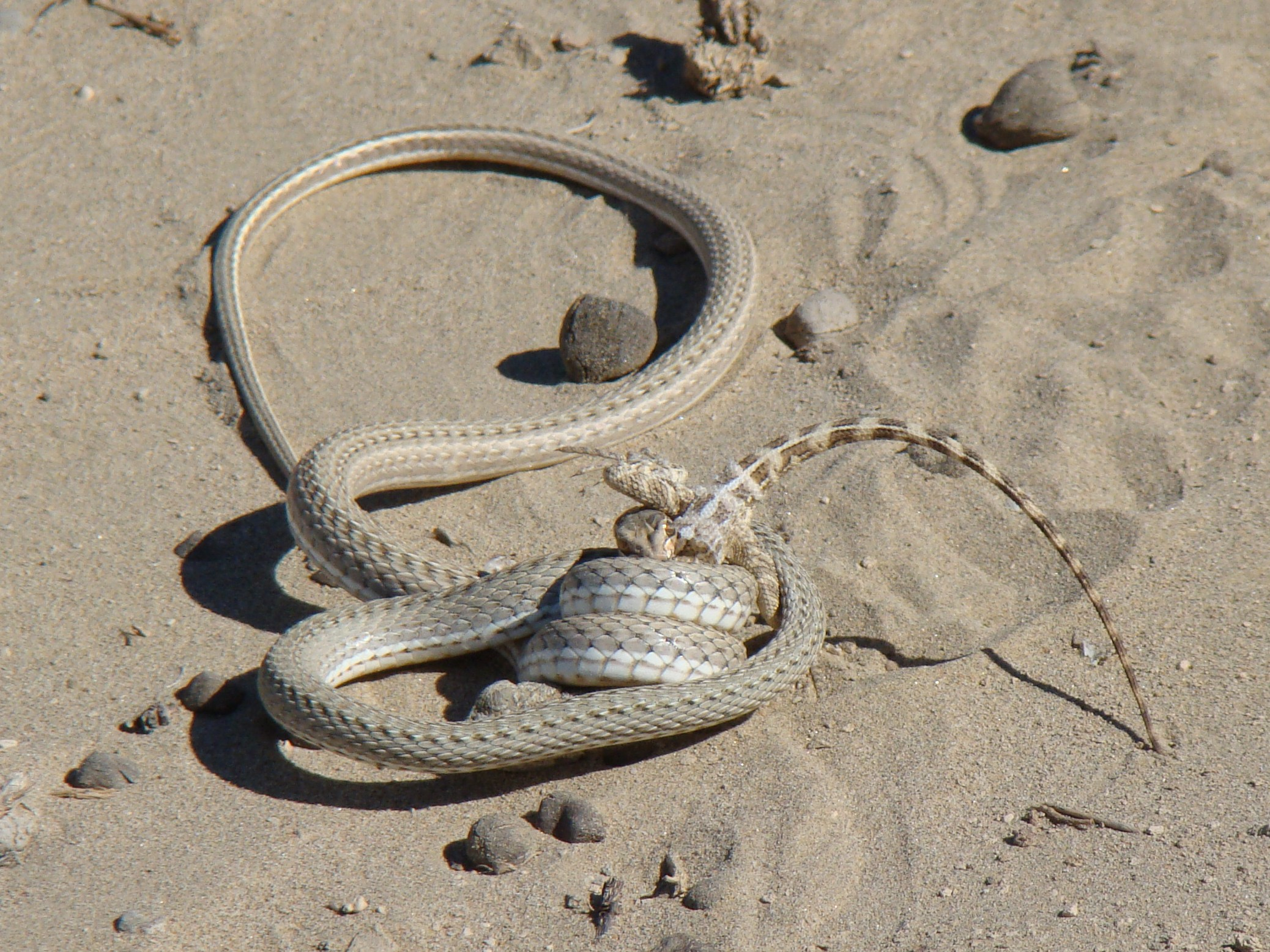
- Psammophis lineolatus eating a lizard

Scientific classification
- Kingdom: Animalia
- Phylum: Chordata
- Order: Squamata
- Suborder: Serpentes
- Family: Psammophiidae
- Genus: Psammophis
- Species: P. lineolatus

Binomial name
- Psammophis lineolatus (Brandt, 1838)

= Psammophis lineolatus =

Species of snake

Psammophis lineolatus, commonly known as steppe ribbon racer or arrow snake, is a species of mildly venomous snake (not harmful to humans) in the family Lamprophiidae. It is located in northern and central Asia, from north western China, Mongolia, Russia, Kazakhstan, Azerbaijan, Kyrgyzstan, Tajikistan, Turkmenistan, Uzbekistan, Afghanistan, Iran, and Pakistan. This snake has not been evaluated for conservation globally, but in Mongolia, it is categorized as Least Concern due to its large range and the fact that no decline in population has been detected.

== Description ==
The total length of the body reaches 91 cm. The front end of the muzzle is bluntly rounded. The narrow head slightly separated from the neck. The frontal shield is long and very narrow. The upper surface of the muzzle is concave or with a longitudinal groove. The cheekbone shield is long and narrow. There are 17 smooth scales around the middle of the body. The pupil is large. The anal flap divided. The tail is short. The color of the upper side of the body is olive-gray, sandy or brownish-gray; the edges of the scales are slightly lighter than their middle. Along the body are 4 dark longitudinal stripes with black edges, sometimes absent or are only narrow, sometimes dotted stripes. The stripes begin on the head shields. The belly is white with grayish, brownish or olive-grey spots, which in some cases merge into a continuous stripe running through the middle of the anterior third of the body.

== Reproduction ==
The arrow snake is an oviparous. Mating occurs in May and June. The female lays 3-11 strongly elongated eggs 30-55 mm long and 7.5—15 mm wide in late June and July. Young snakes with a body length of 25-330 mm appear in late July or August.
