= Yalkut Shimoni =

Compilation on books of the Hebrew Bible

The Yalkut Shimoni (Hebrew: ילקוט שמעוני), or simply Yalkut, is an aggadic compilation on the books of the Hebrew Bible. It is a compilation of older interpretations and explanations of Biblical passages, arranged according to the sequence of those portions of the Bible to which they referred.

Most of the text has been translated into German in 17 volumes (as of 7/2024) by Dagmar Börner-Klein.

== Contents ==
The individual elucidations form an organic whole only insofar as they refer to the same Biblical passage. Lengthy citations from ancient works are often abridged or are only partially quoted, the remainder being cited elsewhere. Since the interpretations of the ancient exegetes usually referred to several passages, and since Yalkut Shimoni endeavored to quote all such explanations, repetitions were inevitable, and aggadic sayings relating to two or more sections of the Bible were often duplicated. In many instances, however, only the beginning of such an explanation is given, the reader being referred to the passage in which it is recorded in its entirety.

== Order and arrangement ==
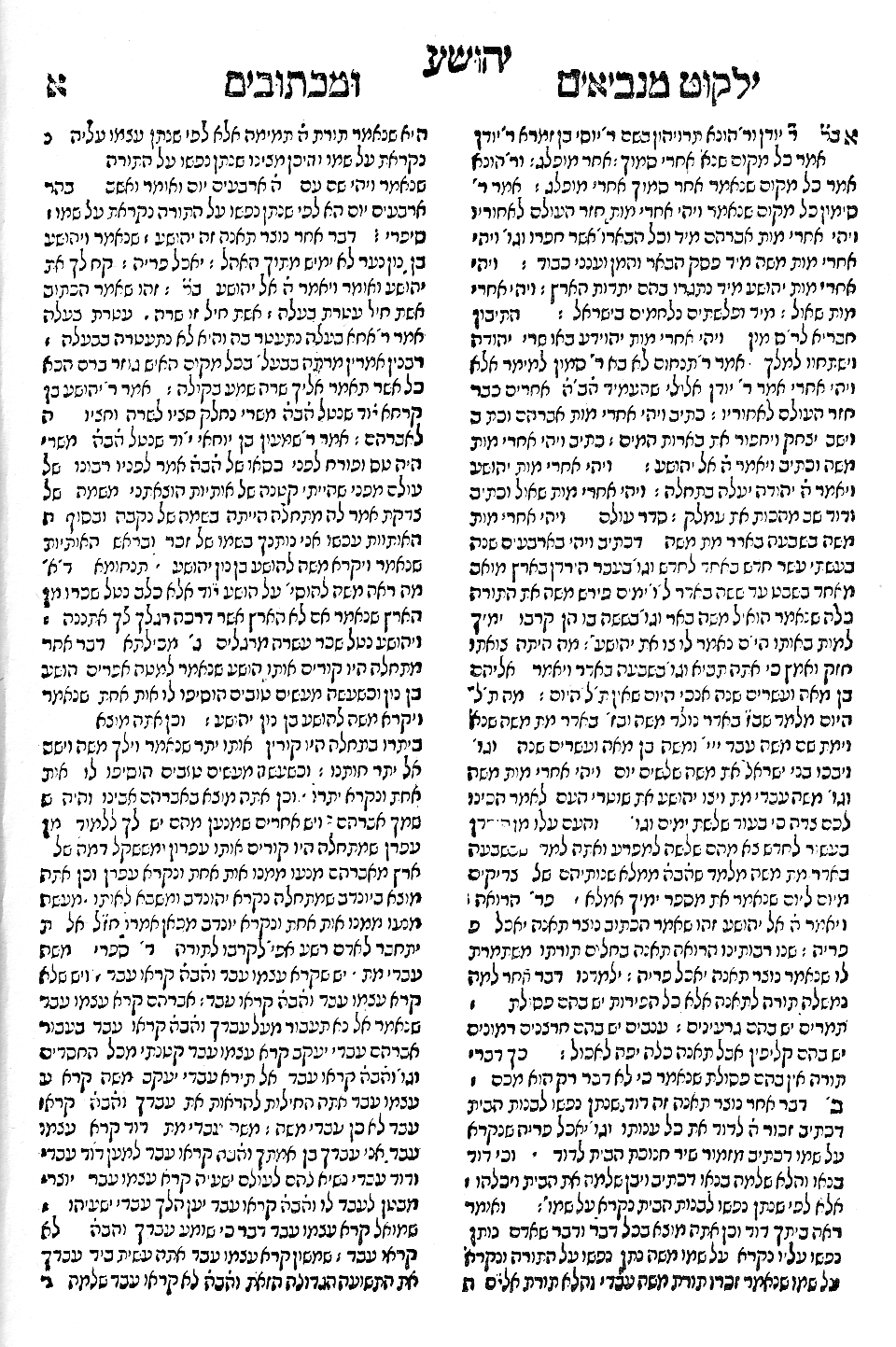
Title page from Yalkut Shimoni on Book of Joshua, facsimile of Salonique edition (1527).

The work contains two sections, which are numbered separately:

- The first part covers the Pentateuch and contains 963 sections as follows:
  - §§ 1–162 to Genesis
  - §§ 163–427 to Exodus
  - §§ 428–682 to Leviticus
  - §§ 683–788 to Numbers
  - §§ 789–963 to Deuteronomy
- The second part contains 1,085 sections, covering the Prophets and the Writings:
  - §§ 1-252 being devoted to the first prophets (Joshua, Judges, Samuel, and Kings)
  - §§ 253–335 to Book of Jeremiah
  - §§ 336–384 to Book of Ezekiel
  - §§ 385–514 to Book of Isaiah
  - §§ 515–595 to the twelve minor prophets
  - §§ 596–609 to Book of Ruth
  - §§ 610–890 to Psalms
  - §§ 891–928 to Book of Job
  - §§ 929–965 to Book of Proverbs
  - §§ 966–979 to Ecclesiastes
  - §§ 980–994 to the Song of Songs
  - §§ 995–1043 to Lamentations
  - §§ 1044–1059 to Book of Esther
  - §§ 1060–1066 to Book of Daniel
  - §§ 1067–1071 to Ezra and Nehemiah
  - §§ 1072–1085 to Book of Chronicles

The order of books follows the Talmudic order, except that Esther precedes Daniel, while the reverse order is followed in the Talmud.

The division into subsections (known in Hebrew as Remazim, sing. Remez) is arbitrary, and the sections are very unequal in length. For example, in the Vilna edition Deuteronomy 818 containing only five lines, while Deuteronomy 938 comprises eighteen columns.

Each passage, often in the text itself, indicates the sources from which the explanations are derived. In the Salonica edition they are given at the beginning of each corresponding Biblical passage, although in later editions they were placed in the margin. In many instances, however, the sources are given in an inconvenient place or are entirely eliminated, while some references are even indicated by a later redactor, as, for example, Job 921, where mention of the source (Exodus Rabbah) is a later addition, the original redactor being unacquainted with Exodus Rabbah.

== Sources ==
The sources embrace not only the major portion of halakhic and aggadic literature during the ancient and geonic epochs, but also the aggadic literature as late as the 12th century. The author made use of the older midrashic works, such as Seder 'Olam, Sifra, Sifre, Sifre Zuṭa, Mekilta, the Baraita on the Thirty-two Middot, the Baraita on the Forty-nine Middot, and the Baraita on the Erection of the Tabernacle ("Meleket ha-Mishkan"), and he availed himself also of the Mishnah, both Talmudim, and Semaḥot, Kallah, and Soferim.

He drew from the ethical and historical aggadah, such as Abot de-Rabbi Natan, Tanna debe Eliyahu (Rabbah and Zuṭa), Derech Eretz, Massechet Gan Eden, Midrash Vayisa'u, the Chronicle of Moses, and the Midrash on the Death of Moses. The author's chief source, however, was the explanatory midrashim, such as the Midrash rabbot on Pentateuch (with the exception of Exodus Rabbah), Pesiḳta, Pesikta Rabbati, Medrash Yelammedenu, Tanḥuma, Debarim Zuṭa, Midrashim Abba Gorion, Esfah, Tadshe, and Abkir; Pirḳe Rabbi Eli'ezer; and the midrashim on Samuel, Psalms, Proverbs, and Job.

The latter works are often cited simply as "Midrash," without any more definite identification. In that portion of Yalkut Shimoni which covers the books of Samuel, Psalms, and Proverbs, the term "Midrash" designates the midrash on the respective books. The term "Midrash" is used also to indicate the source of passages which belong to older or more recent works. In these few instances the author was apparently either uncertain of his references or he used an older collection known under the name of "Midrash," but did not have access to the original documents. It must also be borne in mind that the redactor failed to use various sources, such as the Midrash on the Ten Commandments and the Midrash on the Death of Aaron, and that he likewise ignored the Targumim and writings relating to esoteric doctrines, with the exception of the Otiyyot de-R. Akiba, to which he alludes in Genesis 1, § 1.

== Author and date ==
The author cannot be determined with certainty. The title-page of the Venice edition ascribes the composition of the work to Simeon of Frankfort, "the chief of exegetes" (rosh ha-darshanim), and this was accepted by David Conforte and Chaim Yosef David Azulai, who called him 'Simeon Ashkenazi of Frankfort'. Solomon Judah Loeb Rapoport, in Kerem Ḥemed, vii. 7 et seq., maintained that Simeon, the father of Joseph Kara, was its author in the 11th century, but this assertion is untenable, as the Yalkut Shimoni includes midrashim of a later date. If the Yalkut Shimoni was so old, it would be difficult to explain why Nathan ben Jehiel and Rashi fail to mention it.

Abraham Epstein inclines to agree with Leopold Zunz that the author of Yalkut Shimoni flourished in the early part of the 13th century. According to Zunz, the work was written by Simeon Kara, who lived in southern Germany at that period, and the title "ha-Darshan" was bestowed upon him probably at a later date. It is certain that a manuscript of the Yalkut Shimoni, mentioned by Azariah dei Rossi, existed in 1310; but despite this, there is scarcely any allusion to the work during the 14th and 15th centuries. This may be ascribed, however, to the unhappy position of the German Jews and to the repeated persecutions of the period; for peace and prosperity were necessary for the copying of so extensive a work, and the Jews of Germany had neither. After the beginning of the 15th century, on the other hand, the work must have been disseminated in foreign countries, for it was used by Spanish scholars of the latter half of that century, Isaac Abarbanel the first to mention it.

== Editions ==
=== Older editions ===
The editio princeps of the Yalkut Shimoni was printed in Salonica in 1521; the part relating to the Neviim and Ketuvim appeared first. The part relating to the Torah appeared between 1526 and 1527, and the entire work was later published in Venice (1566) with certain emendations and deviations from the Salonica edition. All later texts are merely reprints of the Venetian edition, with the exception of one published at Livorno (1650–1659), which contained additions and corrections and commentary by Abraham Gedaliah ben Asher of Aleppo. The latest text prior to 1900 (Vilna, 1898) is based on editions from Lublin, Venice, and Livorno and contains footnotes providing sources, a glossary of difficult words, and an index of the chapters and verses of Biblical passages. To this edition is appended a brief commentary by Avraham Gombiner of Kalisz entitled Zayit Ra'anan.

=== Current editions ===
- Yalkut Shimoni: Midrash al Torah, Neviim u-Khetuvim. Yarid ha-Sefarim, Jerusalem 2006
- Midrash Yalkut Shimoni: Torah, Nevi'im, u-Khetuvim. Machon HaMeor, Jerusalem 2001

== Translations ==
Dagmar Börner-Klein (ed.). Jalkut Schimoni: Rabbinische Bibelauslegung im Mittelalter.
