= Temurah =

Temurah may refer to:

- Temurah (Kabbalah), a method, used by the Kabbalists to rearrange words and sentences in the Bible;
- Temurah (Halacha), the prohibition against attempting to switch the sanctity of one animal for another;
- Temurah (Talmud), the Talmudic tractate dealing with the laws of Temurah (Halacha);
- Midrash Temurah (Hebrew: מדרש תמורה), one of the smaller midrashim, consisting of three chapters.
