= Simeon Kara =

Simeon ben Helbo Kara was a French rabbi who lived in Mans in the 11th century; brother of Menahem ben Helbo and father of Joseph Ḳara. Isaac de Lattes, in his Ḳiryat Sefer, counts Ḳara among the prominent French rabbis, although no work of his has survived. J.L. Rapoport identified him with the compiler of the Yalḳuṭ Shim'oni, on account of the similarity of some Midrashic quotations in this work with citations in Rashi's Bible commentary. Abraham Epstein has, however, shown that in the manuscripts the name "Ḳara" does not occur, and in place of "Simeon" the reading "Simson" at times is found.

The surname Ḳara is usually taken to be a professional name, meaning 'reader' or 'interpreter of the Bible'. Adolf Jellinek the Austrian rabbi and historian points out, however, that Ḳara, as contrasted with Derash, means the 'representative of the Peshaṭ'.
