= Hayyim Jacob Slutzki =

Ḥayyim Jacob ben Judah Löb Slutzki (Hebrew: חיים יעקב בן יהודה לייב סלוצקי) was a Russian rabbinical scholar who lived in the first half of the 19th century.

== Work ==
Slutzki authored Nite'e Na'amanim (Vilna, 1836), which contains the Midrash Konen accompanied by two commentaries. The first, Tserof ha-Kesef, provides explanations of the text and cites parallel passages from the Tanakh and the Talmud. The second, Beḥon ha-Zahav, consists of glosses on the text.

According to Fürst, Slutzki also wrote several works that remained unpublished, including:

- Pardes Rimmonim, a commentary on the Midrash Me ha-Shiloaḥ.
- Neḥpah ba-Kesef, a commentary on the Midrash Yonah.
- Retuḳot ha-Kesef, a commentary on Elijah of Vilna's Darkhe Eliyahu.
- Meassef ha-Maḥanot, a glossary of difficult words found in the Talmud and midrashim.
