= Midrash Abkir =

Midrash on Genesis and Exodus

Midrash Abkir (Hebrew: מדרש אבכיר) is one of the smaller midrashim, the extant remains of which consist of more than 50 excerpts contained in the Yalkut Shimoni and a number of citations in other works. It dealt, according to all accessible evidence, only with the first two books of the Pentateuch.

== Contents of the Midrash ==
=== Name and scope ===
Midrash Abkir derived its name from the formula אבכיר = אמן בימינו כן יהי רצון with which all these homilies closed, according to the testimony of R. Eleazar of Worms in a manuscript commentary on the prayer-book, and according to a codex of A. De Rossi. It is possible that these religious discourses were arranged in the order of the sedarim of Genesis and Exodus, the beginnings of the sedarim being Genesis 1:1, 2:4, 3:22, 6:9, 12:1, 17:1, 18:1, 22:1, 27:1, 44:18; Exodus 3:1, 16:4, and 25:1, to which belong the excerpts in Yalkut Shimoni, Genesis 4, 17, 34, 50, 63, 81, 82, 96, 120, 150, and Exodus 169, 258, and 361. If it may be assumed that in these homilies of Midrash Abkir the expositions are not confined to the first verses, the fact that certain passages are not connected with the beginning of any seder need cause no surprise.

=== Angelology ===
The language of this midrash is pure Hebrew, while its contents and discussions recall the works of the later haggadic period. As in the Pirḳe Rabbi Eli'ezer, angels are frequently mentioned. Shemḥasai (Samyaza) and Azael, according to the account in the Midrash Abkir, descended to earth to hallow the name of God in a degenerate world, but could not withstand the daughters of man. Shemḥasai was entrapped by the beauty of Istahar, who, through the marvelous might of the Divine Name, which she had elicited from him, ascended to heaven. As a reward for her virtue she was placed among the Pleiades, while the angel did penance before the Flood, and in punishment of his seduction of the daughters of men was suspended head downward between heaven and earth.

Azael, however, still wanders unreformed among mortals, and through dress and adornment seeks to mislead women. The version of this story in Yalkut Shimoni 44 concludes; "Therefore do the Israelites offer as a sacrifice on the Day of Atonement a ram [sic] to the Eternal One that He may forgive the sins of Israel, and a ram [sic] to Azazel that he may bear the sins of Israel, and this is the Azazel that is referred to in the Torah." This passage of the midrash explains the words of Yoma 67b: "According to the school of R. Ishmael, Azazel is he who atones for the deed of Usa and Azael."

In the editio princeps of the Yalkut Shimoni the source of the legend of the fallen angels (in § 44) as well as of the legend concerning the temptation of R. Mattithiah b. Ḥeresh by Satan (in § 161), who was successfully resisted by the pious hero, is simply the ordinary midrash, not the Midrash Abkir. The latter legend is found also in the Midrash of the Ten Commandments and in Tanḥuma.

In several other excerpts from the Yalkut Shimoni, which, according to later editions, are derived from the Midrash Abkir, the source is indicated in the first edition merely by the word "Midrash," as in § 241, which discusses the legend of Usa, the patron of Egypt; here "Midrash" apparently means "Midrash Wayosha". Yalkut Shimoni 235 (on Ex. 14:24) relates that the Egyptian magicians Jannes and Jambres obtained wings by their art and soared to heaven, but were dashed down into the sea by the angel Michael. It cannot be determined, however, whether this passage belongs to the fragment excerpted from the Midrash Abkir in Yalkut Shimoni 234.

== Use in later works ==
This midrash was known to the author of Shemot Rabbah, and was used or cited in the following works among others: Lekach Ṭob by R. Tobias b. Eliezer, Ha-Roḳeaḥ by Eleazar ben Judah of Worms, Pa'aneach Raza, the Ketab Tamim by Moses Taku, the Kad ha-Kemach of Bahya ben Asher, a manuscript commentary by a grandson of R. Samuel of Speier, and the Yalkut Re'ubeni. The entire midrash was likewise known to Azariah dei Rossi and to Abraham ibn Akra. The extracts in Yalkut Shimoni, which had been listed almost completely by Zunz, were collected by S. Buber and by Simon Chones. The legend of the two angels was also reprinted by Jellinek. Jannes and Jambres are mentioned also in Menachot 85a and Shemot Rabbah 9.
