= Smaller midrashim =

A number of midrashim exist which are smaller in size, and generally later in date, than those dealt with in the articles Midrash Haggadah and Midrash Halakah. Despite their late date, some of these works preserve material from the Apocrypha and Philo of Alexandria. These small works, were in turn used by later larger works, such as Sefer haYashar (midrash). Important editors and researchers of this material include Abraham ben Elijah of Vilna, Adolf Jellinek, and Solomon Aaron Wertheimer.

== Principal works ==
The chief of these works are:

- Midrash Abba Gorion, a late midrash to the Book of Esther
- Midrash Abkir, on the first two books of the Torah. Only fragments survive.
- Midrash Al Yithallel, stories about David, Solomon, and the rich Korah
- Midrash Aseret ha-Dibrot, a haggadah for Shavuot
- Chronicle of Moses (or Divrei ha-Yamim shel Mosheh)
- Midrash Eleh Ezkerah, on the execution of the ten sages by the Roman emperor Hadrian.
- Midrash Eser Galiyyot, the ten exiles of the Jews up to the time of Hadrian.
- Midrash Esfah, on verses from the books of Numbers and Deuteronomy. Only fragments survive.
- Midrash Hallel. See Midrash Tehillim
- Midrash Leku Nerannena, a collection for Hanukkah. Only fragments survive.
- Midrash Ma'aseh Torah, a compilation of doctrines and rules.
- Midrash Petirat Aharon, a telling of the death of Aaron.
- Midrash Petirat Mosheh, a telling of the death of Moses.
- Midrash Taame Haserot ve-Yeterot, inferences from the presence or not of matres lectionis, and about qere and ketiv.
- Midrash Tadshe (also called Baraita de-Rabbi Pinchas ben Yair), on the symbolism of the Tabernacle, and various symbolic numbers.
- Midrash Temurah (called by Me'iri Midrash Temurot), on duality in the natural world.
- Midrash Veyechulu, on several books of the Torah. Only citations survive.
- Midrash Vayisau, a story of the sons of Jacob, warring against their enemies.
- Midrash Vayosha, an aggadah for the seventh day of Passover.

== Survey of Collections ==
The more recent (circa 1900) collections of small midrashim referred to above and in Midrash Haggadah are the following:

- A. Jellinek, B. H. parts i.-iv., Leipsic, 1853–57; parts v.-vi., Vienna, 1873–78;
- Ḥayyim M. Horowitz, Agadat Agadot, etc., Berlin, 1881;
- idem, Bet 'Eḳed ha-Agadot: Bibliotheca Haggadica, 2 parts, Frankfort-on-the-Main, 1881;
- idem, Kebod Ḥuppah, ib. 1888;
- idem, Tosefta Attiḳta: Uralte Tosefta's, i.-v., ib. 1889–90;
- S. A. Wertheimer, Batte Midrashot, i.-iv., Jerusalem, 1893–97;
- idem, Leḳeṭ Midrashim, ib. 1903;
- L. Grünhut, Sefer ha-Liḳḳuṭim, Sammlung Aelterer Midraschim. etc., i-vi., ib. 1898–1903; comp. also Abraham Wilna, Rab Pe'alim, ed. S. Chones, pp. 133 et seq., H. L. Strack, in Herzog-Hauck, Real-Encyc. s.v. "Midrasch."

== Other small midrashim and mystical literature ==
In these collections, especially in A. Jellinek's Bet ha-Midrash, there are many small midrashim, either edited there for the first time or reprinted, as well as a number of works under other names, a discussion of which belongs rather to an article on mystic literature. The following treatises, however, may be mentioned here, the titles being given for the most part according to Jellinek:

- Agadat Mashiaḥ (Haggadah of the Messiah; ib. iii. 141 et seq.).
- Baraita Ma'ase Bereshit (in S. Chones' addenda to Abraham Wilna's Rab Pe'alim, pp. 47 et seq.); also Seder Rabbah de-Bereshit (in Wertheimer, l.c. i. 1-31).
- Gan 'Eden we-Gehinnom (Paradise and Hell; ib. v. 42 et seq.).
- Ma'aseh R. Yehoshua' b. Levi (History of R. Joshua b. Levi; ib. ii. 48 et seq.).
- Midrash Konen (in B. H. ii. 23–39);
- Be-Ḥokmah Yasad (Divine Wisdom; ib. v. 63–69)
- Masseket Gehinnom (Tractate of Gehenna; ib. i. 147–149)
- Milḥamot ha-Mashiaḥ (War of the Messiah; ib. vi. 117 et seq.)
- Misterot R. Shim'on b. Yoḥai (Mysteries of R. Simeon b. Yoḥai; ib. iii. 78 et seq.).
- Otiyot de-Rabbi Aḳiba (Alphabetical Midrash of R. Akiba; first and second recensions in B. H. iii. 12–64; comp. ib. v. 31–33; vi., p. xl.; Wertheimer, l.c. ii. 23 et seq.)
- Hekalot Rabbati (Great Hekalot; in B. H. iii. 83–108);
- Masseket Hekalot (Tractate Hekalot; ib. ii. 40–47; comp. also ib. i. 58 et seq., iii. 161 et seq., vi. 109 et seq.);
- Baraita Ma'ase Merkabah (in Wertheimer, l.c. ii. 15–25).
- Otiyot Mashiaḥ (Signs of the Messiah; ib. ii. 58–63).
- Pirḳe Eliyahu (Sections Concerning the Messiah; ib. iii. 68 et seq.).
- Seder Gan 'Eden (Description of Paradise; ib. ii. 52 et seq.; second recension, ib. iii. 131–140; additions, ib. 194–198).
- Sefer Eliyahu (Apocalypse of Elijah; ib. iii. 65 et seq.).
- Sefer Zerubbabel (Book of Zerubbabel; ib. ii. 54–57; comp. also Wertheimer, l.c. ii. 25 et seq., 29 et seq.).

== Bibliography ==
- Jacob Elbaum. The Hebrew Narrative Anthology in the Middle Ages Prooftexts (2004) pp. 176ff.
