= Midrash Al Yithallel =

Midrash Al Yithallel (Hebrew: מדרש אל יתהלל) is a small midrash containing stories from the lives of the wise Solomon, the mighty David, and the rich Korah, illustrating Jeremiah 9:23, hence the title:

Thus said the Lord: Let not the wise man glory in his wisdom (אל יתהלל חכם בחכמתו); Let not the strong man glory in his strength (ואל יתהלל הגבור בגבורתו); Let not the rich man glory in his riches (אל יתהלל עשיר בעשרו). But only in this should one glory: In his earnest devotion to Me. For I the Lord act with kindness, justice, and equity in the world; For in these I delight —declares the Lord.

The text has been published according to a manuscript at Munich by A. Jellinek, and according to a manuscript from Yemen by Grünhut, with valuable references to sources and parallels. The story of Solomon may be compared the passage cited in Jellinek; the history of David is similar to the midrash of Goliath; and that of Korach to the passage in the Midrash Tehillim.
