= Midrash Maaseh Torah =

Midrash Maaseh Torah (Hebrew: מדרש מעשי תורה) is one of the smaller midrashim, and contains compilations of doctrines, regulations of conduct, and empirical rules, arranged in groups of three to ten each and taken from various works. It is frequently found in manuscript, and has been edited at Constantinople (1519), Venice (1544), Amsterdam (1697), and elsewhere, while it has appeared more recently in A. Jellinek's B. H. (ii. 92–101) and is contained also in the Kol Bo (§ 118), where it frequently deviates from the Amsterdam edition even in the arrangement of its sentences.

== Authorship and Versions ==
The fact that this midrash is ascribed to the patriarch R. Judah ha-Nasi (Rabbenu haKadosh) receives its explanation from the fact that the Ma'aseh Torah is merely another recension of the similar midrash found in the edition of Schönblum and in Grünhut's Sefer ha-Liḳḳuṭim. This latter midrash begins in both editions with the teachings which Rabbenu haKadosh taught his son, and the work is accordingly called "Pirkei de-Rabbenu haKadosh" or "Pirkei Rabbenu haKadosh" in the two editions and in the manuscripts on which they are based.

The editions in question comprise two different recensions. In the text of Schönblum the number of numerical groups is 24; and at the beginning stands the strange order 6, 5, 4, 3, followed by the numbers 7–24. On the other hand, in Grünhut's text, which is based on a defective manuscript, the order of the "peraḳim" proceeds naturally from 3 to 12 (or 13), but the rest are lacking; and, quite apart from this divergence in the method of grouping, even within the numerical groups the two editions differ strikingly in the number and occasionally also in the wording of individual passages. In an Oxford codex of the Mahzor Vitry, a passage occurring in both editions is cited as being in Pesikta; and it is also stated that it treats of a series of from 3 to 10 objects.

A similar collection, probably more ancient in origin, was edited by Horowitz in the Kebod Huppah, the work being based on a codex of De Rossi of the year 1290. This compilation is named the "Huppat Eliyahu" or the "Sheva Huppot," on account of its opening words, "Seven canopies will God set up for the righteous in the world to come". This aggadah agrees for the most part with the Ma'aseh Torah and the Pirkei Rabbenu ha-Kadosh, and presents the numerical groupings up to the number 24, arranged without much order; on the whole, it harmonizes more closely with Pirkei. According to Horowitz, the "Huppat Eliyahu" was revised and expanded into the "Huppat Eliyahu Rabbah."

The "Huppat Eliyahu" was edited as far as No. 16 by R. Israel Alnaqua at the end of his Menorat ha-Ma'or; and this portion of the compilation, together with other extracts from this work, was appended by Elijah de Vidas to his Reshit Chochmah. Alnaqua mentions also among the sources which he used "Huppat Eliyahu Zutta ve-Rabbah," which were evidently merely parts of the same work. From them were probably derived the two extracts in paragraphs 201 and 247 of the Menorat ha-Ma'or of Isaac Aboab, which are cited as occurring in the "Huppat Eliyahu Rabbah" and the "Huppat Eliyahu Zutta." Alnaqua was, furthermore, the compiler of many maxims beginning with the words לעולם, גדול and גדולה, and forming the "Or 'Olam" at the end of his "Menorat ha-Ma'or." This collection was likewise incorporated by De Vidas in his work, and has been reprinted by Jellinek as the "Midrash le-'Olam" and "Midrash Gadol u-Gedolah."

The Ma'aseh Torah formed the model for the rich collection of the Vilna Gaon which bears the same name, and which appeared at Warsaw in 1804 with the additions of his son Abraham.
