= Midrash Veyechulu =

Midrash Veyechulu (Hebrew: מדרש ויכלו) is one of the smaller midrashim, named after Genesis 2:1 ("Veyechulu ha-Shamayim"). It contained both halakhic and aggadic material, and doubtless covered several books of the Pentateuch; but it now exists only in citations by various authors after the middle of the 12th century.

In Ha-Rokeach, passages from it are quoted as belonging to Genesis 19:24, to the pericopes Beḥuḳḳotai and Beha'aloteka, and to Deuteronomy 2:31. Judging from the first and fourth of these citations, Midrash Veyechulu was a homiletic work, because Tanhuma on Genesis 19 and on Deuteronomy 2:31, as well as Deuteronomy Rabbah on 2:31, likewise contains homilies. The midrash must have derived much material from the Tanhuma Yelammedenu, because some of the few fragments that have been preserved agree more or less accurately with passages from the Tanhuma or with excerpts in Yalkut Shimoni from Yelammedenu. The midrash seems also to have been called "Veyechulu Rabbah." The citations from it are collected in Grünhut's Sefer ha-Liḳḳuṭim.
