= Midrash Eser Galiyyot =

Midrash Eser Galiyyot (Hebrew: מדרש עשר גליות) is one of the smaller midrashim and treats of the ten exiles which have befallen the Jews, counting four exiles under Sennacherib, four under Nebuchadnezzar, one under Vespasian, and one under Hadrian. It contains also many parallels to the Seder 'Olam, ch. xxii. et seq.

A citation of the commentator R. Hillel on Sifre justifies the inference that the Midrash 'Eser Galiyyot originally stood at the end of Seder 'Olam; and it is also possible that Abraham ibn David likewise drew material from it, for an older edition of his Sefer ha-Kabbalah includes this midrash.

The aggadah at the beginning of the midrash, to the effect that the Jews had suffered ten exiles, was cited, with the formula "Our teachers have taught," by R. Ẓemaḥ Gaon in his letter addressed to the community of Kairwan in the latter part of the 9th century. The midrash has been edited by A. Jellinek and, with valuable notes, by Grünhut. A later recension which "cares little about haggadic chronology, but much about haggadic embellishment," was printed in B. H. v. 113–116.
