= Midrash Tadshe =

Small midrash on Genesis 1:11

Midrash Tadshe (Hebrew: מדרש תדשא) is a small midrash which begins with an interpretation of Gen. 1:11:

"And God said, Let the earth bring forth" ("Tadshe ha-aretz"). R. Pinchas asked, "Why did God decree that grass and herbs and fruits should grow upon the third day, while light was not created until the fourth? To show His infinite power, which is almighty; for even without the light He caused the earth to bring forth [while now He creates all manner of trees and plants through the operation of the light]."

The name of the author occurs twice, and the midrash closes with the words "'ad kan me-divrei R. Pinchas ben Yair." No other authors are named.

Midrash Tadshe must not be confused with another baraita bearing the title Baraita de-Rabbi b. Yair, which deals with gradations of virtues, the highest of which causes its possessor to share in the holy spirit.

== Contents ==
Midrash Tadshe is unusual in several respects, compared to other midrashim. Although written in pure Hebrew, it contains numerous expressions which are not found elsewhere, such as חג העומר and חג השופרות and ככבים שרועים (= "planets," p. 19). The structure of the midrash is very loose.

The midrash is generally symbolic in tendency, and it plays much on groups of numbers. Section 2 contains a symbolization of the Tabernacle, and, according to A. Epstein, the central idea of the midrash is the theory of three worlds — earth, man, and the Tabernacle. Section 10 contains a mystical explanation of the numbers mentioned in connection with the offerings of the princes (Numbers 7:12-89). Combinations and parallelisms based on the number ten are found in sections 5 and 15; on seven, in 6, 11, and 20; on six, in 20; on five, in 7; on four, in 20; on three, in 12, 18, etc. Desultory expositions of Genesis 2:17; 3:3, 14 et seq.; Exodus 7:12 et seq., 83 et seq.; Leviticus 13:2, 14:34; Lamentations 1:1 et seq.; Numbers 4:3, 27:7; and Deut. 32:12, are contained in sections 7, 10, 17, 20, 21, and 22.

=== Analogies with the Book of Jubilees ===
Especially noteworthy is section 8, on "the ages of the pious," the Patriarchs, the Matriarchs, and the twelve sons of Jacob, giving also the dates of their births. In this list the months are not designated as Nisan, etc., but as "the first," "the second," etc. The dates for Zebulun and Benjamin are lacking in the present text, but are given in a citation by Baḥya and in the Yalḳuṭ, where, however, the months are named and not numbered. The length of life ascribed to the sons of Jacob agrees with that given in Seder Olam Zutta, but only the Book of Jubilees gives the days and months of their births, and even it does not state the length of their lives.

On the other hand, section 6 of Midrash Tadshe is in entire agreement with Jubilees (2, 3, 4, 7, 10, 12, 14, 15, and 23) in its statement that 22 varieties of things were created in the world—seven on the first day; one on the second; four on the third; three on the fourth; three on the fifth; and four on the sixth—and that these 22 varieties correspond to the 22 generations from Adam to Jacob (and to the 22 letters of the alphabet).

Epstein has drawn attention to other striking analogies between this midrash and the Book of Jubilees, especially to the theory of R' Pinchas ben Yair (p. 31) that Adam was created in the first week, and that Eve was formed in the second week, from his rib; this serving as the foundation for the rule of purification given in Lev. 12:2 et seq., with which Jubilees 3:8 can be compared. On these grounds, Epstein advances the hypothesis that in this and many other passages the author of the Midrash Tadshe used the Book of Jubilees, which existed at that time in Hebrew and was much larger in scope than at present, and was ascribed, "on account of its Essenic tendency," to R' Pinchas, who was famous for his great piety. However, it is unlikely that the present Book of Jubilees is incomplete, and a much more plausible view of Epstein's is that which regards the Midrash Tadshe as the work of Rabbi Moses ha-Darshan.

Midrash Vayisau is also connected with Moses ha-Darshan, and shows some similarities with Tadshe.

== Later usage ==
Either due to its beginning, or for some other reason, R' Pinchas ben Yair was regarded as the author of this midrash, and Numbers Rabbah 13:10 and 14:12,18 contain excerpts from the midrash in the name of R' Pinchas ben Yair. Yalkut Shimoni excerpted several passages from it, and it has been cited by various authors.

The midrash has been edited according to manuscript sources by Adolf Jellinek and by A. Epstein.
