= Midrash Vayisau =

Midrash Vayisau (Hebrew: מדרש ויסעו) is one of the smaller midrashim. This small midrash, "the heroic legend of the sons of Jacob", is based on Genesis 35:5 and 36:6, and recounts the story of the wars of Jacob and his sons against the kings of the Amorites and against Esau and his Edomite army.

The earliest attestation of Midrash Vayisau appears in Bereshit Rabbati, attributed to R. Moshe ha-Darshan of Narbonne (11th century).

The beginning of its discussion of the Amorite war is as follows: "Our teachers said that although they did not pursue after them this time, yet seven years later all the kings of the Amorites gathered themselves together against the sons of Jacob."

== Sources ==
That the legends contained in Vayisau are very old may be inferred from the Book of Jubilees and from the Testament of Judah; the midrash betrays its relationship to these old pseudepigraphical writings in many details. The war against the Amorites is treated at greater length in the Sefer ha-Yashar, pericope "Beshallach." The midrash itself is contained in Yalkut Shimoni, and is mentioned by Naḥmanides as "Sefer Milchamot Benei Ya'akov".

Strack & Stemberger (1991) cite the opinion of G. Schmitt that the work was composed not later than the Bar Kokhba war. The text has been edited according to the Yalkut Shimoni by A. Jellinek, by S. Chones, and by Charles.

Scholars believe that either the author of Vayisau drew upon Jubilees and the Testament of Judah separately, or that Vayisau preserves the source of these two ancient documents. Martha Himmelfarb favours the latter version.

Nevertheless, the text also shows some evidence of translation from Greek.

== See also ==
- Midrash Tadshe
