= Joseph Kara =

Joseph ben Simeon Kara (c. 1065 – c. 1135) (Hebrew: יוסף בן שמעון קרא), also known as Mahari Kara, was a French Bible exegete who was born and lived in Troyes.

== Biography ==
His uncle and teacher was Menachem ben Helbo, whom Ḳara often cites in his commentaries, these quotations being almost the only source of knowledge concerning Menahem's exegesis.

Ḳara frequented Rashi's house; it is even possible that he was Rashi's pupil, though this is denied by A. Epstein. They each quote from the other. In Rashi's house Ḳara also made the acquaintance of Samuel ben Meïr. They likewise quote each other.

Isaac Ḳara, of whose exegesis specimens are given in Monatsschrift, 1864, p. 219; 1865, p. 384, may be Joseph's son.

The surname "Ḳara" is usually taken to be a professional name, meaning "reader" or "interpreter of the Bible". Adolf Jellinek points out, however, that "Ḳara," as contrasted with "Darshan," means the representative of the "Peshaṭ" ("Pashṭan").

He was among the first French exegetes and the forerunner of the French school of exegetes later to come. They were all to some extent influenced by his works, most notably among them, the Rashbam. Rashi too was influenced by R. Yosef who repeated his teacher's comments to him and incorporated several of them in his commentary.

== Works ==
Ḳara was a prolific exegetical writer. When he copied Rashi's commentary on the Pentateuch he added numerous glosses and remarks in order to supplement and revise it; and these glosses were inserted by the scribes in the text of Rashi. They have been collected.

The original or independent Bible commentaries of Ḳara are:

- Karo apparently wrote a commentary on the Torah which is almost completely lost; what remains has been reconstructed by alhatorah.org.
- Karo wrote a commentary on the Nevi'im Rishonim which survived in a single manuscript (MS Kirchheim) until it was lost during World War II. A partial copy by Simon Eppenstein of MS Kirchheim, expanded by chapters preserved in MS Cincinnati JCF 1, has been published by alhatorah.org. Commentaries on the Prophets were published in Miḳra'ot Gedolot, Lublin, 1897; extracts from these commentaries were published by Wolf; by Littmann (from Isaiah and Ezekiel. Those on Samuel and most of the Minor Prophets are not genuine. The Jeremiah commentary was published separately by Schlossberg; that on Hosea, Breslau, 1861.
- Commentaries on most of the Hagiographa, namely:
  - Proverbs; see the quotation in Ḳara's commentary on Eccl. 7:12.
  - Book of Job, published in Monatsschrift, vols. 5-7
  - Shir HaShirim (1:1-7:13), published by Hübsch
  - Book of Ruth, published by Hübsch, l.c., and by A. Jellinek, l.c.
  - Lamentations, published in Naples in 1486, and by Hübsch (l.c.), Jellinek (l.c.), and E. Ashkenazi, and by S. Buber in two different recensions.
  - Ecclesiastes, published by Hübsch (l.c.) and Einstein
  - Book of Esther, published by Hübsch (l.c.), Jellinek (l.c.), and Berliner

It is quite possible that Ḳara wrote also commentaries on Ezra and Nehemiah, but that the commentaries on these books as contained in MS. Saraval No. 27, and ascribed to Joseph Ḳara, are not genuine. Some comments of Ḳara on Chronicles must have existed, as is proved by the quotations in pseudo-Rashi to those books (see II Chronicles 3:15, 5:9, 25:24). According to Epstein, Ḳara wrote additionally

- glosses to the pseudo-Rashi commentary on Genesis Rabbah, and
- a commentary on the Machzor

=== Characteristics ===
While in his glosses on the Pentateuch and in his commentaries on the Prophets Ḳara depends upon Rashi to the greatest extent, his explanations of the Hagiographa are more original. He quotes Menahem ben Saruḳ, Dunash ibn Labraṭ, Judah and Moses ha-Darshan, Ḳalir, Meïr Sheliaḥ Ẓibbur, Kalonymus, and others. In his commentary on Book of Job he frequently uses the writings of Shabbethai Donnolo, and gives very valuable extracts from the lost Baraita of Samuel with Donnolo's commentary (comp. Epstein, l.c. pp. 34 et seq.).

His grammatical standpoint is that of Rashi. Whole Hebrew sentences are sometimes translated into French. In his expressions he is not as terse as Rashi. He is bold enough to express the opinion that the Book of Samuel was not written by the prophet himself, but later (Commentary on I Samuel ix.9). He does not go into grammatical or philological research, and cares more for the sense of the whole sentence than for a single word. He shows more common sense than depth, and though he does not altogether hold aloof from aggadic interpretations, he takes a leading place among the exegetes of northern France, who in general preferred the rational exegesis.
