= Chronicle of Moses =

Medieval smaller midrash

The Chronicle of Moses (Hebrew: דברי הימים של משה, Dibre ha-Yamim shel Mosheh) is one of the smaller midrashim. Written in Hebrew in a close imitation of Biblical style, it presents a history of the life of Moses embellished with many legends.

The dating of these stories go far back, with composition dates estimated at times such as 900 - 1000, being first published in different areas centuries later. A Slavic translation of this work came about a few centuries afterwards, with different scholars assigning different dates for it, ranging from the middle of the 1200s to the 1500s.

== Contents ==
These legends must be very old, since the same or similar stories are found as early as Josephus. Specifically, the stories of the wise men's prophecy to the king of a birth of a child who some day will destroy the power of the Egyptians (in the midrash the interpretation of a dream replaces the prophecy; compare also Targ. Yer. 1 to Exodus 1:15), upon which prophecy followed the command of the king to cast the male children of the Israelites into the river; the crown which the king places upon Moses' head, and which the latter casts to the earth (in the midrash Moses is described as taking the crown from the king's head); Moses as leader of the Israelites in a war against the Ethiopians, his use of the ibis in combating the snakes that have made his way dangerous, and the love of the king's daughter for him.

According to the midrash, Moses enters the camp of the Ethiopian king קיקנוס, upon whose death he marries the latter's widow, and, overcoming the dangers due to the snakes, captures the long-besieged city.

== Authorship and publication ==
According to A. Jellinek, the life of Moses was originally treated in detail in a chronicle which employed sources still older. This work was incorporated in the well-known collection of legends entitled Sefer ha-Yashar; and from this the Yalkut Shimoni took extracts which agree with the Sefer ha-Yashar and not with the present Chronicle of Moses. At a later time, however, a shorter recension of the older chronicle was made, which is the one now existing.

According to H. Strack and G. Stemberger, the work probably dates to the 10th or 11th century. It was published at Constantinople in 1516, at Venice in 1564, and elsewhere, and was reprinted by Jellinek.

Extracts were made from the chronicle by the author of Midrash Wayosha; and it was one of the sources of Shemot Rabbah; it was likewise cited in the Arukh, by Ibn Ezra (who rejects it as apocryphal in his commentary on Exodus 2:22), and by Samuel ben Meir on Book of Numbers.

== Slavic translation ==
There is an Old Slavonic Life of Moses, which is a translation of the Chronicle. It is known in both East Slavic and Serbian versions, and the earliest manuscripts of the former are from the 15th century. The Serbian version is derived from the East Slavic. Its earliest manuscripts are from the 16th century. The East Slavic manuscripts can be grouped into two recensions.

Émile Turdeanu argued that the translation was made in the circle of the Novgorod Judaizers shortly before 1477, the date of the earliest manuscript of which he knew. The Slavic text does not perfectly correspond to any surviving Hebrew version, but its unique episodes probably derive from a lost Hebrew version. Moshe Taube pushes the date of translation back to the late 14th or early 15th century based on a copy of the Life in the Barsov Paleja. Melissa Lee Farrall argues that the date should be pushed back to the time of Kievan Rus', before the mid-13th century.

== See also ==
- Transfiguration of Jesus, a story from the New Testament in which Jesus meets Moses
- Pseudepigraphy
- Hagiography, a biography of a saint or other spiritual leader
- Philo, who wrote On the Life of Moses
- Finding of Moses, an event from the Torah
- Tharbis, a wife of Moses according to Josephus
- Assumption of Moses, an apocryphal story
- Artapanus of Alexandria, a Jewish historian who wrote about Moses
- Biblical paraphrase
- Revelation of Moses
- Aggadah
- Biblical apocrypha
- Sixth and Seventh Books of Moses
- Horns of Moses, related to iconography of Moses, found especially in Christianity
