= Midrash Jonah =

Midrash Jonah is the aggadic midrash to the Book of Jonah.

== Contents ==
In the editions the work consists of two parts.

The second part, in which the story of Jonah is allegorically referred to the soul, beginning with the words "Vayomer Adonai la-dag," is reprinted in Adolf Jellinek, Bet ha-Midrash. This part is merely a literal translation from the Zohar; it is not found in the version printed by C. M. Horowitz (after a Codex De Rossi).

The first part, the midrash proper, is found also in Yalkut Shimoni to Jonah with the exception of a few missing passages and with several variations; but here the Pirkei de-Rabbi Eliezer (PdRE) is given as the source (for some passages, Yerushalmi and Bavli).

== Date and Authorship ==
Jellinek assumes that the first part of the Midrash Jonah was compiled subsequently to Yalkut Shimoni. But as many passages which Yalkut Shimoni has in common with the Midrash Jonah—e.g., the penitential prayer given in Jellinek, Bet ha-Midrash (i. 99) and the description of Nineveh's grandeur there—are not found in PdRE; and as, furthermore, the author of Yalkut Shimoni probably did not find all this material in PdRE, he must have taken his quotations from a midrash which was substantially identical with the Midrash Jonah (i.e., with the first part). The author of this midrash borrowed nearly the whole of chapter 10 from PdRE, and borrowed also from Yerushalmi and Babli. The version of the Codex De Rossi begins with the passage which in the Midrash Jonah is found in connection with 3:3 et seq.; the extracts borrowed by the latter from Bavli and Yerushalmi and inserted in the course of its commentary to this passage and later are missing in the Codex De Rossi. Then follows the end of part 1 of the midrash, into which chapter 10 of PdRE has been interpolated. (For comparison, in a compilation included in the earlier editions of Tanhuma to the pericope Vayikra, which dates from a later time, chapter 10 of PdRE was also included.) It concludes with the exposition of some verses—Deuteronomy 4:31, Micah 7:8, and others.
