= Midrash Taame Haserot ve-Yeterot =

Midrash Taame Haserot ve-Yeterot (Hebrew: מדרש טעמי חסרות ויתרות) is one of the smaller midrashim.

== Contents ==
It gives aggadic explanations not only of the words which are written defective or plene, as the title of the work implies, but also of a great number of those which are not read as they are written (comp. on the "ketib" in Wertheimer's ed., Nos. 8, 11, 13, 19, 21–30, 37, 51, 69, 89, 106, 111, 113, 124, 125, 127–129, 131, 134, 138–140, 181, and No. 12 on a word which is read without being written).

There are likewise notes on names and words which are read differently in different places (e.g., in Nos. 17, 20, 123, 126, 141, 142, 164, 172), on the hapax legomenon שמיכה in Judges 4:18 (No. 108), on the peculiar writing of certain words (e.g., No. 133 on לםרבה, Isaiah 9:6, and No. 163 on ההלכוא, Joshua 10:24), and on the suspended letters in Judges 18:30, Psalms 80:14, and Job 48:50 (Nos. 112-114).

The midrash may be termed, therefore, a Masoretic one, although it frequently deviates from the Masorah. The aggadic interpretations are mostly derived from scattered passages in the Talmud and midrashim, while the arrangement is capricious, the individual words being arranged neither according to the alphabet nor the sequence of Biblical books. In the different manuscripts and editions of it this midrash varies considerably, not only in the number and arrangement of the passages which it discusses, but also in the wording of individual interpretations. It is cited under its present title in the Tosafot, in the Sefer Mitzvot Gadol by Moses of Coucy, and by Asher ben Jehiel. It is called "Midrash Haserot ve-Yeterot" by Solomon Norzi. A brief extract from this work enumerating the words to be written "defective" or "plene," but omitting the reason therefor, is contained in Mahzor Vitry.

The work has been edited most completely by Wertheimer (Jerusalem, 1899).

== Related works ==
To the Masoretic midrashim belong also the explanations of passages read and not written, or written and not read which have been edited from an old grammatical and Masoretic miscellany in the Manuel du Lecteur of Joseph Derenbourg (Paris, 1871), and in Jacob Saphir's Eben Sappir, and reprinted by A. Jellinek.
