= Hermann Jellinek =

Austrian writer and revolutionary

Hermann Jellinek (22 January 1822 in Drslavice – 23 November 1848 in Vienna) was a writer, journalist, and revolutionary from a prominent Austrian Jewish family. His older brother Adolf Jellinek was one of Austria-Hungary's leading rabbis and writers.

== Life ==
He left home at 13 to study at university and gained a doctorate in philosophy from Leipzig University, where he was later expelled. During his education, he abandoned plans to become a rabbi, and became an atheist and liberal radical. Afterward, he moved to Berlin, but was expelled there too for his political activities, and arrived in Vienna in March 1848. In Vienna, Jellinek supported the liberal and anti-Hapsburg revolutionary movements as a journalist. Following the violent repression of the October 1848 Vienna Uprising, Jellinek ignored the advice of friends to flee. He was soon captured and executed by the Hapsburg military.
