= Midrash Leku Nerannena =

Midrash Leku Nerannena (Hebrew: מדרש לכו נרננה), is one of the smaller midrashim and is cited in the Maḥzor Vitry (§ 426, p. 334). A few fragments of the work are still preserved, from which the midrash appears to have been a homily ("pesiḳta") for the Feast of Ḥanukkah.

== Jewish Encyclopedia bibliography ==
- A. Epstein, Ha-Ḥoḳer, i. 65 et seq.
