= Midrash Petirat Aharon =

Midrash Petirat Aharon (Hebrew: מדרש פטירת אהרן) or Midrash on the Death of Aaron is one of the smaller midrashim. It is based on Numbers 20:1 et seq., and describes the lack of water experienced by the children of Israel after the death of Miriam and the events at the rock from which water was obtained. It likewise covers Numbers 20:24-29, recounting in a touching manner the death of Aaron.

== Themes in the midrash ==
The presiding interest of the midrash is not ultimately the eulogization of Aaron, but is rather the psychological analysis of Moses's inner struggle upon being commanded to inform Aaron of his impending demise. In service of this theme, the midrash touches on various aspects of Moses's tense relationship with God and with the Children of Israel, and interweaves this psychological tension with other aggadic elements to create a more powerful drama.

The picture of Moses presented in the midrash is to some extent that of a martyr figure. Moses is unloved and barely tolerated by his own people (in stark contrast to their adoration of his brother), and is constantly upbraided by God for every remark which casts the people in a negative light. For example, the Israelites attack Moses for having taken them out of Egypt, and threaten his life, but when Moses reports to God this deteriorating situation, the response is: "Moses, how long will you continue to defame my children?"

There is also conveyed in the midrash the sense that with death of Aharon, Moses is losing his only real colleague and confidant, and that neither God nor the Israelites are able to recognize this. Moses is despised both from on high and on low, but selflessly struggles on.

== Outline of the story ==
The midrash begins with the death of Miriam, sister of Moses, upon which occurrence expired the well that the Israelites through Miriam's merit had grown accustomed to rely on for water. Moses and Aaron mourn their sister's death, but the people grow impatient with Moses (significantly, not with Aharon) for his extended crying, and complain to him of the lack of water. Moses pleads for the privacy to mourn his sister in peace, and reminds the people that they have other officials and elders to whom they can appeal, but the people are implacable and threaten to stone Moses immediately if he does not produce water.

Moses speaks with God about the situation, but finds no sympathy. He then leads the Israelites in search of water, but is conflicted about his own capacity to work the miracle of bringing water from a rock. He wonders what humiliation may transpire should he command the rock to bring forth water, and it does not. Thereupon he strikes a rock twice, and it pours fourth not water, but blood. There then ensues a three-way conversation between Moses, God, and the rock, in which again God takes the opportunity to castigate Moses for failure to follow instructions.

Moses is then notified regarding his own death, but begs a deferment to a later time. While God acquiesces to the request, he also informs Moses that he must now approach Aaron concerning his brother's imminent demise. Moses protests that he cannot be the one to inform his older brother that his life has reached its conclusion; that this task is too emotionally difficult for him. While God again displays no sympathy for Moses, he does instruct Moses on how to break the news gently to Aaron, by accompanying Aaron and his son Eleazar to Mount Hor and there transferring Aaron's priestly garments to Eleazar (thus indicating to Aaron the nature of the circumstances). Nevertheless, Moses is greatly distraught at the task which God has given him, and at the prospect of his brother's death, weeping the entire night.

In the morning, Moses relates to Aaron that God has a message for him, while deferring its revelation to a later time. However, this particular day, Moses changes the order in which the priests and dignitaries walk to the Tent of Meeting, placing Aaron in the center position of honor, much to the delight of the people. Still, he does not explain to Aaron the reason for the change, nor can he later explain the matter to Aaron when they and Eleazar walk together to the mountain. Moses tries in a gently elliptical manner to explain to Aaron that the latter's death is at hand, asking hypothetically whether Aaron was loaned something from God which God might now want returned; however, Aaron does not perceive Moses's meaning.

A cave then opens in front of the three, and Moses bids Aaron to enter. Moses wishes now to for Aaron to remove the priestly vestments (as God had suggested), but again is at a loss for words. So, one more in an elliptical manner, Moses requests that Aaron leave the vestments with Eleazar outside the cave because they might otherwise become defiled in the cave (where there may be graves, Moses points out). Aaron thinks it a wise idea, and leaves the vestments with Eleazar outside, but yet remains innocent of the nature of the circumstances. Entering into the cave, Moses and Aaron see a bed, a set table, and candelabra and a ministering angel. Aaron now inquires what message Moses has from God, and indicates that even if it be about his own death, that he will accept it gratefully. Aaron having broached the subject, Moses now takes the opportunity to inform him that it is indeed the notice of Aaron's death which is the message God means for Moses to convey. Not alarmed at the content of the message, Aaron is nevertheless perturbed that Moses did not tell him of his death in a more forthright manner. However, Moses explains how Aaron's death will be more desirable than his own death, for Aaron is to be buried by his brother, and his honor was to be inherited by his children; dignities which will be denied to Moses himself. (Aaron is appeased by this argument, being evidently oblivious to the pathos therein.)

The cave vanishes as Moses leaves it, and Moses then explains to an anxious Eleazar that his father has gone to Paradise. Upon Moses's return from the mountain, the Israelites disbelieve the news of Aaron's death, and accuse Moses of perhaps murdering his own brother! Moses pleads with God to display for the people Aaron's death bed, since otherwise they might make of Aaron a god. God accedes to this request, displaying Aaron on his deathbed, and the Israelites mourn the passing of Aaron and witness the departure of the clouds of the Presence, which accompanied the Israelites in Aaron's merit. With the departure of the clouds, the Israelites who were born in the desert are for the first time able to see the sun and the moon, which they are tempted now to worship. The midrash ends abruptly with an injunction from God to not do so.

== Textual aspects ==
On the beginning of the midrash, which is based on Zechariah 11:8, compare Taanit 9a and Sifre Deuteronomy 305.

The midrash cites no authorities for its statements, but several statements are introduced by the formula ואז"ל (i.e., ואמרו ז"ל, "they of blessed memory said").

== Editions ==
The midrash was edited at Constantinople (1516), Venice (1544), and elsewhere, and has been reprinted by A. Jellinek. A recent English translation is that of Mehlman (1980).

== Bibliography ==
- The JE cites the following sources.
  - Zunz, G. V. p. 146;
  - Jellinek, B. H. i., p. xix.
- Mehlman, Bernard H. (1980), "Midrash Petirat Aharon", Journal of Reform Judaism, 27: 49–58.
