= Numbers Rabbah =

Jewish holy text

Numbers Rabbah (or Bamidbar Rabbah in Hebrew) is a religious text holy to classical Judaism. It is a midrash comprising a collection of ancient rabbinical homiletic interpretations of the Book of Numbers (Bamidbar in Hebrew).

In the first printed edition of the work (Constantinople, 1512), it is called Bamidbar Sinai Rabbah. Nahmanides (1194–c. 1270) and others cite it frequently by the same name. It is the latest component of Midrash Rabbah on the Torah, and as such was unknown to Nathan ben Jehiel (c. 1035–1106), Rashi (1040–1105), and Yalkut Shimoni.

== Relation to Tanchuma ==
Numbers Rabbah consists of two parts, which are of different origin and extent. The first portion, sections 1–14 (on Torah portions Bamidbar and Naso) — almost three-quarters of the whole work — contains a late homiletic commentary upon Numbers 1–7. The second part, sections 15–33, reproduces the Midrash Tanchuma from Numbers 8 almost word for word. Midrash Tanchuma generally covered in each case only a few verses of the text and had regular formulas of conclusion. The second portion of Numbers Rabbah follows closely those readings of the Tanchuma that appear in the oldest edition. M. Beneviste drew attention as early as 1565 to the fact that Tanchuma and Numbers Rabbah are almost identical from the section Behaalotecha onward. Solomon Buber gave a list of the variations between the two. Passages drawn from the Pesikta Rabbati are found exclusively in the first or later part of this Midrash. This is true also, with the exception of the interpretation of the numerical value of the Hebrew word for fringes, of the other passages pointed out by Leopold Zunz as originating with later, and notably French, rabbis. This numerical interpretation of “fringes” forms a part of a passage, also otherwise remarkable, at the end of the section on Korach (18:21), which, taken from Numbers Rabbah, was interpolated in the first printed edition of the Tanchuma as early as 1522, but is absent from all the manuscripts. Another long passage (18:22) which belongs to the beginning of Chukat, as in Tanchuma, is erroneously appended in the editions to the section on Korach.

The legal discussion on Numbers 8:1 at the beginning of the second part is cut down to its concluding passage. A Paris manuscript contains the exordium complete with its customary formula, as usual in Tanchuma, using a formula that reappears throughout this portion of Numbers Rabbah.

== Synagogue recitation ==
The portions of Numbers to which there are Tanchuma homilies in this portion of Numbers Rabbah were intended for public worship according to the divisions of the cycle of the Torah portions and the Pesikta. The variations existing in the division into Torah portions probably explain why some of the old Torah portions appear in Numbers Rabbah without these homilies in some sections, while such homilies or at least fragments of them are appended to other passages. In this portion of Numbers Rabbah, as in its source, the Tanchuma, the collected homilies have been considerably metamorphosed and disjointed. Many are quite fragmentary, and others discursive. Although the marking of the Torah portions at their beginnings and in marginal superscriptions is a departure in the Venice edition, the sections of the second part are indicated according to the usual notation of the Torah portions. With the exception of sections 16 and 17, which belong to Shlach each section contains a Torah portion of the one-year cycle, which was already recognized when Numbers Rabbah was compiled. There are even Tanchuma Midrashim extant with divisions according to the Torah portions, while the Tanchuma, in its earliest editions, is alone in using the original arrangement based on the Torah portion cycle. In Numbers Rabbah, the divisions according to separate homilies are no longer recognizable.

== Authorship ==
Since the second part of Numbers Rabbah, additions excepted, is derived from the Tanchuma Midrashim, the question arises whether it and part 1 (sections 1–14) should be ascribed to one author. It is improbable that the author of the comparatively late commentary on the Torah portions Bamidbar and parashah Naso — supposing that the Midrash on these two is the work of a single author — should have deliberately rounded out this incomplete work with the Midrash Tanchuma. According to Epstein, some unknown author wrote the Midrash upon the Torah portion Bamidbar to complete the Sifre, which commences with Numbers 1:1, another then continued it with the commentary on Naso, and in order to complete the work for the remainder of Numbers, the commentary for the remaining Torah portions was drawn from Tanchuma. It must also be mentioned that a manuscript in the Paris National Library, dating from the year 1291, contains only the Torah portion Bamidbar, while the Munich manuscript dated 1418 covers only this and Naso.

Even the first part contains much that is taken from the Tanchuma, but, as Zunz wrote, "a copious stream of new Haggadah swallows the Midrash drawn from this source and entirely obscures the arrangement of the Yelamdenu." In the Torah portion Bamidbar, the outer framework of the original composition is still recognizable. There are five sections, containing five homilies or fragments, taken from the Tanchuma on Numbers 1:1, 2:1, 3:14, 3:40, and 4:17, which are expanded by some very discursive additions. As Tanchuma only addresses the first verses of each chapter, no doubt the author's intention was to supply homiletic commentary to the others. But in the section on Naso, which is more than three times the volume of that preceding, there are long passages that have no relation to the Tanchuma homilies, based as they are upon the Torah reading cycle, and commencing in Naso with Numbers 5:11. Sections 6, 7, 8, and 10, which, like the other lengthy sections in which the material derived from the Tanchuma are overwhelmed in a flood of new homiletic interpretations, show even more clearly the endeavor to supply homilies and continuous expositions for all sections of Naso. Zunz wrote: "Instead of the brief explanations or allegories of the ancients, instead of their uniform citation of authorities, we have here compilations from halakic and haggadic works, intermingled with artificial and often trivial applications of Scripture, and for many pages continuously we find no citation of any source whatever." The industry and skill of the unknown author of this fragmentary work was nonetheless remarkable. The author, for example in sections 13 and 14 on Numbers 7, gave a different interpretation to each one of the twelve passages enumerating the offerings of princes of the tribes — identical in all but the name of the prince in the Biblical text.

== Approximate date ==
This portion of the Numbers Rabbah shows all the marks of the late haggadic age. There is much which can be referred to Rabbi Moses ha-Darshan (11th century), and which reveals a connection with Midrash Tadshe. The work is, according to Zunz, hardly older than the 12th century. The Encyclopaedia Judaica also dates it to the 12th century.
