= Solomon Aaron Wertheimer =

Hungarian rabbi and bibliophile (1866–1935)

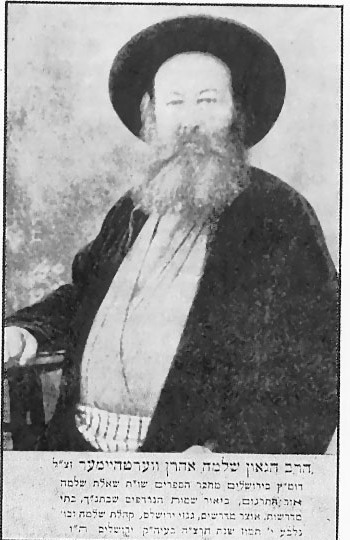
Solomon Aaron Wertheimer.

Rabbi Solomon Aaron Wertheimer (November 18, 1866 – 1935), was a Hungarian rabbi, scholar, and seller of rare books.

== Life ==
He was born in Bösing in 1866. In 1871 he went with his parents to Jerusalem, where he was educated. By 1890, he was residing in Cairo, Egypt, where he made a living as a rare bookseller and a collector and seller of Cairo Genizah documents. According to Arabist S.D. Goitein, he also published papers on them, but "in a somewhat unscientific way." For five years starting in 1893, he tried to sell the British Library Geniza documents for pennies on the dollar, but many were declined.

He is best known for his midrashic scholarship, his work is one of the two standard midrash compilations from the period (the other is Adolph Jellinek's Bet Ha-Midrasch).

He died in Jerusalem in 1935.

== Publications ==
- Ebel Mosheh (1885), sermon delivered on the death of Sir Moses Montefiore
- Ḥiddushe Rabbi Nissim (1888)
- Pirḳe Hekalot and Ẓawwa'at Naftali (1889)
- Darke shel Torah (1891), guide to the theory of the Talmud and to the fundamental principles of the Halakah and Haggadah
- Ḥatam Sofer (1891), Talmudic studies, with notes; Batte Midrashot (4 parts, 1893–97), a collection of short midrashim from manuscripts, with glosses, notes, and introduction
- Ginze Yerushalayim (3 parts, 1896–1902), a collection of scientific, literary, and poetic treatises, from rare manuscripts, with notes and introduction
- Midrash Ḥaserot wi-Yeterot (1898), from the Parma manuscript, collated with three Egyptian manuscripts
- Leshon Ḥasidim (1898), notes and introduction to the Sefer Ḥasidim
- Ḳohelet Shelomoh (1899), a collection of geonic responsa, with notes and introduction, and with Hebrew translations of the Arabic responsa
- 'Abodat Ḥaleb (1902), a commentary on the Jewish prayers; and Leket Midrashim (1903).
- פירוש נביאים וכתובים לרבינו ישעיהו הראשון מטראני, the first printed edition of Isaiah di Trani the Younger's commentary to Hebrew Bible#Nach (1956).

Today, his midrashim are normally printed in a combined two volume set edited by his grandson A. J. Wertheimer. Also entitled Batei Midrashot (Jerusalem: 1967), the work brings together midrashim from Batei Midrashot and Leket Midrash with notes and commentary.
