= Menahem ben Helbo =

Rabbi Menahem ben Helbo Kara (Hebrew: רבי מנחם בן הלבו קרא; 1015–1085) was an 11th-century French tosafist, who is one of the earliest commentators on the Bible in northern France. He is known for his numerous Tosafot, and halakic principles which greatly influenced Rashi.

== Biography ==
Born into a scholarly French Jewish family. His brother was Simeon Kara and his nephew, whom he taught, was Joseph Kara. In his early years, Menahem studied in Provence, which accounts for the presence of Arabic words as well as some Provençal forms of French in Rashi. Menahem wrote comments on the piyyutim which he collected into a work known as "Pitronim" ("solutions"). In this work he covered all of Nevi'im and Ketuvim, but he did not cover the Torah which was a deliberate decision on his part. Almost all of his commentaries are no longer extant as they were apparently superseded by Rashi's commentaries. The majority of Menahem's teachings were preserved by his nephew Joseph, who transmitted them to Rashi.

== Biblical exegesis ==
His approach to Biblical exegesis can be summarized into the following five principles:

- To always aim to explain the plain meaning of the text (pshat), while still drawing from rabbinic midrashim as a basis for interpretation.
- To keep comments short, and concise.
- To recognize the intimate connection between Hebrew and Arabic.
- To use French and German words to provide context for complex Hebrew and Aramaic terms.
- To find links between different passages, and to interpret halakha based on the context of certain words.

These principles were immensely instrumental in shaping Rashi's own approach.
