= Vienna Uprising =

1848 Austrian Revolution uprising

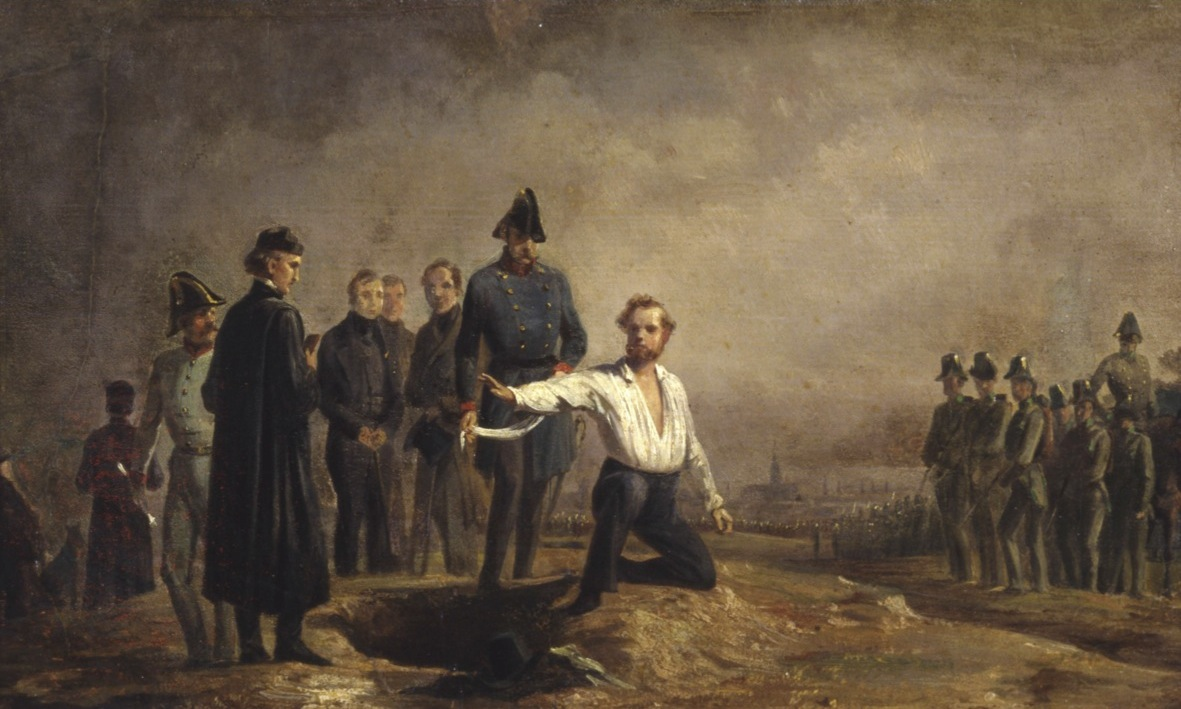
Execution of Robert Blum, painting by Carl Steffeck

The Vienna Uprising or October Revolution (German: Wiener Oktoberaufstand, or Wiener Oktoberrevolution) of October 1848 was the last uprising in the Austrian Revolution of 1848.

On 6 October 1848, as the troops of the Austrian Empire were preparing to leave Vienna to suppress the Hungarian Revolution, a crowd sympathetic to the Hungarian cause (of workers, students and mutinous soldiers) tried to prevent them from leaving. The incident escalated into violent street battles; blood was spilt in Saint Stephen's Cathedral and Count Baillet von Latour, the Austrian Minister of War, was lynched by the crowd. The commander of the Vienna garrison, Count Auersperg, was obliged to evacuate the city, but he entrenched himself in a strong position outside it.

The Austrian Empire became familiar with Emperors and Foreign Ministers coming in and out of administration. The first victim to the Revolutions of 1848 was Klemens von Metternich, who resigned as the Foreign Minister on March 13, 1848. On 7 October, Emperor Ferdinand I fled with his court to Olmütz under the protection of Alfred I, Prince of Windisch-Grätz. Two weeks later, the Austrian Parliament was moved to Kremsier.

On 26 October, under the command of General Windisch-Grätz and Count Josip Jelačić, the Austrian and Croatian armies numbering around 75,000 troops total, started a bombardment of Vienna. On 30 October, Hungarian Revolutionary forces encountered Windisch-Grätz's troops at the Battle of Schwechat, which resulted in a loss for the Hungarian army and resumption of heavy attacks on Viennese Revolutionaries. Imperial forces stormed the city centre on the 31st. The defence was led by the Polish General Józef Bem. Except for him, who managed to escape, all the leaders of the resistance were executed in the days following—including Wenzel Messenhauser, the journalist Alfred Julius Becher, Hermann Jellinek and the Radical member of parliament Robert Blum, despite his insistence of parliamentary immunity. Both sides faced a collective casualty count of about 2,000.

The gains of the March Revolution were largely lost, and Austria began a phase of both reactionary authoritarianism—"neo-absolutism"—but also liberal reform.

== See also ==
- Revolutions of 1848 in the Habsburg areas
- Academic Legion (Vienna)
