= Abraham ibn Akra =

Jewish-Italian scholar

- Born: Abraham ben Solomon Akra; 16th century Italy
- Occupations: Scholar, editor
- Notable work: Me-Harere Nemerim, Arze Lebanon (appendix)

Abraham ibn Akra (also known as Abraham ben Solomon Akra) was a Jewish-Italian scholar and editor of scientific and rabbinic works active in the late 16th century.

== Career ==
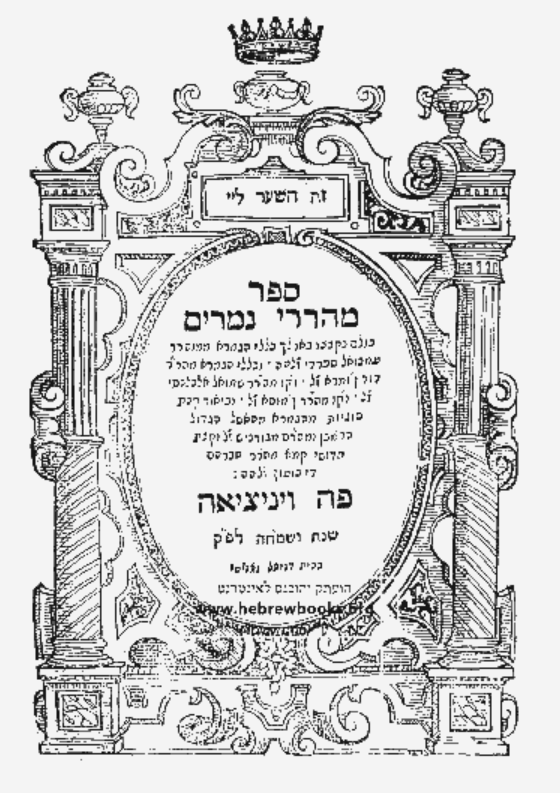
book cover of Me-Harere Nemerim

He is best known for editing Me-Harere Nemerim (Venice, 1599), a collection of methodological essays and commentaries on various Talmudic tractates. This work reflects the scholarly rigor and analytical approach characteristic of Jewish intellectual life in Renaissance Italy.

Akra also authored a methodological treatise on the Midrash Rabbot, which was later incorporated—without attribution—by Isaiah Horowitz (של"ה) into his influential work Shene Luḥot ha-Berit (Amsterdam edition, p. 411). The same treatise was subsequently reproduced in the Vilna edition of the Midrash Rabbot, again without crediting Akra.

The treatise originally appeared as an appendix to Arze Lebanon, a collection of Kabbalistic essays published in Venice in 1601. In this appendix, Akra makes a noteworthy claim: he reports having seen a manuscript of the now-lost Midrash Abkir during a visit to Egypt. This statement is considered the last known historical reference to that minor midrash.
