= Drslavice (Uherské Hradiště District) =

- Municipality
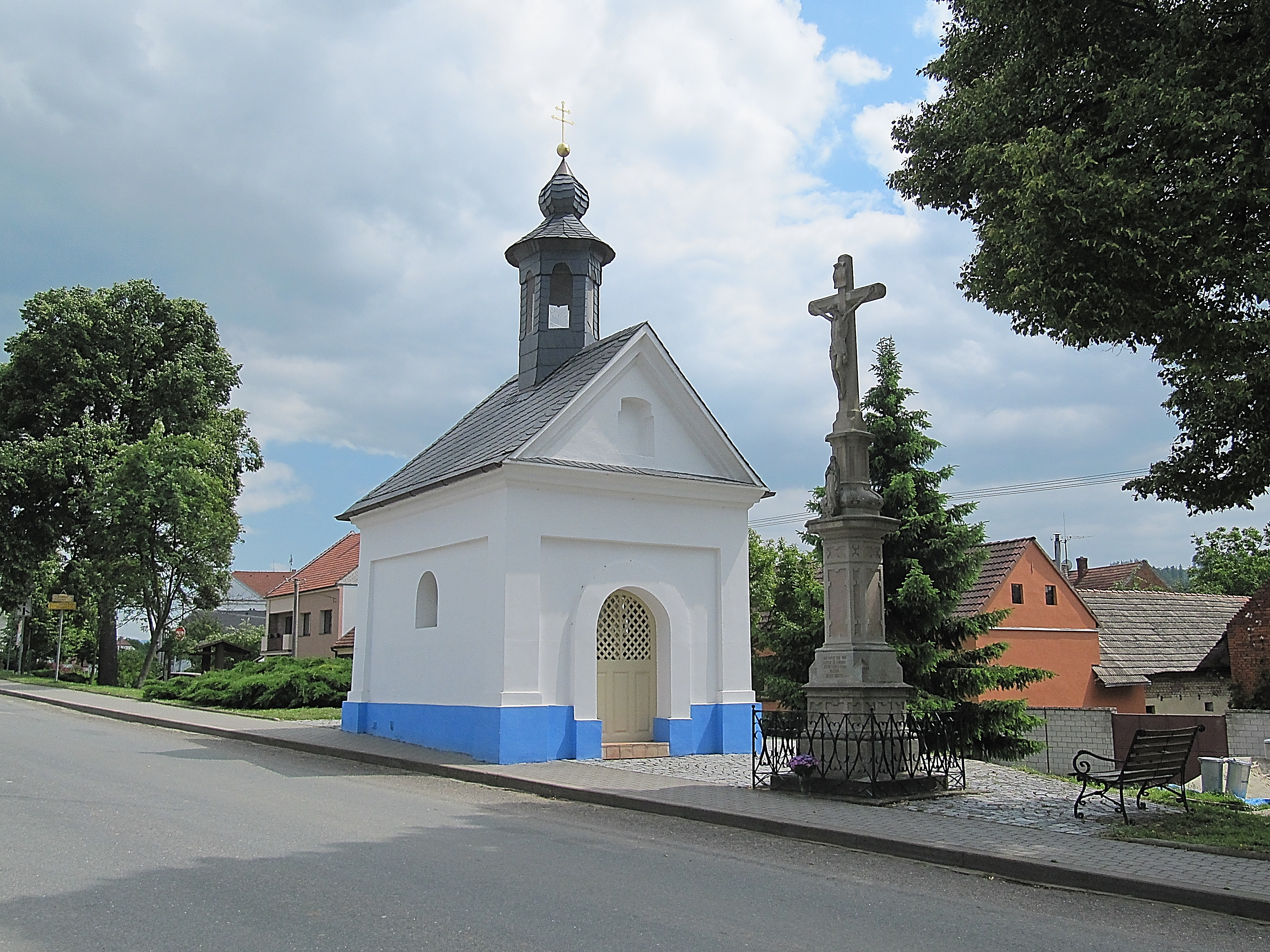
- Chapel of Our Lady of Hostýn

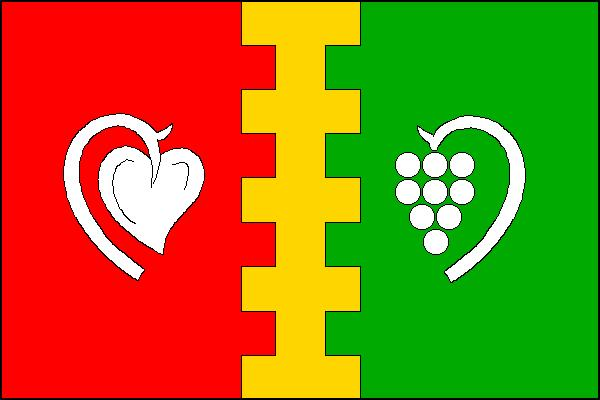
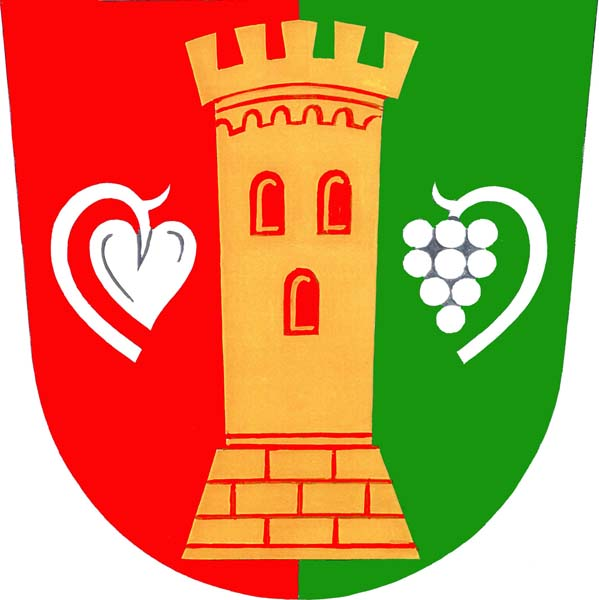
- Flag Coat of arms

- Location in the Czech Republic
- Coordinates: 49°2′49″N 17°36′0″E
- Country: Czech Republic
- Region: Zlín
- District: Uherské Hradiště
- First mentioned: 1373

Area
  - Total: 7.89 km^{2} (3.05 sq mi)
- Elevation: 204 m (669 ft)

Population (2026-01-01)
  - Total: 518
  - Density: 65.7/km^{2} (170/sq mi)
- Time zone: UTC+1 (CET)
  - Summer (DST): UTC+2 (CEST)
- Postal code: 687 33
- Website: www.drslavice.cz

Drslavice (German: Derslawitz) is a municipality and village in Uherské Hradiště District in the Zlín Region of the Czech Republic. It has about 500 inhabitants.

Drslavice lies approximately 11 kilometres (7 mi) east of Uherské Hradiště, 22 km (14 mi) south of Zlín, and 257 km (160 mi) south-east of Prague.

== History ==
The first written mention of Drslavice is from 1373.

== Demographics ==
Historical population
Year	Pop.	±%
1869	462	—
1880	481	+4.1%
1890	492	+2.3%
1900	522	+6.1%
1910	560	+7.3%
1921	625	+11.6%
1930	586	−6.2%
1950	562	−4.1%
1961	593	+5.5%
1970	566	−4.6%
1980	540	−4.6%
1991	475	−12.0%
2001	488	+2.7%
2011	499	+2.3%
2021	481	−3.6%
Source: Censuses

== Notable people ==
- Adolf Jellinek (1821–1893), Austrian rabbi and scholar
- Hermann Jellinek (1822–1848), Austrian writer, journalist and revolutionary
