= Midrash Esfah =

Midrash Esfah (Hebrew: מדרש אספה) is one of the smaller midrashim, which as yet is known only from a few excerpts in Yalkut Shimoni and two citations in Sefer Raziel and Ha-Roḳeaḥ.

It receives its name from Numbers 11:16: "Gather unto me ["Esfah-li"] seventy men of the elders of Israel." In Yalkut Shimoni §736 a citation relating to this verse appears, which cannot be traced to any other midrash and is undoubtedly taken from Midrash Esfah.

To this midrash may possibly be referred a passage in the Halakot Gedolot and a fragment on Numbers 17:14, 20:1-3, which agrees in its concluding words with the excerpt in Yalkut Shimoni Numbers §763 on Numbers 20:3 (found also §262, on Exodus 17:2, which begins with the same words). The name of the midrash shows that it must have begun with Numbers 11:16. The other excerpts in Yalkut Shimoni from Midrash Esfah - §§ 737, 739, 742, 764, 773, and 845 - are based on Numbers 11:24, 12:3-7, 12:12, 21:9, 26:2 (found also at §684, on Numbers 1:2, which begins with the same words), and Deuteronomy 6:16. However, the extent of the midrash cannot be determined.

The interesting extract in Yalkut Shimoni Numbers on Numbers 11:16 names the seventy elders in two of its recensions (a third recension of this passage is furnished by a Vatican Library manuscript); and one of these versions concludes with a noteworthy statement which justifies the inference that the midrash was taught in the academy of Ḥanina Gaon by Rabbi Samuel, brother of Rabbi Phinehas. It would seem, therefore, that the midrash was composed in Babylon in the first half of the 9th century.

According to modern scholar Anat Raizel, the work is a ninth century Italian collection.
