= Midrash Aseret ha-Dibrot =

Midrash Aseret ha-Dibrot (Hebrew: מדרש עשרת הדיברות) or Midrash of the Ten Statements is one of the smaller midrashim which dates (according to A. Jellinek) from about the 10th century, and which is devoted entirely to the Shavuot holiday; a Vatican Library manuscript calls it "an aggadah for Shavuot."

== Goals of the Midrash ==
The author of the Midrash seeks to inculcate the doctrines of the Ten Commandments by citing pertinent tales of a moral and religious nature. In addition to much material from unknown sources, he employs many passages from treatises on the Creation, revelation, and similar topics, which he introduces with the phrase "ameru hakhamim" (the sages say); he seldom cites his authorities. He writes in a lucid Hebrew style. The separate commandments are prefaced by a general introduction based on Psalms 106:2: "Who can utter the mighty acts of the Lord? who can show forth all his praise?" This verse is explained, with reference to Pirkei De-Rabbi Eliezer 3, as follows: "Even the angels are unable to recount His mighty acts; only faintly may be shown what He has created and what shall come to pass, that the name of the King of all kings, the Holy One, blessed be He!, may be praised and honored."

== Sample of Contents ==
After a few sentences follows the aggadah of the strife of the letters, which contended with each other for the honor of forming the beginning of creation. The victor in this contest was the letter "bet," the initial of the word בראשית, while "alef" was comforted by the promise that with it, as the first letter of אנכי, the revelation of the Ten Commandments should begin.

The word אנכי is explained as a noṭariḳon and as Egyptian. This section is followed by a mystic and cosmological discussion of the magnitude of the world, of the waters above and below the firmament, and of the seven heavens. The introduction then makes excursus on the modesty of Moses, which gained for him the honor of God's revelation of the Torah; on the preexistence of the Torah, and on God's invitation to the Gentiles to accept it, which they all refused; and on the pledges which God required of Israel to keep the Torah, these pledges being their children.

In the discussion of the several commandments (דיבור ראשון, etc., to דיבור תשיעי, which are included in the editions of this midrash) only the first and sixth commandments, which have no story attached to them, are treated at any length in aggadic fashion. In the case of the other commandments, legends form the principal part of the discussion, and are arranged as follows:

- commandment 2, the mother and her seven children, the limping Jew;
- commandment 3, one who never swore;
- commandment 4, the pious man and the cow; Joseph, who kept holy the Sabbath-day, the emperor and R. Joshua b. Hananiah, Tinnius Rufus and Rabbi Akiva
- commandment 5, three examples of the love of children, the child and the Book of Genesis
- commandment 7, the temptation of Mattithiah b. Ḥeresh, Rabbi Meir and the wife of his host, Mattaniah's wife and death; the history of Saul, who by the help of Elijah was reunited with his wife after a long separation
- commandment 8, Solomon and the thief, the merchant and the thievish innkeeper;
- commandment 9, the son of the publican Baya.
