= Abba Gorion of Sidon =

Lebanese rabbi

Abba Gorion of Sidon was a tanna (Rabbinic sage) in the second century CE. He handed down sayings from both Abba Saul (Mishnah, Ḳid. iv. 14, Yerushalmi version) and Rabban Gamaliel II. The quote from Gamaliel, was used in the introduction to a Midrash on the Book of Esther, for which reason the latter was called Midrash Abba Gorion.
