= Pinchas ben Yair =

Late 2nd century Jewish tanna

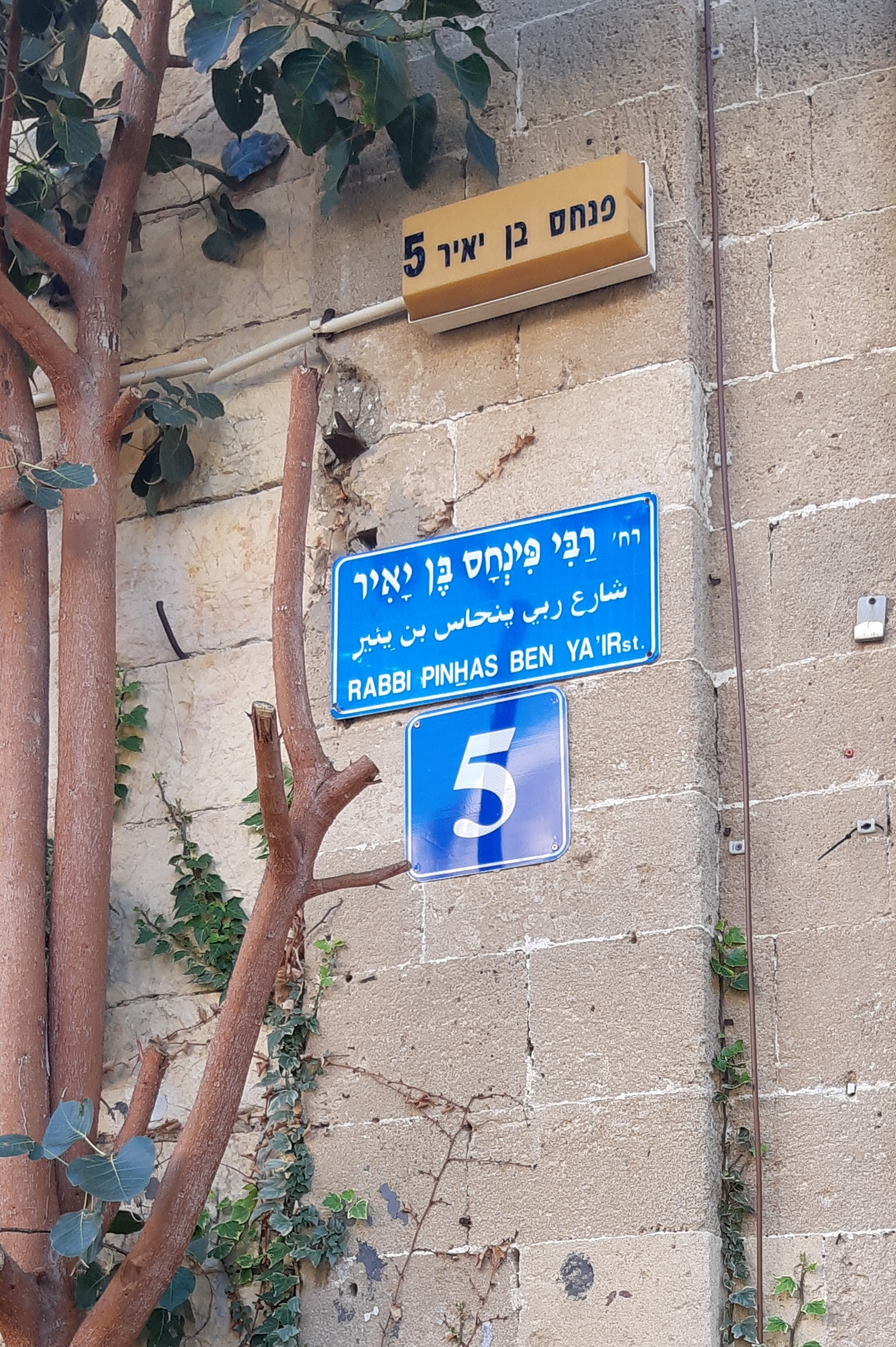

Pinchas ben Yair (Hebrew: פנחס בן יאיר) was a Tanna of the 4th generation who lived, probably at Lod, in the late 2nd century. He was the son-in-law of Shimon bar Yochai and a colleague of Judah haNasi. He was more celebrated for piety than for learning, although his discussions with his father-in-law demonstrate great sagacity and a profound knowledge of tradition.

== Biography ==
=== His piety ===
An aggadah gives the following illustration of Pinchas' scrupulous honesty: Once two men deposited with him two seahs (a quantity) of wheat. After a prolonged absence of the depositors, Pinchas sowed the wheat and preserved the harvest. This he did for seven consecutive years, and when at last the men came to claim their deposit he returned them all the accumulated grain.

Pinchas is said never to have accepted an invitation to a meal and, after reaching the age of majority, to have refused to eat at the table of his father. The reason given by him for this behavior was that there are two kinds of people: (1) those who are willing to be hospitable, but can not afford to be so, and (2) those who have the means but are not willing to extend hospitality to others. Judah haNasi once invited him to a meal, and exceptionally he decided to accept the invitation; but on arriving at Judah's house he noticed in the yard onagers, the use of which was forbidden by local custom on account of the danger in handling them. Thereupon he retraced his steps and did not return.

Pinchas gave special weight to the laws of ma'aser. The aggadah relates a story of a donkey belonging to Pinchas which, having been stolen, was released after a couple of days due to its refusal to eat food from which ma'aser had not been taken. To Pinchas is attributed the abandonment by Judah haNasi of his project to abolish the shmita year of release.

Pinchas was a priest of Aaron's lineage. He, and others with him, used to visit the marketplace of the Saracens in Ashkelon to buy wheat during the shmita year, and return to their own city, and immerse themselves in order to eat their bread (Terumah) in a state of ritual purity. The Beth din of Rabbi Ishmael ben Jose and Ben HaKapar, when they heard that Pinchas (known as a very pious man) had visited Ashkelon when it was not permitted for priests to venture outside the Land of Israel, understood thereby that Ashkelon (though not conquered by those returning from the Babylonian exile) was not like other lands of the gentiles, and that defilement had not been decreed upon that city. Therefore, with Pinchas' example, they assembled themselves and reverted the old practice, decreeing a state of cleanness over the city's air, and that, henceforth, Jews (including priests) were permitted to visit Ashkelon without harboring feelings of guilt or fear of contracting uncleanness.

=== Description of his era ===
Pinchas drew a gloomy picture of his time: "Since the destruction of the Temple, the members and freemen are put to shame, those who conform to the Law are held in contempt, the violent and the informer have the upper hand, and no one cares for the people or asks pity for them. We have no hope but in God." Elsewhere he says: "Why is it that in our time the prayers of the Jews are not heard? Because they do not know the holy name of God". Pinchas, however, believed in man's perfectibility, and enumerates the virtues which render man worthy to receive the Holy Spirit.

=== Miracles attributed to him ===
The aggadah records many miracles performed by Pinchas. Among these is that of having passed on dry ground through the River Ginai, which he had to cross on his way to ransom prisoners. According to another version, Pinchas performed this miracle while he was going to the school to deliver a lecture. His pupils, who had followed him, asked if they might without danger cross the river by the same way, whereupon Pinchas answered: "Only those who have never offended anyone may do so".

=== Tomb ===
Pinchas was buried in Kefar Biram.

== Teachings ==
To Pinchas is attributed the authorship of a later midrash entitled Tadshe or Baraita de-Rabbi Pinehas ben Ya'ir. The only reasons for this ascription are the facts (1) that the midrash begins with Pinchas' explanation of Genesis 1:11, from which the work derives its name, and (2) that its seventh chapter commences with a saying of his on the tree of knowledge.

=== Quotes ===
- Heedfulness leads to cleanliness, and cleanliness leads to purity, and purity leads to abstinence, and abstinence leads to holiness, and holiness leads to humility, and humility leads to the shunning of sin, and the shunning of sin leads to saintliness, and saintliness leads to [the gift of] the Holy Spirit, and the Holy Spirit leads to the resurrection of the dead, and the resurrection of the dead shall come through Elijah of blessed memory.
