= Matteya ben Heresh =

Matteya ben Heresh or Mattithiah (Hebrew: מתיא בן חרש) was a Roman tanna of the 2nd century.

== Biography ==
He was born in Judea, probably a pupil of R. Ishmael, and certainly a contemporary and friend of his pupils R. Josiah and R. Jonathan.

After his ordination Mattithiah went to Rome, apparently on account of the persecution by Hadrian; there he founded a school and a Jewish court which soon became prominent.

He associated with the Judean scholars who visited Rome and sought instruction from them—from R. Simeon bar Yoḥai and R. Eleazar ben Jose, for instance. A later legend in the Midrash Abkir represents him as victoriously resisting a temptation placed in his path by Satan.

== Teachings ==
Halakhic sentences by him have been preserved which show his desire to make the Sabbath laws less rigorous insofar as their fulfillment by the sick was concerned. He seems, however, to have devoted himself chiefly to the Aggadah; a number of his homiletic sentences, especially to the Book of Exodus, are extant. He has a maxim in the Pirkei Avot: "Meet each man with friendly greeting; be the tail among lions rather than the head among foxes".
