= Alphabet of Rabbi Akiva =

Midrash on the names of the letters of the Hebrew alphabet

Alphabet of Rabbi Akiva (Hebrew: אלפא-ביתא דרבי עקיבא, Alpha-Beta de-Rabbi Akiva), otherwise known as Letters of Rabbi Akiva (Hebrew: אותיות דרבי עקיבא, Otiot de-Rabbi Akiva) or simply Alphabet or Letters, is a midrash on the names of the letters of the Hebrew alphabet. Two versions or portions of this midrash are known to exist.

== Version A of Alphabet ==
Version A, which is considered by Adolf Jellinek to be the older form, and by Bloch to be of a much more recent origin, introduces the various anthropomorphized letters of the Hebrew alphabet that God engraved from His crown with a pen of fire contending with each other for the honor of forming the beginning of creation (bereshit). It is based upon Genesis Rabbah 1 and Shir haShirim Rabbah on 5:11, according to which Aleph (א) complained before God that Bet (ב) was preferred to it, but was assured that the Torah of Sinai, the object of creation, would begin with Aleph (אנכי = Anochi = I am); it, however, varies from the Midrash Rabbot. The letters, beginning with the last, Tav, and ending with Bet, all assert their claim to be the first letter in the Torah:

- First, Tav (ת): it is told that it will be the mark on the forehead of the wicked (Ezekiel 9:4, Shabbat 55a).
- Then Shin (ש), as the initial letter of Shem (שם = "the Name") and Shaddai (שדי = "Almighty"), puts in its claim: it is told that it is also the first letter of sheker (שקר = "falsehood").
- Resh (ר) as the initial letter of rosh (ראש, as in "the beginning of thy word is truth," and of Rachum (רחום = "the Merciful One") next makes its demands, but it is told that rosh or Resh also occurs in evil things, and is the initial also of resh'a (רשעה = "wickedness").
- Next comes Koph (ק), as the beginning of Kadosh (קדוש = "holy"), but it is also the first letter of Kelalah (קללה = "curse").

So all the remaining letters complain - each having some claim, each immediately refuted - until Bet (ב), the initial letter of berakhah (ברכה = "blessing" and "praise"), is chosen. Whereupon Aleph (א) is asked by the Most High why it alone showed modesty in not complaining, and it is assured that it is the chief of all letters, denoting the oneness of God, and that it shall have its place at the beginning of the Sinaitic revelation. This competition is followed by an aggadic explanation of the form of the various letters and by interpretations of the different compositions of the alphabet: ATav BSh, AHetSam BTetAyin, and AL BM.

== Version B of Alphabet ==
Version B is a compilation of allegoric and mystic Aggadahs suggested by the names of the various letters, the component consonants being used as acrostics (notarikon).

- Aleph (אלף = אמת למד פיך, "thy mouth learned truth") suggests truth, praise of God, faithfulness (אמונה = emunah), or the creative Word of God (אמרה = imrah) or God Himself as Aleph, Prince and Prime of all existence; at this point, chapters from mystic lore on Metatron-Enoch, etc. are inserted.
- Bet (here named after the Arabic form Ba) suggests house (בית = bayit), blessing (ברכה = berakah), contemplation (בינה = binah), which is prized as superior to the study of the Law.
- Gimel suggests gemilut hasadim (גמילות חסדים = benevolence), especially God's benevolence, and the rain (גשם = geshem) of God's mercy and His majesty (גאווה = gaavah) in the heavens.
- Dalet (here named after the Arabic form Dal) suggests care for the poor (דל = dal).
- He (ה) recalls God's name, as does Vav (ו).
- Zayin represents the key of sustenance (זן = zan) in God's hand, and a chapter follows on Zerubbabel at the unlocking of the graves for the resurrection.
- Here follows a chapter on Hell and Paradise continued in Chet (חית = חטא, "the sin").
- Tet suggests teet (טיט), the clay of earth, and hence, resurrection.
- Yod (יד = "the hand") suggests the reward of the righteous.
- Kaph (כף = "hollow of the hand"—"palm"), the clapping of hands, and the congregation of Israel (knesset) led by Metatron to Eden.
- Lamed recalls lev (לב = "the heart")
- Mem recalls the mysteries of the merkabah (מרכבה = "the heavenly chariot") and God's kingdom (מלכות = malkut)
- Nun, "the light (נר = ner) of God is the soul of man".
- Samekh, "God sustains (סומך = somekh) the falling", or Israel, the Sanctuary or the Torah, inasmuch as the word samekh has several different meanings.
- Ayin (עין = "the eye") suggests the Torah as light for the eye
- Pe recalls peh (פה), the mouth, as man's holy organ of speech and praise
- Tzade suggests Moses as tzaddik (צדיק), the righteous
- Koph also represents Moses as the one who circumvented the stratagems of Pharaoh
- Resh suggests God as the rosh (ראש), the head of all
- Shin recollects the breaking of the teeth (שן = shen) of the wicked.
- Tav recollects the insatiable desire of man (תאווה = taavah) unless he devotes himself to the Torah, the Law.

== Critical assessment of versions ==
Both versions are given as a unit in the Amsterdam edition of 1708, as they probably originally belonged together. Version A shows more unity of plan, and is older. It is directly based upon, if not coeval with, Shabbat 104a, according to which the schoolchildren in the time of Joshua ben Levi (the beginning of the 3rd century) were taught in such mnemonic forms which at the same time suggested moral lessons. Jellinek even thinks that the Midrash was composed with the view of acquainting the children with the alphabet, while the Shavuot festival furnished as themes God, Torah, Israel, and Moses.

On the other hand, version B (which H. Grätz considered as being the original, and the works "Enoch" and "Shiur Komah" as sections of it) shows no inner unity of plan, but is simply a compilation of aggadic passages taken at random from these and other kabbalistic and midrashic works without any other connection than the external order of the letters of the alphabet, but also based on Shabbat 104a. Jellinek has shown the time of its composition to be comparatively modern, as is evidenced by the Arabic form of the letters and other indications of Arabic life. It has, however, become especially valuable as the depository of these very kabbalistic works, which nearly fell into oblivion due to the grossly anthropomorphic views of the Godhead expressed therein, which offended to the more enlightened minds of a later age. For this reason, the Alphabet of Rabbi Akiva was severely attacked and ridiculed by Solomon ben Jeroham, the Karaite, in the early 10th century. Version A was likewise known to Judah Hadassi, the Karaite, in the 13th century.

As to Rabbi Akiva's authorship, this is claimed by the writers of both versions, who begin their compositions with the words, "R. Akiva has said." The justification for this pseudonymous title was found in the fact that, according to the Talmud, Moses was told on Sinai that the ornamental crown of each letter of the Torah would be made the object of halakhic interpretation by Rabbi Akiva, and that according to Genesis Rabbah 1, he and Rabbi Eliezer as youths already knew how to derive higher meaning from the double form of the letters.

In fact, there exists a third version, called Midrash de-Rabbi Akiva al ha-Taggin ve-Tziyunim, a Midrash of Rabbi Akiva treating on the ornamentations of the letters of the alphabet with a view to finding in each of them some symbolic expression of God, Creation, the Torah, Israel, and the Jewish rites and ceremonies. This version is published in Jellinek's Bet ha-Midrasch v. 31–33.

== Versions in the Medieval Kabbalah ==
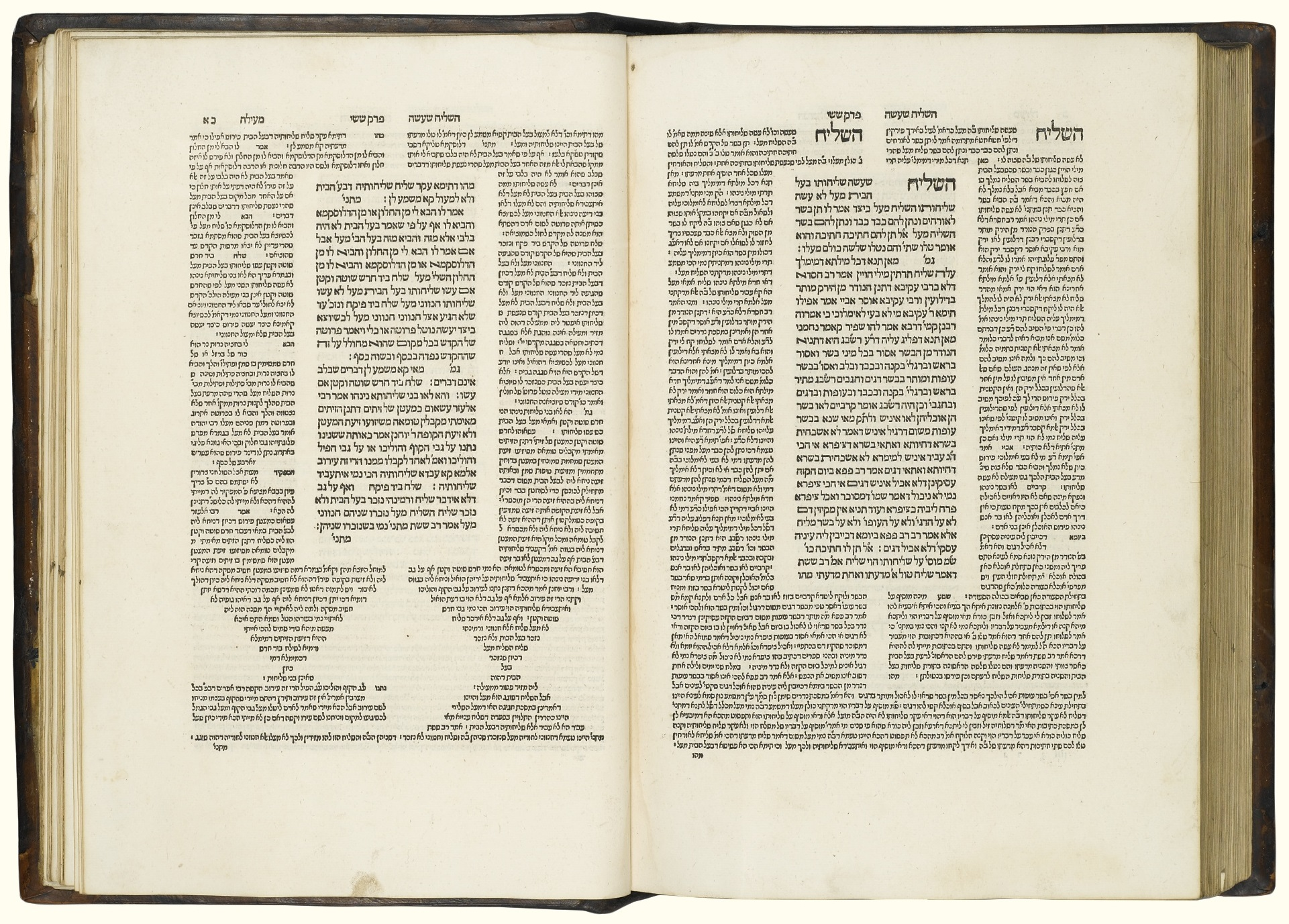
Bomberg edition of the Babylonian Talmud

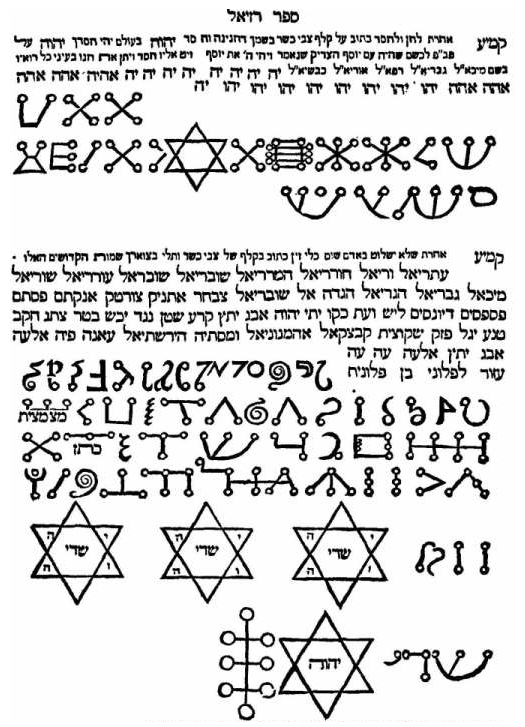
A late printed version of Sefer Raziel Hagadol by Eleazar of Worms

In the tradition of Kabbalah that grows up amongst the Ashkenazi Hasidim, the Alphabet of Akiva plays an important role. The task of recovering—of translating or making his own version—of Akiva's Alphabet was assigned to Eleazar of Worms by his teacher Judah the Pious in a desideratum that indicates an esoteric hallmark of his teaching, gestures toward a form of initiation, and constitutes the theme of Rabbi Eleazar's dissertation from which his variation of the Sefer Raziel will ultimately spring. Until recently Eleazar's Raziel was the earliest extant version of that work—and this amongst other things borders on the Judah the Pious's desideratum regarding his mission to reproduce the Alphabet of Akiva. Concerns related to this assignment run throughout most of the best remembered work of the Master of Worms—he is known for his preoccupation with alphabetic cosmology and practical magic. Furthermore, there is a suggestion that the character of Or Zarua by Isaac of Vienna may reflect a similar assignment or desideratum passed down to another generation by Rabbi Eleazar in a repetition of Rabbi Judah's earlier initiatory challenge. Rabbi Isaac was the student of Eleazar of Worms; his Or Zarua, moreover, being a work that was ultimately completed by his own student and disciple Meir of Rothenburg. In other words: there are hints that engagement with the formal implications of the Alphabet of Akiva constituted a sort of intergenerational rite of passage within this early school of medieval Kabbalah.

The Or Zarua's innovation is to gather all the halachot of every era relating to a specific passage of the Mishnah together onto a single page—creating a sense of extra-temporal simultaneity across all layers of the commentary. According to this diagrammatic sensibility, Or Zarua may be understood as the rudiment of a design primer informing and determining the visual character of the canonical Bomberg printed edition of the Talmud. Here we see the application of mnemonic gloss enter an expanded field. This procedure and its later developments in Talmudic printing anticipate hypertext, as well as various other mereological issues and instruments later manifest in the computer sciences. If it can be assumed that Or Zarua was undertaken as an assignment to Isaac of Vienna passed down by Eleazar of Worms even as it had been passed down to him by his master Judah the Pious, then it becomes possible to appreciate the diagrammatic layout of the Talmud in modern times as a precipitate of this esoteric medieval tradition whose roots are found in the Alphabet of Rabbi Akiva.
