= Abraham ben Elijah of Vilna =

- Born: 1766; Vilna
- Died: December 14, 1808 (aged 41–42)
- Education: Talmudic colleges
- Occupation: Jewish Talmudist

Abraham ben Elijah of Vilna also known as Abraham ben HaGaon; (Lithuanian: Abraomas ben Elijas Zalmanas), was a Litvak Talmudist who lived in Lithuania. There is some debate as to when he was born. Some place his birth as early as 1749, but more recent scholarship suggests he was actually born in 1766. He was born in Vilna and died there on December 14, 1808. He was the son of Elijah, the Vilna Gaon, the most famous Talmudist of modern times. He was educated under the supervision of his father, who was famous both for his opposition to both the Hasidic movement, and the dry scholasticism which dominated the rabbinic leadership of Poland at that time. According to the custom of the time, he married at the age of twelve, but continued his studies in the Talmudic colleges in other cities, and after a few years returned home, where he completed his studies under his father. Like his father, he never officiated as rabbi, but was a highly respected member of the Jewish community of Vilna, in which he held various offices.

== Works ==
It was due to his father's influence that he developed a literary activity of a far more scientific character than was usually found at that age or in that country. Especially interested in the history of the old homiletical literature, he edited the Midrash Agadat Bereshit with a number of other mostly pseudepigraphic works of similar character (Vilna, 1802), adding valuable notes. In the preface of this edition he makes the first known attempt to give a complete history of the midrashic literature. A plagiarist, Jacob ben Naphtali Herz of Brody, reprinted this edition with the preface (Zolkiev, 1804), but was careful to omit the name of Elijah Gaon wherever the son had mentioned him. He omitted, also, on the title-page the mention of Abraham of Vilna's edition, referring only to the one which had been printed in Venice in 1618.

This introduction was only part of his greater work, Rav Po'alim (Of Many Works, published by Simon Chones, Warsaw, 1894). This book is an alphabetical index of all midrashim known to the author. It seems that Abraham of Vilna believed literally in the statement that the eighty concubines of King Solomon (Shir ha-Shirim Rabbah 6:8) meant eighty midrashim. This is at least testified to by Samuel Luria in a letter to Simon Chones (Rab Po'alim, p. 9). The book, however, contains over one hundred and twenty midrashic works. While Abraham of Vilna shows greater interest in literature and literary questions than is found among his contemporaries, he accepts traditional attributions of authorship. He ascribes the Zohar to Shimon bar Yochai, in spite of the many arguments against its authenticity produced by various writers since the time of Abraham Zacuto. He accepts that the book was not written down until generations after Bar Yochai's death. He also believed in the traditional attribution of the Pirke D' Rabi Eliezer.

== Secular knowledge ==
Abraham's interest in secular knowledge, quite rare in his environment, is also manifest in the writing of a Hebrew geography, Gebulot Ereẓ, published anonymously (Berlin, 1801). The book is, in fact, a translation of parts of George-Louis Leclerc de Buffon's Histoire Naturelle. He edited Menahem Mendel's index to the Zohar, Tamim Yaḥdaw, to which he added an introduction and notes (Vilna, 1808). Of his numerous manuscripts which contained glosses to the Talmud, Midrash, Shulkan 'Aruk, and explanatory notes to his father's works, a commentary on the introduction to the Tikkune Zohar (Vilna, 1867), a commentary on Psalms I-C באר אברהם (Warsaw, 1887), Sa'arat Eliyahu, exegetical notes and biographical data about his father (Jerusalem, 1889), and Targum Abraham, notes on Targum Onkelos (Jerusalem, 1896), have been published.

The last-mentioned were edited by his great-grandson Elijah, who calls himself Landau.

== Bibliography ==
- Fuenn, Ḳiryah Neemanah, pp. 207 et seq., Vilna, 1860;
- idem, Keneset Yisrael, p. 21, Warsaw, 1880;
- Simon Chones's introduction to Rab Po'alim, Warsaw, 1894.
- I Idelson-Shein, "Their Eyes Shall Behold Strange Things": Abraham Ben Elijah of Vilna Encounters the Spirit of Mr. Buffon," AJS Review, Vol. 36, Issue 2 (2012), pp. 295-322.
