= Midrash Iyyob =

Aggadic midrash; no longer extant

Midrash Iyyob (Hebrew: מדרש איוב) or Midrash to Job is an aggadic midrash that is no longer extant.

== Contents ==
Explicit reference to the source Midrash Iyyob are found in relation to Job 1:14, to Job 1:6, to Job 1:1 and 4:12, to Job 7:9, to Job 2:1 [?], and to Job 4:10. In addition, the quotes found in the Yalkut Makiri to Psalms 61:7 and 146:4 with the source-reference "Midrash" and referring to Job 3:2 and 38:1 may be taken from Midrash Iyyob, as may be many passages in the Job commentaries of Samuel b. Nissim Masnuth and Isaac b. Solomon. The extracts and quotations from Midrash Iyyob have been collected by Wertheimer.

== Origin ==
Strack & Stemberger (1991) cite an opinion attributing Midrash Iyyov to the amora Hoshaiah Rabbah (3rd century), although this dating is uncertain.
