= Midrash Temurah =

Midrash Temurah (Hebrew: מדרש תמורה) is one of the smaller midrashim, consisting of three chapters.

== Contents ==
It develops the view that God in His wisdom and might has created all things on earth as contrasted pairs which mutually supplement each other. Life is known only as opposed to death, and death as opposed to life (comp. Tao Te Ching, chap. 2); and, in like manner, if all were foolish or wise, or rich or poor, it would not be known that they were foolish or wise, or rich or poor. "Therefore God created man and woman, beauty and deformity, fire and water, iron and wood, light and darkness, heat and cold, food and famine, drink and thirst, walking and lameness, sight and blindness, hearing and deafness, sea and land, speech and dumbness, activity and repose, pain and pleasure, joy and sorrow, health and sickness," and the like.

In chapter 3, the antitheses given in Ecclesiastes 3:1 etc. are enumerated and are paralleled with Psalms 136. Chapter 1 contains an interesting anthropological passage. Chapter 2 begins with pseudepigraphical interpretations ascribed by the midrash to Rabbi Ishmael and Rabbi Akiva; the latter appear, consequently, as joint authors of the midrash.

According to A. Jellinek, the work was composed in the first half of the 13th century, since it drew upon Ibn Ezra and upon Galen's dialogue on the soul, even though it is cited by Me'iri and Abraham Abulafia. It was first edited by Azulai (Leghorn, 1786), being appended to the second part of his Shem ha-Gedolim; and it has been reprinted by Jellinek.
