= Midrash Abba Gorion =

Late midrash on the Book of Esther

Midrash Abba Gorion (AbGur) is a late midrash to the Book of Esther, and may be considered one of the smaller midrashim. The name derives from that of the tanna Abba Gorion of Sidon, who is one of the authorities mentioned in this midrash. Myron Lerner dates it no later than the ninth century; the Akademia is more conservative at "before 1050."
