= Eldad =

Eldad (Hebrew: אֶלְדָּד) may refer to:

- Eldad and Medad, two Biblical figures mentioned in the Book of Numbers
- Kfar Eldad, an Israeli Communal settlement in the Gush Etzion Regional Council
- Maccabi Neve Sha'anan Eldad F.C., an Israeli football club

All later Eldads are directly or indirectly named for the Biblical one

- Eldad Amir (born 1961), Israeli Olympic competitive sailor
- Eldad ha-Dani, ninth-century merchant and traveler
- Eldad Ginossar (born 1981), a professional bridge player
- Eldad Regev (1980, Qiryat Motzkin - 2006), Israeli soldier
- Eldad Ronen (born 1976), Israeli Olympic competitive sailor
- Eldad Tarmu (1960, Los Angeles, California), vibraphonist and composer
- Eldad Tsabary, composer of electroacoustic music
- Aryeh Eldad, member of the Israeli Knesset, son of Israel Eldad
- Israel Eldad, Revisionist Zionist philosopher and a leader of the Lehi underground
- Rafael Eldad (born 1949, Casablanca), Israeli diplomat
