= Moshe ha-Darshan =

11th-century French rabbi

Moshe haDarshan (circa early 11th century) (Hebrew: משה הדרשן, trans. "Moses the preacher") was chief of the yeshiva of Narbonne, and perhaps the founder of Jewish exegetical studies in France. Along with Rashi, his writings are often cited as the first extant writings in Zarphatic, the Judæo-French language.

According to Abraham Zacuto, Moses was descended from a Narbonne family distinguished for its erudition; his great-grandfather, Abun, his grandfather, Moses ben Abun, and his father, Jacob ben Moses ben Abun (called "ha-Navi"), all having been presidents of the Narbonne yeshivah. Moses himself held this position, and after his death it was occupied by his brother Levi.

== As aggadist ==
Though Moshe ha-Darshan was considered a rabbinical authority, he owes his reputation principally to the fact that together with Tobiah ben Eliezer he was the most prominent representative of midrashic-symbolic Bible exegesis (derash) in the 11th century. His work on the Bible, probably sometimes called Yesod, and known only by quotations found mostly in Rashi's Bible commentaries, which quote him 19 times, and twice in his Talmud commentary - Ketubot 75b and Niddah 19a), contained extracts from earlier aggadic works as well as midrashic explanations of his own.

Probably the non-preservation of the work was due to an excess of the foreign element in its composition, causing it to be regarded with disfavor. Moreover, as has recently been ascertained by A. Epstein, it was not a systematically arranged work, but merely a collection of notes made by Moses. For this reason, apparently, it did not have a fixed title, and therefore it is quoted under various names by different authors.

The Midrash Bereshit Rabbah Major or Bereshit Rabbati, known through quotations by Raymund Martin in his Pugio Fidei, has many aggadot and aggadic ideas which recall very strongly Moses ha-Darshan's teachings; it is claimed by Zunz that the midrash was actually the work of Moses. A. Epstein, however, is of the opinion that the final compiler of the midrash, certainly not Moses ha-Darshan, took from the Yesod whatever he considered appropriate for his purpose, especially from Moses' midrashic interpretation of the Genesis creation myth.

In a similar way the Yesod influenced the Midrash Bamidbar Rabbah and the Midrash Tadshe, which later, in a aggadic-symbolic manner, endeavors to show the parallelism between the world, mankind, and the Tabernacle. Concerning the Midrash Tadshe, Epstein goes so far as to assume that Moses ha-Darshan was its author. Moses ha-Darshan explained some obscure expressions in certain piyyuṭim. He is credited also with a midrash on the Ten Commandments and with a "viddui".

== His pupils ==
Moses' son was Judah ha-Darshan ben Moses. Probably the Joseph he-Ḥasid mentioned in Samuel ben Jacob ibn Jama's additions to the Arukh of Nathan ben Jehiel was a son of Judah ha-Darshan. Nathan ben Jehiel was certainly a student of Moses, whose explanations of Talmudical words and passages he cites. Abraham Zacuto ascribes to Moses three more pupils: Moses Anaw, Moses ben Joseph ben Merwan ha-Levi, and Abraham ben Isaac of Narbonne (author of the Sefer ha-Eshkol). A. Epstein credits Moses with another pupil, a certain R. Shemaiah, who is quoted sometimes in Bereshit Rabbah Rabbati and in Numbers Rabbah as explaining sayings of Moses ha-Darshan's. He also suggests the identity of this Shemaiah with Shemaiah of Soissons, author of a midrash on Parashat Terumah, whose cosmological conceptions seem to have been influenced by Moses ha-Darshan.

== See also ==
- Hachmei Provence
