= Temurah (Kabbalah) =

Method in Kabbalah

Temurah (Hebrew: תְּמוּרָה) is one of the three ancient methods used by Kabbalists to rearrange words and sentences in the Bible, in the belief that by this method they can derive the esoteric substratum and deeper spiritual meaning of the words (the others are gematria and notarikon). Temurah may be used to change letters in certain words to create a new meaning for a Biblical statement. The Hebrew alphabet is an abjad or consonantary alphabet. Techniques that, when applied to English, will mostly transform words into a nonsensical series of letters are more feasible in Hebrew.

== Methods ==
There are three simple methods of Temurah:

- Atbash: Replacing the first letter with the last letter of the Hebrew alphabet, the second with the next-to-last, and so on.

א=ת, ב=ש, ג=ר, etc.

- Avgad: Replacing each letter with the subsequent letter.

א→ב, ב→ג, ג→ד

- Albam: Replacing the first letter of the alphabet with the twelfth, the second with the thirteenth, and so on.

א=ל, ב=מ, ג=נ, etc.
