= Abraham Epstein =

Russo-Austrian scholar

Abraham Epstein (Hebrew: אברהם עפשטיין; born 19 December 1841) was a Russo-Austrian rabbinical scholar born in Staro Constantinov, Volhynia.

Epstein diligently studied the works of Isaac Baer Levinsohn, Nachman Krochmal, and S. D. Luzzatto, and when he traveled in western Europe for the first time in 1861, he made the acquaintance of J.L. Rapoport, Z. Frankel, and Michael Sachs. After his father's death in 1874 (see Israel Epstein's biography in Ha-Shaḥar, vi.699-708) Epstein took charge of his extensive business interests, but gradually wound up all his affairs, and from 1884 devoted most of his time to travel and study. He settled in Vienna in 1876 and became an Austrian subject. He was the possessor of a large library which contained many valuable manuscripts.

== Literary works ==
Epstein is the author of the Ḳadmut ha-Tanḥuma, a review of S. Buber's edition of the Midrash Tanḥuma (Presburg, 1886), and of Mi-Ḳadmoniyyot ha-Yehudim, which contains (1) treatises on Jewish chronology and archaeology, and (2) a revised and annotated edition of Midrash Tadshe (Vienna, 1887). He also wrote:

- Bereschit-Rabbati, Dessen Verhältnisse zu Rabba, etc. (Berlin, 1888)
- R. Simeon Kara und der Jalkut Schimeoni (Cracow, 1891)
- Eldad ha-Dani, a critical edition, with variations from divers manuscripts, of the well-known work of Eldad, with an introduction and notes (Vienna, 1891)
- La Lettre d'Eldad sur les Dix Tribus (Paris, 1892; reprinted from R. E. J. xxv)
- R. Moshe ha-Darshan mi-Narbona (Vienna, 1891)
- Dibre Biḳḳoret li-Kebod Rabbi S. L. Rapoport, a defense of J.L. Rapoport against the attacks of I. H. Weiss (Vienna, 1896)
- Jüdische Alterthümer in Worms und Speier (Breslau, 1896; reprinted from Monatsschrift, v.40).

He wrote in addition many critical, biographical, historical, and archeological articles for the Jewish periodical press, especially for Monatsschrift, Revue des Etudes Juives, and Ha-Ḥoḳer, some of which have been reprinted in book form.

== Sources ==
Jewish Encyclopedia bibliography

- Autobiographical sketch in Sokolow's Sefer Zikaron, pp. 162–166, Warsaw, 1890;
- William Zeitlin, Bibliotheca Hebraica Post-Mendelssohniana p. 79;
- Chaim David Lippe, Bibliographisches Lexicon, iii.98-99, Vienna, 1899.
