= Lazar Grünhut =

Rabbi Lazar Grünhut
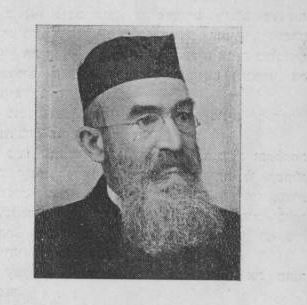
- Title: Rabbi

Personal life
- Born: May 10, 1850 Gerenda, Kingdom of Hungary (present-day Slovakia)
- Died: February 2, 1913 (aged 62) Petah Tikva, Ottoman Palestine
- Notable work(s): Kritische Untersuchung des Midrasch Kohelet Rabbah, Midrash Shir ha-Shirim, Sefer ha-Liḳḳuṭim, Ezra und Nehemia, Kritisch Erläutert, Saadia Gaon und Sein Commentar zum Buche Daniel, Yalkut ha-Machiri zu den Sprüchen Salomos, Die Reisebeschreibungen des R. Benjamin von Tudela
- Education: University of Bern
- Known for: Research and publications in the field of Midrash
- Occupation: Rabbi, Writer

Religious life
- Religion: Judaism

Senior posting
- Post: Rabbi of Temesvár

Grünhut Lazar (May 10, 1850 – February 2, 1913, Hebrew: אלעזר הלוי גרינהוט) was a Hungarian rabbi and writer. He is especially renowned for his research & publications in the field of Midrash.

Lazar was born on May 10, 1850 at Gerenda, in the Košice Region of present-day Slovakia, at the time under the control of the Kingdom of Hungary. Receiving his diploma as rabbi while a mere youth, he went to Berlin, where he attended the lectures of Dr. Israel Hildesheimer at the rabbinical seminary, as well as those at the university. He graduated (Ph.D.) from the University of Bern. For eleven years he officiated as rabbi at Temesvár, Hungary.

In 1892, he moved to Jerusalem on invitation to be director of the Jewish orphanage at Jerusalem. There he was active in teaching and in Zionist political activism. He was active in the Mizrachi movement and was their representative in the Zionist Congress.

He died in Petah Tikva on February 2, 1913.

== Grünhut's works ==
- "Kritische Untersuchung des Midrasch Kohelet Rabbah" (Berlin, 1892);
- "Das Verbot des Genusses von Gesäuertem am Rüsttage des Pessachfestes," in "Zeit. für Evangelische Theologie," 1894–98;
- "Midrash Shir ha-Shirim" (Jerusalem, 1897);
- "Sefer ha-Liḳḳuṭim," i.-vi. (Jerusalem, 1898–1903);
- "Ezra und Nehemia, Kritisch Erläutert," part 1 (ib. 1899);
- "Saadia Gaon und Sein Commentar zum Buche Daniel" (St. Petersburg, 1899);
- "Saadia Gaon und Sein Commentar zu (Daniel,) Ezra und Nehemia" (ib. 1902);
- "Yalkut ha-Machiri zu den SprüchenSalomos" (Jerusalem, 1902);
- "Die Reisebeschreibungen des R. Benjamin von Tudela", published from manuscripts, with translations and introduction (ib. 1903).

== Bibliography ==
=== Jewish Encyclopedia bibliography ===
- Das Rabbiner-Seminar zu Berlin, p. 41, Berlin, 1898.S.

=== other bibliography ===
- Getzel Kressel, Cyclopaedia of modern Hebrew Literature (Leksīqōn has-sifrūt hā'ibrīt be-dōrōt ha-aharōnīm) 1965, (Hebrew).
