= Adolf Jellinek =

Austrian rabbi

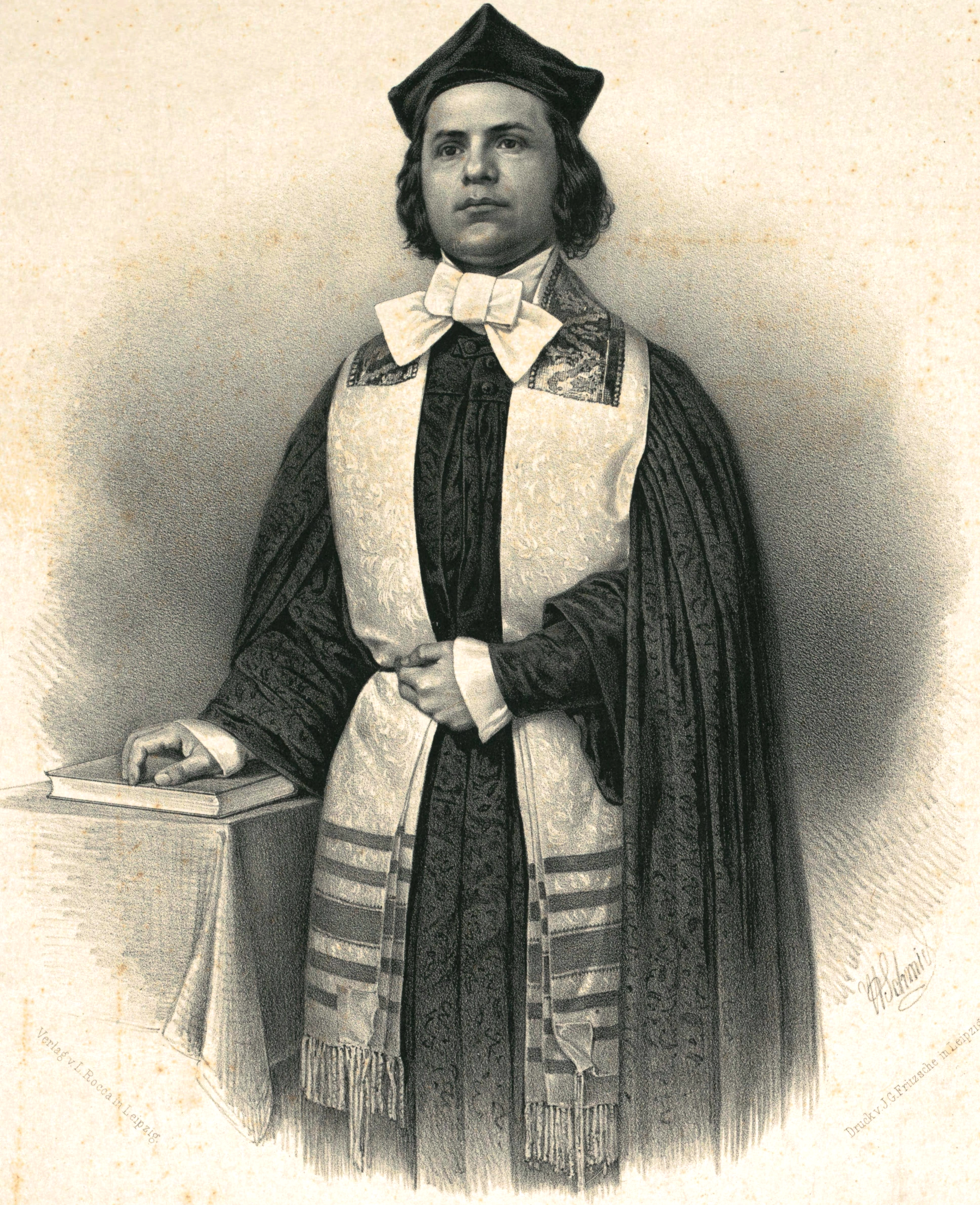
Adolph Jellinek, 1860

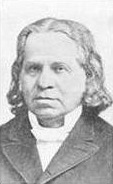
Adolf Jellinek

Adolf Jellinek (Hebrew: אהרן ילינק Aharon Jelinek; 26 June 1821 – 28 December 1893) was an Austrian rabbi and scholar. After filling clerical posts in Leipzig (1845–1856), he became a preacher at the Leopoldstädter Tempel in Vienna in 1856.

== Life and work ==
Jellinek born in Drslavice, Moravia.

He was associated with the promoters of the Wissenschaft des Judentums, and wrote on the history of the Kabbalah in the tradition of Western scholarship. Jellinek is also known for his work in German on Abraham ben Samuel Abulafia, one of the earliest students of Kabbalah who was born in Zaragoza in capital of the Kingdom of Aragon in 1240. Jellinek's bibliographies (each bearing the Hebrew title Qontres) were useful compilations, but his most important work lay in three other directions: midrashic, psychological and homiletic.

In 1857 he was appointed preacher at the new Leopoldstadt synagogue in Vienna, remaining there until he went to the Seitenstettengasse synagogue, also in Vienna, in 1865. In 1862 Jellinek founded the Beit ha-Midrash Academy where public lectures were delivered by himself, Isaac Hirsch Weiss, and Meir Friedmann. A scholarly periodical, also called Beit ha-Midrash, was published under its auspices.

Jellinek published in the six parts of his Beit ha-Midrash (the above mentioned periodical; 1853–1878) a large number of smaller Midrashim, ancient and medieval homilies and folklore records, which have been of much service in the revival of interest in Jewish apocalyptic literature. A translation of these collections of Jellinek into German was undertaken by August Wuensche, under the general title Aus Israels Lehrhallen.

Before the study of ethnic psychology had become a science, Jellinek devoted attention to the subject. There is much keen analysis and original investigation in his two essays Der jüdische Stamm (1869) and Der jüdische Stamm in nicht-jüdischen Sprichwörtern (1881–1882). Jellinek compared the Jewish temperament to that of women in its quickness of perception, versatility and sensibility.

Jellinek was probably the greatest synagogue orator of the 19th century. He published some 200 sermons, in most of which are displayed unobtrusive learning, fresh application of old sayings, and a high conception of Judaism and its claims. According to Abrahams, Jellinek was a powerful apologist and an accomplished homilist, at once profound and ingenious.

== Family ==
His wife was Rosalie Bettelheim (1832 in Budapest – 1892 in Baden bei Wien). Their family included: The eldest son, Georg Jellinek (1851–1911), professor of international law at Heidelberg University. Another son, Max Hermann Jellinek (1868–1938), was made assistant professor of German philology at Vienna University in 1892, became an associate professor in 1900 and was a full professor from 1906 until 1934, and from 1919 also a member of the Austrian Academy of Sciences. A third son, Emil Jellinek (1853–1918), was an automobile entrepreneur, whose daughter Mercedes inspired the brand name of Mercedes and eventually Mercedes-Benz. His daughter Paula Jellinek married a lawyer, Dr. Jur. Heinrich Wechsberg and was the aunt of psychiatrist Erwin Wexberg. A brother of Adolf, Hermann Jellinek (born 1823), was executed at the age of 26 on account of his association with the Hungarian national movement of 1848. One of Hermann Jellinek's best-known works was Uriel Acosta. Another brother, Moritz Jellinek (1823–1883), was an accomplished economist, and contributed to the Academy of Sciences essays on the price of cereals and on the statistical organization of the country. He founded the Budapest tramway company (1864) and was also president of the corn exchange.
