= Lilin =

Night spirits in Jewish mythology

Lilin (Hebrew: לִילֵי ,לִילִין, Syriac: ܠܠܝ̈ܬܐ) (masculine plural of lili, also called lillin, lilim, lilis or male liliths) are plural night spirits in Jewish mythology, male equivalent of Lilith, but are also her children, which she had with Adam or other mortal men.

Their first appearance is in 2 Baruch, as demons similar to shedim, and afterwards in Aramaic incantation bowls, as the male equivalent of the liliths. They don't appear in the Bible, but in rabbinic literature such as the Babylonian Talmud and Midrash.

That Lilith bore from Adam spirits, demons and lilin became a common motif in the mystical literature of the 14th-17th centuries, often adding that it was Adam's own sin which made it possible for Lilith to overcome him against his will.

== Origins and etymology ==
The lilin are believed to be derived from the Akkadian lilû, while the liliths from the lilītu and ardat-lilî wind demons/ghosts. They are also connected with the goddess Lamaštu, although the analysis on the equation between Lamaštu and the lilû class, which resulted in the liliths, is mainly focused on their female counterparts.

Apart from lilu, the lilin are sometimes etymologically connected to laylah, "night". The word is sometimes translated to night demons, demons of darkness, and even female demons (even though it's a masculine term) or screech owls.

== Appearance ==
They have human form with an addition of wings, or are otherwise bald but have hair covering the rest of their faces and bodies.

== History ==
=== 2 (Syriac Apocalypse of) Baruch ===
Lilin first appear in 2 Baruch, 2nd century AD. After fasting for seven days, Baruch sends up a lamentation to Yahweh, and in a passage we find a reference to the lilin:

I will call the Sirens from the sea,
And you Lilin, come you from the desert,
And you Shedim and dragons from the forests:
Awake and gird up your loins unto mourning,
And take up with me the dirges,
And make lamentation with me (10:8).

=== Incantation bowls ===
Hundreds of Aramaic incantation bowls from Sasanian Empire survive, that mention Bagdana "king of the liliths", Lilith, female liliths, and their masculine counterparts, lilis (lylyn) or male liliths. The bowls were found buried upside down, and contain spiral writing that had a functional or symbolic purpose, designed like a maze to trap the demons inside the bowls, imprisoning them within the lines of the incantations that lead them farther away from within.

Liliths and lilin are able to generate demonic offspring, and according to Montgomery's Bowl 1, appear to men in the likeness of women, and to women in the likeness of men, and lie with them by night and by day. The demons are treated with a divorce formula (geṭ), which achieves the recognition of their status and legitimate attachment, while also annulling that status.

Some bowls that feature male lilis/lilin include:

Divorce Text: Joshua bar Peraḥia, 16:1-4 (MS 1929/16)

1 I cast a lot and take (it). And I perform 2 magical acts like Rabbi Joshua bar Peraḥia. And I have written 3 a deed of divorce to all evil liliths, male and female, the ban demon, the companion demon, who appear 4 to Abba...

Divorce Text: Elisur Bagdana, 35:1-3, 9 (MS 2053/89)

1 Bound are the dēvs, sealed are the lilis, bound are the lilis, se[a]led are the dēvs. 2 Bound are the lilis and sealed are [the dē]v[s] and the no-good ones and the lilis, they and their families and [th]eir wives 3 and their sons, from the star and from the lot of Dukhta[y] daughter of Hormizdukh. [...] 9 Elisu(r) Bagdana, the king of demons.

Divorce Text: Other Divorce Texts, 62:1-4 (MS 2053/242)

I beswear you, lilith, male lili and female lili. By the name of pzrhyʾ whʾl. 2 Lilith, the grabber and the snatcher: the three of you, and the four of you, and the five of you. You are stripped naked 3 and are not clothed, your hair is dishevelled and cast behind your back. It was heard concerning you: your father’s name is Palḥas and your mother is the lilith Palḥadad.

The Seals of Ashmedai 81:1-4 (MS 1927/36)

1 Bound are] 2 the demons and sealed are the lilis. Bound are the demons by the great seal of Ashmedai, the king of demo[ns, and by] another 3 [s]eal of Ashmedai, the king of dēvs. I adjure you by Palḥadad, the demon who is yo[u]r father, by Palḥas, the lilith, 4 your mother.

=== Talmud ===
The Babylonian Talmud makes two mentions of the lilin (and five of Lilith), who get often translated as female demons.

Adam, after he received Eve as his wife and was persuaded to eat from the Tree of Knowledge, was expelled from the Garden of Eden with the curse of mortality. When Adam realised that because of his sin, God decreed humankind mortal, he distanced himself for 130 years. He fasted, refrained from intercourse, and wore fig twigs over his naked body. He could not control his involuntary night emissions, which attracted female spirits, who coupled with him and bore spirits (ruhin), demons (shedim) and lilin (Eruvin 18b).

Some builders of the Tower of Babel, after their desire to ascend to the top of the tower and wage war, became apes, spirits, demons and lilin (Sanhedrin 109a).

=== Targum ===
Lilin are mentioned in different books of the Targum:

==== Targum Pseudo-Jonathan ====
(date uncertain, possibly 5th AD)

Targum Pseudo-Jonathan on Numbers 6:24

May the Lord bless you and guard you in all your endeavor from (the demons of the) darkness (lilin) and from frightening demons and midday demons and morning demons and destroyers and night demons.

Targum Pseudo-Jonathan on Deuteronomy 32:

From the midst of the Babylonian captivity I shall exile them to Media and to Elam. Those of the house of Agag shall oppress them, who are comparable to demons swollen with hunger and like destroyer demons consumed by birds and like midday demons afflicted by evil spirits and demons of the night (lilin) inflated with evil spirit. I shall send against them the Greeks who bite with their teeth like wild animals, and I shall exile them by means of the Edomites who are filled with poison like venomous serpents, reptiles of the dust..

==== Aramaic Targum ====
Targum Sheni (date uncertain, possibly 6th AD) on Esther 1:3:

King Solomon, it may be remarked here, "had dominion over the demons, spirits, and Lilin, and knew the language of each ... and when his heart was merry with wine, he would command the wild animals, the fowl of heaven, and the creeping things of the earth, as well as the demons, spirits, and Lilin, to dance before him".

=== Midrash ===
==== Midrash ABKIR ====
The Midrash ABKIR (10th century) is a lost work, the remnants of which present the relationship between Adam, a lilith, and the creation of djinn and lilin.

When Adam saw that death had come upon him by the hand of Cain, he separated from Eve. A lilith named Piznai found him and aroused him with her beauty, resulting in the birth of 92 thousands djinns and lilin. Their first born child was named Agrimas, who took lilith Amarit as his bride, which also resulted in the birth of 92 thousand djinns and lilin. The first born of Agrimas was Avalmas, who took the lilith Gofrit, which again resulted in the birth of 88 thousand djinns and lilin.

The story ends with the slaying of the spirits by Methuselah, using a sword which had the explicit name of God written on it. Agrimas was forced to write and give the names of the djinn and lilin, and the demons gave the humans iron to restrain the spirits. The remaining spirits concealed themselves in the remotest mountains and in the depths of the ocean.

=== Kabbalah ===
==== Emeq haMelekh ====
Emeq haMelekh (Valley of the King) is a Kabbalistic text, written by Naftali Hertz ben Yaakov Elchanan (Bacharach) in 1648.

In the text, Lilin are described as bald, but have hair on the rest of their heads and body down to their feet (140b). According to the cosmology of the text, in the second of the seven earth-layers, counting from the bottom, dwell:

the giant human figures, tall of stature, who were born of Adam in the 130 years during which he begot demons, spirits, and Lilin. Lilith used to come to him against his will and conceive from Adam [and she bore these beings]. And they are always sad and full of sorrow and sighs, and there is no joy at all among them. And these hosts can multiply [and ascend] from that earth to this world upon which we stand, and [here] they become harmful spirits, and [then] they return there... (179d–180a)

A separate passage repeats that spirits, demons and lilin came from Adam and Lilith, when she came to him against his will (23c-d). Lilith is present even when a man wishes to engage in lawful intercourse with his wife, in order to take hold of the semen that's lost from the man, with which she creates demons, spirits and lilin (19c). She is described as an "Alien Woman" and "Impure Female", who leaves her consort Samael to fornicate with men who "sleep below in the impurity of spontaneous emission" and from them are born the demons, spirits, and lilin, who are called the Sons of Man (84b, 84c, 102d-103a).

==== Yalqut Reubeni ====
Yalqut Reubeni is a two-part anthology (1660 and 1681) of the aggadic output of the kabbalists. The text expands on Lilith's connection to the prince that serves her, called Sariel. From his emanation, come spirits, demons and lilin in the likeness of humans. The text repeats the Talmudic reference of Adam's separation from Eve and the creation of spirits, demons and lilin.

=== Amulets and Prayers ===
==== Amulets ====
A Moroccan amulet invokes God, Michael and Gabriel to protect the wearer against "lessening of the moon" (wish for Redemption), and has inscribed:

1. In the Name of Kuzu 2. Fourteen-letter Name, Yah 3. You will protect the bearer of this amulet 4. from Shiddin, from spirits, from Lillin 5. and from every evil thing Evermore, Selah, forever, Amen.

A Jewish amulet, kept in the United States National Museum, invokes JHVH to protect from shedim, lilin, liliths, and other demons like Na'amah, Mahalath and Agrat.

==== Prayer ====
Rites and prayers were created to avert the malign influence of demons, and formulas for the dying were prescribed by Kabbalists, by which the shedim (demons), ruhin (evil spirits), lilin and mazzikim (harmers) are adjured, not to follow the dead or injure them, or cause injury to any person.

==== Manuscript ====
Lilin are named in a manuscript (MS 180/017, f. 170b.), of the Israel Museum, that includes a rare invocation to bind Lilith and other figures like Agrat bat Mahalath and the Queen of Sheba.

I adjure you, Igrat (איגרת) the daughter of Maḥalat, or the Queen of Sheba (Malkath Sheva), or Lilith, in the name of God, the Lord of Hosts (Tseva’ot), who sits upon the cherubs ruling over supernal and lower beings, who dwells in the heavens above and in the waters that are below the earth, and [commanding] over all evil spirits (shedin), souls, and demons (lilin), and over all the angels of destruction, who fulfill His will throughout all the [created] worlds, crushing [creatures] under His feet.

== See also ==
- Lilith
- Lilu
- Agrat bat Mahlat
- Ardat-lilî
- Eisheth
- Lamashtu
- Mahalath (demon)
- Naamah (demon)
- Nocnitsa
- Incubus
- Succubus
