= Agrat bat Mahlat =

Demon in Jewish mythology

Agrat bat Mahlat (אגרת בת מחלת, also spelled Agrath, Igrat(h), Aggereth, Iggereth, Igereth) is a demon in Jewish mythology, one of the four wives of Samael, the others being Lilith, Naamah and Mahlat. Eisheth Zenunim (woman of whoredom/harlotry), an epithet of Lilith, is contemporarily personified as a separate demonic entity.

== Etymology ==
Mahlat and Agrat are proper names, "bat" meaning "daughter of" (in Hebrew). Therefore, Agrat bat Mahlat means "Agrat, daughter of Mahlat."

== History ==
=== Aramaic Incantation Bowls ===
Agrat bat Mahlat appears in three Aramaic incantation bowls, sometimes besides lilis and liliths.

The bowls in which Agrat appears in are: JBA 102 (MS 1929/11), JBA 103 (MS 2053/196) and JBA 104 (MS 2053/238).

A historiola inscribed on separate bowls (titled "RABBI ḤANINA BEN DOSA"), which deals with Ḥanina ben Dosa who encounters a female demon, shares some common motifs with the Talmudic encounter of the sage with Agrat. Despite the similarities, it cannot be based on the Talmudic story, and instead these two sources present separate versions of a story of an encounter between Ḥanina ben Dosa and an evil spirit.

=== Talmud ===
Agrat might be "the mistress of the sorceresses" who communicated magic secrets to Amemar, a Jewish sage.

In a Talmudic story, Agrat meets Ḥanina ben Dosa and Abaye (Talmud: Pesachim 112b:15-17), who ended up curbing her malevolent powers over humans.

With regard to the instruction: Do not go out alone at night, the Gemara states that this is as it was taught in a baraita: One should not go out alone at night, neither on Tuesday nights nor on Shabbat nights, i.e., Friday nights, because the demon Agrat, daughter of Maḥalat, she and 180,000 angels of destruction go out at these times. And as each and every one of them has permission to destroy by itself, they are all the more dangerous when they go forth together.

The Gemara states: Initially, these demons were present every day. Once Agrat, daughter of Maḥalat, met Rabbi Ḥanina ben Dosa and said to him: Had they not announced about you in the Heavens: Be careful of Ḥanina and his Torah, I would have placed you in danger. He said to her: If I am considered important in Heaven, I decree upon you that you should never travel through inhabited places. She said to him: I beg you, leave me a little space. He left for her Shabbat nights and Tuesday nights.

And furthermore, once Agrat, daughter of Maḥalat met Abaye and said to him: Had they not announced about you in the Heavens: Be careful of Naḥmani, Abaye, and his Torah, I would have placed you in danger. He said to her: If I am considered important in Heaven, I decree upon you that you should never pass through inhabited places. The Gemara asks: But we see that, notwithstanding these anecdotes, demons do pass through inhabited areas.

=== Midrash ===
Agrat is mentioned once in the Midrash, Bamidbar Rabbah 12:3:

Rabbi Shimon ben Yoḥai said: The Holy One blessed be He gave a weapon to Israel with the ineffable Name written upon it. “You will not fear the terror of night” (Psalms 91:5) – from Agrat bat Maḥalat and her chariot nor from all the demons that rule the night.

=== Kabbalah ===
In late Kabbalistic sources (e.g. Tuv haAretz, Bahya ben Asher on Genesis), she is one of the four mates of Samael along with Lilith, Naamah and Mahlat.

==== Zohar ====
In Bereshit 94:355, Agrat is named alongside Lilith and Na'amah.

R. Abba said: [Since we know that the demons] die like humans, how can she [Na'amah] still be alive? He answered: Right, but Lilith and Naamah, and Agrath, the daughter of Mahalath who came from their side, all continue to live until the Holy One, blessed be He, eradicates the spirit of uncleanness from the world.

In Bechukotai 7:26, Rabbi Yose identifies the evil beast mentioned in Leviticus as Agrat

Come and see: When Israel is found innocent before the blessed Holy One, what is written? I will grant peace in the land. This applies above, for the blessed Holy One comes to join Assembly of Israel. Then, you will lie down with none to make you afraid. Why? Because I will eliminate an evil beast from the land [114a] —an evil species of beast below. Who is that? Agrat daughter of Maḥalat, along with all her retinue. This pertains to night. By day, people deriving from her side, as is written: and no sword will traverse your land. Rabbi Abba said, “It has already been established that this applies even to a sword of peace, like that of Pharaoh Necho. However, no sword will traverse your land—her retinue. I will eliminate an evil beast from the land—that she will have no dominion over the land, not even merely passing through; and even an armed man of the other nations will not pass by you.

According to Rabbi Abba, the sword refers to Agrat's destructive retinue, while the evil beast refers to Agrat herself.

In Zohar Chadash Noah 56, it's briefly mentioned that the chief minion of Agrat is Joseph the demon. Joseph also appears in the Talmud, where it's not clear whether he's a person expert in demonology, or a demon who taught the sages about demons, while in the Zohar he is clearly a demonic entity.

==== Sefer ‘Etz Ḥayyim ====
According to Ḥayyim Vital, a disciple of Isaac Luria, the demon queen Lilith rules over Rome, Agrat over Salamanca, Rahab over Egypt and Na'amah over Damascus.

==== Emeq haMelekh ====
In Emeq haMelekh (Valley of the King, 1648), a demon named Asimon rides on Naamah, and Naamah rides on Agrat, the daughter of Mahalath, who herself rides on several kinds of spirits and mid-day demons.

==== Tuv haAretz ====
Nathan Spira (1655) recounts that Samael, who was given four kingdoms, has a concubine in each one of them. Their names are Lilith, Naamah, Even Maskith and Agrat, and they rule the Kingdom of Damascus, the Kingdom of Tyre (which is opposite of Israel), Kingdom of Malta (which was called Rhodus), and the Kingdom called Granata, who some say is the Kingdom of Ishmael.

=== Commentary ===
==== Rabbeinu Bahya ====
Rabbi Bahya commented on Genesis 4:22, where he lists Agrat as one of the four mothers of demons.

Four women were the mothers of demons: Lilith, Naamah, Igrath, and Mahalath. Each one of them has her own hosts and classes of spirits of uncleanness, and they have no number. And it is said that each of them rules on one of the four Tequfot [i.e., the vernal equinox, the summer solstice, the autumnal equinox, and the winter solstice] of the years, when they gather on a lofty peak near the Mountains of Darkness. Each of them rules on her Tequfa, from the hour of sunset until midnight, they and all their hosts. But King Solomon ruled over all of them and called them [his] slaves and slave-women and used them according to his will. And these four women are the wives of Esau’s heavenly patron [i.e., Samael], and following his example, Esau himself took four wives, as explained in the Pentateuch (4:22:2).

=== Manuscripts ===
Agrat is mentioned in a 15th century manuscript, that's asking her help to obtain a succuba.

In the 18th century, she's mentioned in a manuscript (MS Bill Gross, EE.011.039, f. 88a.) where the writer asks for power to be denied to forces of Liliths and Mahalath, and the angels Senoy, Sansenoy and Semangelof to be sent against Liliths and Agrat. A different manuscript features an invocation to bind Lilith, Agrat, Mahalath and the Queen of Sheba (Israel Museum MS 180/017, f. 170b.)

=== In other sources ===
==== School of the RaShBA ====
According to legend, Agrat and Lilith visited King Solomon disguised as prostitutes. One night King David slept in the camp in the desert, and Agrat coupled with him in his dream. She conceived and bore him a demonic son, Asmodeus, who is identified with Hadad the Edomite. The queens of demons, Agrat, Naamah and Mahalath, and their cohorts, give birth to children, except for Lilith alone, who is just fornication.

==== Sefer Meir T'hillot ====
In Sefer Meir T'hillot/Meïr Tehillot (The Illuminator of the Psalms, 1512), it is explained that Mahalath was daughter to Ishmael and his wife, who was herself daughter of Egyptian sorcerer Kasdiel. Mother and daughter were exiled to the desert, where the demon Igrathiel mated with Mahalat and engendered Agrat or Igrat. Mahalat later became Esau's wife, while Agrat stayed to rule the Tequfot (the two solstices and two equinoxes), along with Lilith, Na'amah and Nega, and is sent out to do harm on the nights that precede the Sabbath and Wednesdays.

==== Yalquṭ Ḥadash ====
In the rabbinic literature of Yalquṭ Ḥadash by Israel ben Benjamin of Belzec (1648), Agrat is referred to as the "dancing roof-demon" and is dangerous on Tuesday and Friday nights.

== See also ==
- Lilith
- Lilin
- Mahalath (demon)
- Naamah
- Eisheth Zenunim
- Asmodeus
- Samael
- Zohar
