= Eisheth Zenunim =

Epithet of Lilith, Princess of Qliphoth

Eisheth Zenunim (Hebrew: אֵשֶׁת זְנוּנִים, lit. 'Woman of Whoredom/Harlotry', also spelled Isheth, esheth, ēšet zĕnûnîm) is an epithet of Lilith in the Zohar and later Kabbalistic literature. When Lilith is dual, the phrase is used to describe only Lilith the Elder, who is also the bride of Samael. In Western Esotericism, Eisheth Zenunim became a princess of the Qliphoth, and a demonic entity separate from Lilith.

The phrase Woman of Whoredom derives from Hosea 1:2. In the Zohar, it's used in opposition to Woman of Valor, who is Shekhinah.

== Kabbalah ==
In the Zohar, Lilith, the Woman of Whoredom/Harlotry, is stated to be the wife of Samael, who is a destructive and seductive force. In later sources (e.g. Tuv haAretz, Bahya ben Asher on Genesis), she shares that title with three other demons, usually Na'amah, Agrat bat Mahlat, and Mahlat.

=== Zohar ===
==== Haqdamat (Introduction) ====
Lilith as the woman of whoredom/eisheth zenunim is encountered in the Introduction, as a feminine personification of sin, who is empowered to fly and kill human beings.

==== Shemot ====
The woman of whoredom is associated with the condemnation of humanity. She rules the demonic realm of the Sitra Ahra/Other Side, where there is a place called Guilt, and all the actions of that place are intended to dig up a person's guilt, condemn humanity and prejudice the servant in the eyes of his master.

It is further mentioned that Samael causes Rome to prosper, similarly with the other kingdoms, with the help of Lilith, the woman of whoredom, who in the text is also called evil woman and serpent. He prolongs peace and tranquility for Edom (symbol of Rome) by uniting with her.

==== Terumah ====
The woman of whoredom (Lilith) follows the woman of valor (Shekhinah) everywhere, and unsuccessfully tries to imitate her.

==== Pinchas ====
Rabbi Shimon, while quoting verses from Leviticus on the sacrifices burnt on the altar, identifies the liver and its lobe as Samael and Lilith.

It is written: יותרת מן הכבד (yoteret min ha-kaved), lobe from the liver (Leviticus 9:10), and it is written ואת היותרת על הכבד (ve-et ha-yoteret al ha-kaved), and the lobe over the liver (ibid. 3:4). Yoteret min ha-kaved, Lobe from the liver—woman of whoredom (Hosea 1:2), who comes forth from the liver to lure inhabitants of the world and denounce them, leaving the male to perform whoredom (231b).

=== Zoharic Compositions ===
==== Zohar al Shir HaShirim ====
Lilith, the woman of whoredom, goes to the Garden of Eden every 2nd and 4th day. She seduces Eve first, and then Adam.

“In some instances, holy spirits don garments—models of the bodies of this world—and the body ultimately abandons holy spirit, straying after an evil spirit. Then, holy spirit flies away from the midst of that garment, and that garment is drawn outside the Garden of Eden. For on every second day and fourth day an evil spirit—woman of whoredom (Hosea 1:2)—goes about the Garden of Eden. Some garments are lured by that evil spirit, and evil spirit craves them. Since a holy spirit normally descends and is garbed there, it does not remain in its midst, fleeing, flying upward, while that garment is inveigled by an evil spirit which casts it beyond. Afterward, it is judged in Hell, remaining there until the person arrives, donning it in Hell—judged in it every day (69a). "Woman of whoredom landed, along with the one who rides and presides over her—heartless one, inducing all to deviate. They gazed upon the supernal glory of Adam and his wife. Woman of whoredom, strengthened by the force and power of the one who rules over her. She sidled up to Eve, beginning to allure her with copious enticements, numerous blandishments—until she was finally beguiled. Then, Adam was inveigled and those garments flew off him. Soul—radiance from speculum above—vanished. And he was left utterly naked—he and his wife (69a).

==== Tosefta ====
During the purification of Gevurah (which is signified by Isaac), a smoky wreath oozes and seeks a resting place, which it cannot find. It is personified by Avadon/Oblivion, which is Samael, and Mavet/Death, the wife of whoredom, referencing Proverbs 5:5 "her feet descend to death". Samael and Lilith, even in their depravity, heard of God's plans to obliterate them and those who are drawn after them. They bring annihilation and as such are the opposite of God who brings life. Hecker comments that this passage refers to entities that arise in the upper reaches of the Sefirot but cannot endure.

==== Sitrei Torah/Vayetzei ====
Jacob, beginning his mystical journey to Beersheba (signifying Shekhinah), had to be tested the same way his forefathers were, by withstanding demonic forces. Some failed, like Adam, who was seduced by the woman of whoredom, the primordial Serpent, and Noah, who was enticed by her in the form of intoxicating wine. Jacob left the side of holiness to be tested by the Other Side:

Mystery of mysteries: Out of the scorching noon of Isaac (Gevurah), out of the dregs of wine, a cramped cluster—male and female together, crimson as a rose, splitting in many directions and paths. The male, called Samael, his female always contained within him. Just as it is on the side of holiness, so it is on the Other Side: male and female embracing one another. Samael’s woman is called Serpent, Woman of Whoredom, End of All Flesh, End of Days. Two vile spirits joined as one: spirit of the male is subtle; the spirit of the female diffused in many ways and paths, but joined to the spirit of the male (148a).

It's said that the woman of whoredom adorns herself in jewelry, seducing men, pouring them wine, and they end up straying after her. Those who drink from the cup of wine and fornicate with her, she leaves lying asleep in bed, and in her place returns the Angel of Death, Samael, who kills the man and sends him to Hell. Jacob journeyed to her place, exposing himself to demonic influence, saw all the trappings and was saved from her, which led Samael to wage war against him, but fail to defeat him.

==== Bereshit ====
A Woman of Strength, Shekhinah, is said by Rabbi Shim'on to be "her husband's crown". A person must not then pursue another deity, the Woman of Whoredom, which is the demonic feminine, and here signifies the "strange woman, foreign woman whose talk is smooth", equated with other gods and evil impulses.

==== Pekudei ====
Hosea was required to take a woman of whoredom in order to understand Israel's sin, as Israel went astray, was lured to the Woman of Whoredom (Lilith), and did not follow the Woman of Valor (Shekhinah).

==== Piqqudin ====
An omer offering, made of barley and usually offered to a suspected adulteress, is brought to Shekhinah, to purify her of demonic contamination, enabling her to unite with her husband Tiferet and the children of Israel. The omer sacrifice prevents the Other Side from approaching Shekhinah and interfering in her union with Tiferet.

Lilith, the Woman of Whoredom, distances herself during this examination, and flees from the Sanctuary (Israel), for were she to approach, she would perish from the world. The text presents Shekhinah and Lilith as two sisters, and the examination of the Woman of Strength (Shekhinah) as deadly poison for the Woman of Whoredom.

=== Pardes Rimmonim ===
Pardes Rimmonim (Orchard of Pomegranates, composed in 1548) mentions two Liliths, the Elder and the Younger one. The Elder Lilith, who is a woman of harlotry, is the wife of Samael, while the Younger one is the wife of Ashmedai.

=== Emeq HaMelekh ===
Emeq HaMelekh (Valley of the King), written by Naftali Hertz ben Yaakov Elchanan (Bacharach) presents Lilith, the Woman of Harlotry, as the tempting serpent of Eve.

And the Serpent, the Woman of Harlotry, incited and seduced Eve through the husks of Light which in itself is holiness. And the Serpent seduced Holy Eve, and enough said for him who understands. And all this ruination came about because Adam the first man coupled with Eve while she was in her menstrual impurity – this is the filth and the impure seed of the Serpent who mounted Eve before Adam mounted her. Behold, here it is before you: because of the sins of Adam the first man all the things mentioned came into being. For Evil Lilith, when she saw the greatness of his corruption, became strong in her husks, and came to Adam against his will, and became hot from him and bore him many demons and spirits and Lilin. (23c-d).

== Western Esotericism ==
In Mathers' Kabbalah Unveiled, Isheth Zenunim (ASHTH ZNVNIM) is mentioned as the wife of Samael (the angel of poison and death), and united they're called the beast, CHIVA, Chioa.

The same passage is quoted in Crowley's Liber 777. According to him, Isheth Zenunim (mother of the Beast) is a Princess of the Qliphoth.

In Gustav Davidson's A Dictionary of Angels, Eisheth Zenunim is identified as an "angel of prostitution". Davidson quotes Robert Masters, who claims that Kabbalists believe there to be evil angels, who are not to be mistaken for demons, and that one such angel is "Isheth Zemunin, the Angel of Prostitution, who is the wife of Samael, Angel of Poison and Death". Masters does not cite any sources that can support this claim.

== See also ==
- Lilith
- Shekhinah
- Agrat bat Mahlat
- Lilin
- Mahalath (demon)
- Naamah
- Samael
- Zohar
