= Mahalath (demon) =

Demon Queen in Jewish mythology

Mahalath (Hebrew: מָחֲלַת, also spelled Mahalat, Mahlat(h), Machlat(h), Machalat) is a queen of demons that appears in Jewish mysticism, most known for being the mother of Agrat (or Igrat). Sources on Mahalath are scarce. She is a wife of Esau and daughter of Ishmael, like the biblical Mahalath, who she derives from. Mahalath is also a wife of Samael, along with Lilith, Na'amah and Agrat. Mahalath is sometimes replaced by Rahab.

In modern literature, the name Mahalath is sometimes replaced by Eisheth Zenunim when enumerating the wives of Samael, who in the Zohar is an epithet of Lilith.

== History ==
=== Rabbinic Literature ===
In relation to demons, Mahalath appears as a name in the Talmud and Midrash only as a description of her daughter, Agrat bat Mahalath.

=== Kabbalah ===
Some references to Mahalath are made in Kabbalistic literature.

==== Zohar ====
In the Zohar, it is forbidden to mix one's seed with the family of Mahalath, or a foreign god, whose seed is evil. In doing so, one would transgress the command of God.

==== Pardes Rimmonim ====
Pardes Rimmonim (Orchard of Pomegranates, 1548) by Moses Cordovero, leader of the Safed Kabbalists, references the two Liliths, and describes an encounter between Lilith the Elder and Mahalath, both of whom are brides of Samael. They meet and argue in the desert on the Day of the Atonement, where Lilith screeches along with her 480 legions, for she is the princess of screeching, and Mahalath sings in the Holy Tongue songs and paeans, accompanied by her 478 legions. Their voices rise up to heaven, and earth shakes with their clamor. This is caused by God, so the demons don't bother Israelites while they pray.

==== Kol Bokhim ====
Kol/Qol Bokhim (1589), by Abraham ben Mordecai Galante, recounts the same story of Mahalath and Lilith's encounter in the desert, but described Mahalath differently. According to him, Mahalath is shown by the etymology of her name to be a compulsive dancer: she dances in the desert as the leader of her destructive angels, until she meets with Lilith and the two begin to fight.

=== Other Sources ===
==== School of RaShBa ====
After retelling myths of the Tanakh, the text mentions that:

All [the four queens of the demons, Lilith, lgrat, Mahalath and Naamah] and all their cohorts give birth to children, except Lilith alone, who does not bear, but is just a fornication in the world.

==== Sefer Meir T'hillot ====
Sefer Meir T'hillot/Meïr Tehillot (The Illuminator of the Psalms, 1512), describes Agrat's genealogy, and gives her a mixed Egyptian-Arab and demonic descent. Ishmael, son of Abraham, had a wife, daughter of Kasdiel, the Egyptian sorcerer. Ishmael divorced her (as instructed by his father) while she was pregnant, and she gave birth to Mahalath. They stayed in the Egyptian desert, which was ruled by the demon Igratiel (or Igrathiel), surrounded by sorcery. Igratiel was attracted to Mahalath, and she bore from him a daughter, Igrat, named after the spirit. Afterwards, Mahalath left the desert and became the wife of Esau, while Igrat stayed, and ruled over the two solstices and equinoxes (Tequfot) along with the demons Lilith (as Pelonith), Na'amah and Nega.

==== Rabbeinu Bahya ====
Rabbi Bahya ben Asher has made commentary (1546) on Genesis 4:22. Mahalath is one of the four wives of Samael, along with Lilith, Na'amah, and Agrat, her daughter. In imitation of Samael, Esau (the husband of Mahalath as explained in the book of Genesis) also himself took four wives.

Four women were the mothers of demons: Lilith, Naamah, Igrath, and Mahalath. Each one of them has her own hosts and classes of spirits of uncleanness, and they have no number. And it is said that each of them rules on one of the four Tequfot [i.e., the vernal equinox, the summer solstice, the autumnal equinox, and the winter solstice] of the years, when they gather on a lofty peak near the Mountains of Darkness. Each of them rules on her Tequfa, from the hour of sunset until midnight, they and all their hosts. But King Solomon ruled over all of them and called them [his] slaves and slave-women and used them according to his will. And these four women are the wives of Esau’s heavenly patron [i.e., Samael], and following his example, Esau himself took four wives, as explained in the Pentateuch (4:22:2).

==== Manuscripts ====
Mahalath is mentioned in 18th century manuscripts. On one occasion (MS Bill Gross, EE.011.039, f. 88a.), she is named along with Liliths, and denied the power to harm or switch the fetus in the womb. On another manuscript, Mahalath is invoked with the purpose to be bound, along with Lilith, Agrat and the Queen of Sheba (MS 180/017, f. 170b.)

== See also ==
- Lilith
- Lilin
- Agrat bat Mahlat
- Mahalath
- Naamah (demon)
- Eisheth Zenunim
- Rahab
- Succubus
- Samael
- Esau
- Ishmael
