= Naamah (demon) =

Jewish demonic creature

Naamah (Hebrew: נַעֲמָה; "pleasant", also spelled Naama, Na'ama(h), Nahema(h), Nahemoth) is a demon described in the Zohar, a foundational work of Jewish mysticism. She originated from and is often conflated with another Naamah, sister to Tubal-cain, mentioned in the Book of Genesis. In Kabbalistic sources, she's one of the four brides of Samael, along with Lilith, Agrat bat Mahalath and Mahalath. Eisheth Zenunim (woman of whoredom/harlotry), an epithet of Lilith, is contemporarily personified as a separate demonic entity.

== History ==
=== Rabbinic Literature ===
In Talmudic-midrashic literature, Naamah is indistinguishable from the human Naamah, who earned her name by seducing men through her play of cymbals, and led the ministering angels astray, which led to the creation of the Nephilim. She also enticed the angel Shamdon/Shomron and bore Ashmodai, the king of devils. It was later, in Kabbalistic literature like the Zohar, that she became an inhuman spirit.

=== Kabbalah ===
==== Zohar ====
===== Haqdamat (Introduction) =====
In the Zohar, Na'amah attracts demons, and is continuously chased by demon kings Afrira and Qastimon every night, but she leaps away every time and takes multiple forms to entice men.

===== Bereshit =====
With her beauty, Na'amah corrupted Ouza and Azazel, who were part of the group of angels known as the Watchers. From them, she bore spirits who spread out into the world, and together they wander around at night, cause nocturnal emissions in humans, and if they find them sleeping alone, they hover over them, cling to them and have their offspring. In addition, they afflict them with sickness, and all of this happens during the waning of the moon (when the light of Shekinah diminishes).

In a later passage, Rabbi Hiya said: "And the sister of Tubal-Cain was Na'amah. Why does the Scripture particularly mention Na'amah? The reason is that she was the great seducer not only of men, but also of spirits and demons". It continues with Rabbi Isaac:

the sons of man, and even the spirits and demons, went astray after her. R. Yitzḥaq said: Those sons of God, ‘Aza and ‘Aza’el, went astray after her. R. Shimeon said: She was the mother of the demons, for she came from the side of Cain, and she, together with Lilith, was appointed over the askara [strangulation] of children. R. Abba said to him: Did you not say that she was appointed to play with people? He answered: True; she comes and plays with people and at times she bears them spirit-children, and to this day this is her task. R. Abba said: [Since we know that the demons] die like humans, how can she still be alive? He answered: Right, but Lilith and Naamah, and Agrath, the daughter of Mahalath who came from their side, all continue to live until the Holy One, blessed be He, eradicates the spirit of uncleanness from the world. Come and see: This Naamah was the mother of demons, and from her side come all those demons who lie with men and take the spirit of desire from them, and she makes sport with the men [in their sleep] and causes them to emit seed.

===== Achrei Mot =====
After Cain kills Abel, Adam separates from Eve for 130 years. Two female spirits (which are assumed by some to be Lilith and Na'amah) (Note: One such scholar is Raphael Patai in "The Hebrew Goddess" under "Lilith and Adam": According to the Zohar, two female spirits, Lilith and Naamah—found [Adam], desired his beauty, which was like that of the sun disk, and lay with him.) seduced him and bore from him demons, who were called the "plagues of the children of men". After demons, Adam then engendered daughters with the beauty of heavenly and lower beings, that led the angels (Genesis 6:2) astray.

Eve bore Cain from the Serpent (Samael), and the male that came from the side of the spirit of Cain was called Tubal-Cain. Na'amah came with him, from whom issued all spirits and demons, who hover in the air and inform those below. Na'amah "still exists", living among the waves of the great sea, and seduces men, conceiving from them through their lustful dreams, bringing further species into the world. Her sons visit the mortal women, who conceive from them and give birth to spirits, who then go to Lilith and she raises them.

If a man gets aroused by Na'amah and has intercourse with his wife, any child born from that conception is from the side of Na'amah, since this occurred out of lust for her. When Lilith finds the child and realises what has happened, she raises him like the other children of Na'amah and does not kill him. Every new moon, Lilith comes up and toys with him, and that child suffers damage in the process. This may allude to epileptic seizures, brought about by different phases of the moon.

==== Zohar Chadash ====
===== Bereshit =====
The text analyses the reference of Na'amah in the Book of Genesis. Na'amah is the mother of the demon king Asmodeus/Ashmedai.

Rabbi Yitsḥak said, “Why is it written And the sister of Tubal-Cain was נעמה (Na'amah), Na'amah (Genesis 4:22)?”

Well, Rabbi Yitsḥak said, “She was a righteous woman and נעימה (ne’imah), pleasing, in her deeds.”

Rabbi Abbahu said, “The simple sense of Scripture indicates that she was learned in metal-working, like her brother Tubal-Cain, as implied by what is written: he was the progenitor of every implement of bronze and iron—and the sister of Tubal-Cain, Na'amah (ibid.). He invented this craft and his sister with him, as is written: and the sister of Tubal-Cain, Na'amah—she was skilled like him. The ‘and’ of ‘and the sister’ joins the preceding statement.”

Rabbi Bo said, “She was the mother of demons; she bore them. For look, the mother of Ashmedai, king of the demons, is named Na'amah.

===== Midrash ha-Ne'lam al Rut =====
Na'amah was present in the events of Genesis 6:2-4, and seduced angels.

Rabbi Neḥemiah said in the name of Rabbi Yehudah, “Na'amah was around at that time, and everyone was seduced by her.”

Rabbi Shalom says, “She was the mother of demons. When the sons of God saw the daughters of humankind, they strayed after them, because the daughters of humankind were strolling naked. They had intercourse with them and had children from them. This is as is written: and afterward as well—when the sons of God…אנשי שם (anshei shem), men of renown (Genesis 6:4).

“Who are the אנשי שם (anshei shem), men of the name…? These are the fallen ones (ibid.), who taught the world names for each and every thing, consummating their sorcery.”

==== Sefer ‘Etz Ḥayyim ====
According to Ḥayyim Vital, a disciple of Isaac Luria, the demon queen Lilith rules over Rome, Agrat over Salamanca, Rahab over Egypt and Na'amah over Damascus.

==== Emeq haMelekh ====
In Emeq haMelekh (Valley of the King, 1648), a demon named Asimon rides on Na'amah, who rides on Agrat bat Mahalath, who herself rides on several kinds of spirits and mid-day demons.

==== Tuv haAretz ====
According to Nathan Spira in Tuv haAretz (1655), Samael was given four kingdoms, and in each of them he has a concubine; their names are Lilith, Naamah, Even Maskith and Agrat, the daughter of Mahalath. The four kingdoms are the Kingdom of Damascus, Kingdom of Tyre (which is opposite of Israel), Kingdom of Malta (formerly called Rhodus), and the Kingdom called Granata, that some say is the Kingdom of Ishmael.

=== Commentary ===
==== Bahya ben Asher on Genesis ====
According to Bahya ben Asher's commentary on Genesis (1546 CE), Naamah is one of the mates of the archangel Samael, along with Lilith, Agrat bat Mahlat and Mahlat. It is stated that Esau took four wives in imitation of Samael. Bahya ben Asher discusses how the book of Genesis says that the sister of Tubal-Cain was Na'amah, how in Bereshit Rabbah she became the wife of Noah, and how it's claimed that her name reflects her lovely disposition and good deeds. He presents a different tradition, in which Na'amah is the wife of the demon Ashmadon, and bore the demon Asmodeus and others:

Four women were the mothers of demons: Lilith, Naamah, Igrath, and Mahalath. Each one of them has her own hosts and classes of spirits of uncleanness, and they have no number. And it is said that each of them rules on one of the four Tequfot [i.e., the vernal equinox, the summer solstice, the autumnal equinox, and the winter solstice] of the years, when they gather on a lofty peak near the Mountains of Darkness. Each of them rules on her Tequfa, from the hour of sunset until midnight, they and all their hosts. But King Solomon ruled over all of them and called them [his] slaves and slave-women and used them according to his will. And these four women are the wives of Esau’s heavenly patron [i.e., Samael], and following his example, Esau himself took four wives, as explained in the Pentateuch (4:22:2).

=== Other Sources ===
==== Book of Mirrors ====
In Sefer Mar'ot Hatsov'ot (Book of Mirrors), David Ben Yehuda Hahasid (after 1293 CE.), mentions that:

And Naamah exists to this day, and dwells in the depths of the great sea and emerges and trifles with humans and seduces them in their dreams.

==== School of RaShBA ====
The demon queens, meaning Na'amah, Agrat and Mahalath, and all their cohors give birth to children, except for Lilith, who is fornication alone.

==== Kav HaYashar ====
Tzvi Hirsch Kaidanover (c. 1665–1705) in Kav HaYashar (17:6) expands on Zohar's Achrei Mot:

If a man sees the image of a woman in a dream, even if it is the image of his wife or an unmarried woman, and awakens filled with passion and desire he must not have relations with his wife in the heat of that desire. For if he does so, the child thus conceived will be subject to epileptic attacks whenever the moon is full, Heaven forbid, with no possibility of a cure his entire life. For the image that appeared to him was the female demon known as Na'amah. Thus the Zohar (Part III 77a) writes: “since it was out of desire for her (i.e., Na'amah) that he had relations, the child will be born from her side … and so he will be affected at each and every moon.”

== Syncretism ==
Na'amah, the sister of Tubal-Cain, is believed by some to be the scriptural basis for the Gnostic Norea, sister of Seth. Birger Pearson argues that Norea has been developed out of the Jewish material featuring Na'amah. Norea might be etymologically connected to ὡραία (horaia, "pleasant"), the Greek equivalent of Hebrew Na'amah. Na'amah's role as the seductress of the "sons of God" (Watchers) has been inverted in Gnostic literature, where Norea evades her rape by the archons.

Pearson concluded that the Gnostic myths surrounding Norea and the Jewish myths about Na'amah are the same or similar: she's the wife/sister of Seth (the source for Na'amah is Pseudo-Philo and Jerahmeel) or Noah, attempts to thwart the construction of the ark (in Na'amah's case the myth is derived from medieval legends in English and Slavonic) and attracts the attention of angelic beings. The name Na'amah might have changed to Norea due to a translation by Greek-speaking Jewish communities.

== See also ==
- Lilith
- Agrat bat Mahlat
- Mahalath (demon)
- Eisheth Zenunim
- Lilin
- Zohar
- Asmodeus
- Azazel
- Samael
