= Tanin'iver =

Tanin'iver (compd. of Heb. תַנִין, "dragon" + עִוֵר, "sightless" — the "blind dragon") is an evil cosmic entity described in Kabbalistic writings, such as the Treatise on the Left Emanation and the Zohar. He is the steed of Lilith, so he is considered a mechanism by which evil is activated. Though Tanin'iver is castrated (echoing a fable about the Yetzer ha-Ra), he is still the catalyst for the coupling of Lilith with Samael, a union that brings pestilence into the world.
