= Isaac ben Jacob ha-Cohen =

Spanish-born Jewish kabbalist

Isaac ben Jacob ha-Cohen (second half of 13th century) was a Spanish-born Jewish kabbalist. With his younger brother Jacob he traveled Spain and Provence in search for ancient kabbalistic traditions, which they gathered and incorporated into their writings.

Isaac held a prominent position within the Gnostic circle of Spanish Kabbalah. His writings contain valuable content that distinguishes him from his contemporaries. Some of his work was incorporated and, at times, modified by his student, Moses Ben Solomon of Burgos.

Isaac ben Jacob ha-Cohen is the author of the Treatise on the Left Emanation, a foundational work in the mythological concept of evil, which influenced later works like the Zohar. The treatise is also notorious for being one of the sources of the myths around the demons Samael and Lilith.

== Bibliography ==
- Scholem, Gershom (1991). Origins of the Kabbalah. The Jewish Publication Society, Princeton University Press. ISBN 0691020477.
