= Samael =

Jewish archangel

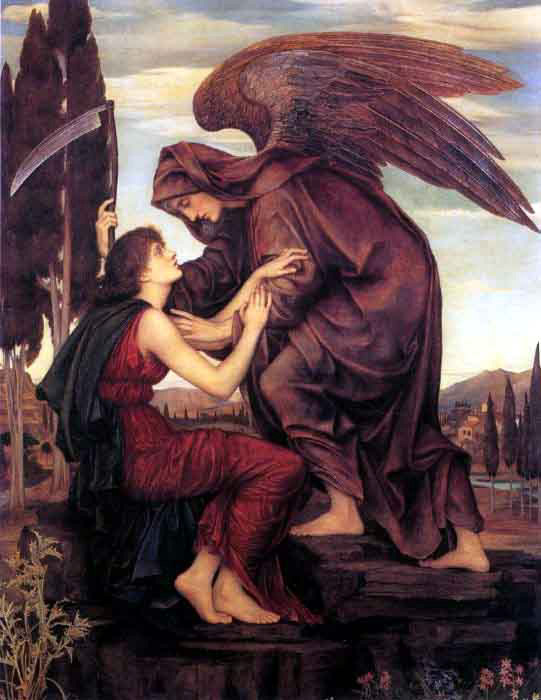
Angel of Death I (1880) by Evelyn De Morgan

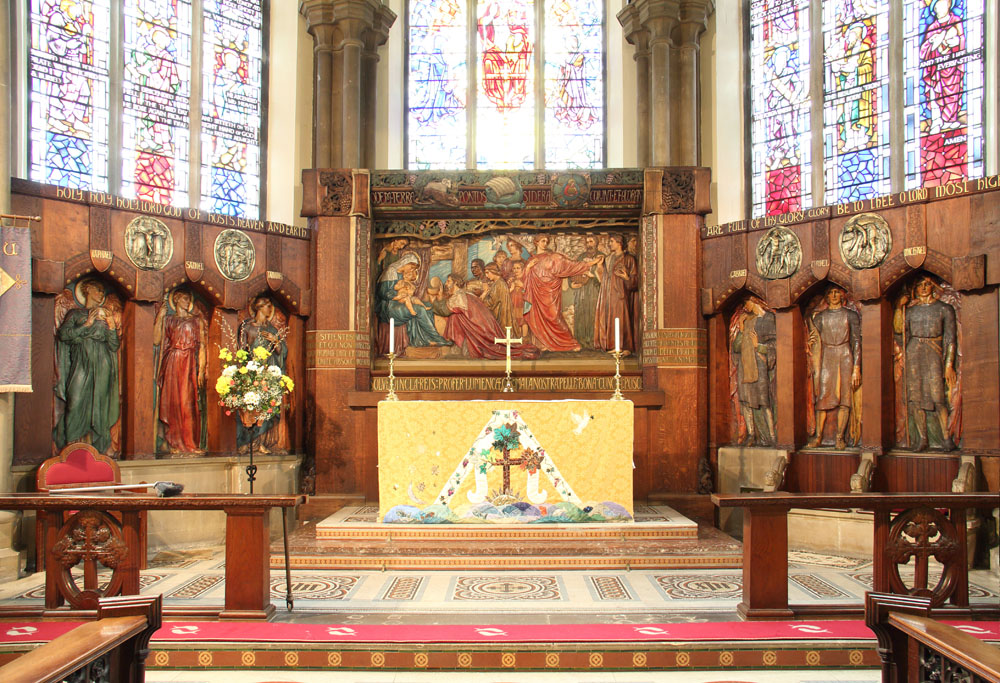
A relief of the Archangel Samael in red robe, shown on the left side of the altar at Saint Bartholomew's Church, in Sydenham, London.

Samael (/ˈsæmiɛl/ SAM-ee-el; Hebrew: סַמָּאֵל, romanized: Sammāʾēl, lit. 'Venom of God'; Arabic: سمسمائيل, romanized: Samsamāʾīl, سمائل, Sammāʾil, or سامائيل, Sāmāʾīl), also spelled Smil, Samil, or Samiel, is an archangel in Talmudic and post-Talmudic tradition—‌a figure who is the accuser or adversary (Satan in the Book of Job), seducer, and destroying angel (in the Book of Exodus, though neither Job nor Exodus mentions Samael).

Although many of his functions resemble the Christian notion of Satan, to the point of being sometimes identified as a fallen angel, he is not necessarily evil, since his functions are also regarded as resulting in good, such as destroying sinners.

He is considered in Midrashic texts to be a member of the heavenly host with often grim and destructive duties. One of Samael's most significant roles in Jewish lore is that of the main angel of death and the head of satans. He appears frequently in the story of the Garden of Eden and engineered the fall of Adam and Eve with a snake in writings during the Second Temple period. However, the serpent is not a form of Samael, but a beast he rode like a camel. In a single account he is also believed to be the father of Cain, as well as the partner of Lilith. In early Talmudic and Midrashic literature, he has not yet been identified with Satan. Only in later midrashim is he entitled "head of satans".

As guardian angel and prince of Rome, he is the arch enemy of Israel. By the beginning of Jewish culture in Europe, Samael had been established as a representative of Christianity due to his identification with Rome.

In some Gnostic cosmologies, Samael's role as a source of evil became identified with the Demiurge, the creator of the material world. Although probably both accounts originate from the same source, the Gnostic development of Samael differs from the Jewish development of Samael, in which Samael is merely an angel and messenger of God.

== Judaism ==
=== Second Temple period and posteriority ===
Samael was first mentioned during the Second Temple period and immediately after its destruction. He is first mentioned in the Book of Enoch, which is a part of the Jewish apocrypha, along with other rebellious angels. In Enoch 1, he is one of the Watchers who descended to Earth to copulate with human women, although he is not their leader, this being Samyaza.

In the Greek Apocalypse of Baruch, he is the dominant evil figure. Samael plants the Tree of the Knowledge of Good and Evil, thereupon he is banished and cursed by God. To take revenge, he tempts Adam and Eve into sin by taking the form of the serpent.

He appears further as the embodiment of evil in the Ascension of Isaiah and is called by various names:

- Melkira (Hebrew: מלך רע) "king of evil/wicked"
- Malkira / Malchira (מלאך רע) "Messenger of evil"
- Belkira prob. (בעל קיר) "lord of the wall"
- Bechira (בחיר רע) "elect/chosen of evil"

The names Belial and Satan are also applied to him, and he gains control of King Manasseh to accuse Isaiah of treason.

=== Talmudic-Midrashic literature ===
In Talmudic and midrash, Samael's role as an agent of evil is relatively marginal. However, from the fifth or sixth century onward, he becomes one of the most prominent among the demonic entities. Samael has not been identified with the angel of death in the Talmud.

In the Exodus Rabbah, Samael is depicted as the accuser in the heavenly court and tempter to sin, while Michael defends Israel's actions. Here, Samael is identified with Satan. While Satan describes his function as an "accuser," Samael is considered his proper name. He also fulfills the role of the Angel of Death when he comes to take the body of Moses and is called the leader of Satan.

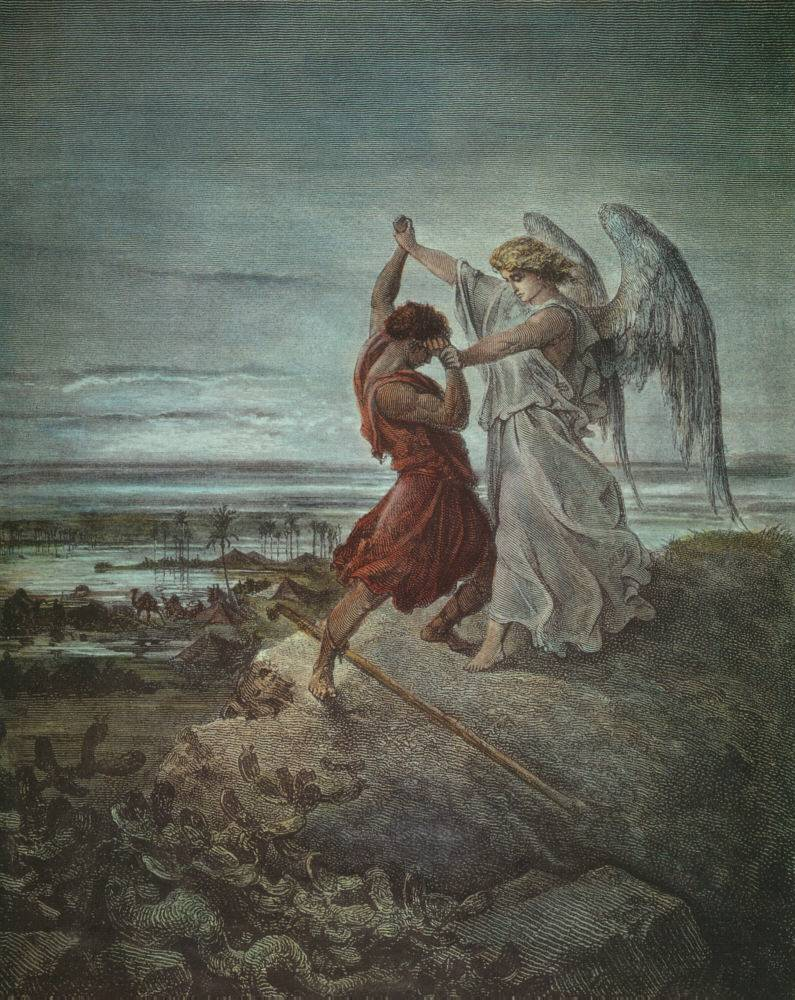
Jacob Wrestling with the Angel, Gustave Doré (1855)

The title of satan is also applied to him in the midrash Pirkei De-Rabbi Eliezer, where he is the chief of the fallen angels, and a twelve-winged seraph. According to the text, Samael opposed the creation of Adam and descended to Earth to tempt him into evil. Riding the serpent, he convinces Eve to eat the forbidden fruit. His role here might be inspired by the Islamic idea of Iblis, who refused to prostrate himself before Adam because he consists of fire and Adam merely from dust. The midrash also reveals Samael fathered Cain with Eve.

In the smaller midrashim, he is the ruler of hell. Several sources, such as Yalkut Shimoni (I, 110) describe him as the guardian angel of Esau relating him to Rome, the one who wrestled with Jacob, the angel who ordered Abraham to sacrifice Isaac, and a patron of Edom.

=== Kabbalah ===
In Kabbalah, Samael is described as the "severity of God" and is listed as fifth of the archangels of the world of Beri'ah. Among his portions are Esau, the people who inherit the sword and bring war; the goats and se'irim (demons); and the destroyer angels.

==== Treatise on the Left Emanation ====
Although both Samael and Lilith are major demons in earlier Jewish traditions, they do not appear paired until the second half of the thirteenth century, when they are introduced together. Lilith, a demon blamed for infant mortality, is dual in the Treatise on the Left Emanation, where the Elder Lilith becomes Samael's bride, who is the prince of all demons. The two are said to parallel Adam and Eve, being emanated together from the Throne of Glory as a counterpart. Asmodeus is also mentioned to be subservient to Samael and married to a Younger or Lesser Lilith, which caused Samael to grow jealous of him. From them, a prince is born in heaven, named Alefpene'ash or Gurigur, also called the "Sword of Asmodeus".

==== Zohar ====
In the Zohar, one of Kabbalah's principal works, Samael is described as a leader of the divine forces of destruction, ruler of the Sitra Ahra and mate of Lilith, who is also called the Woman of Whoredom (Eisheth Zenunim). He is described as the "shadow of death", the serpent that seduced Eve, while also being mentioned as the serpent's rider.

==== Moses of Burgos ====
The texts attributed to Moses ben Solomon of Burgos, a 13th century pre-Zoharic Kabbalist, focus on the problem of evil.

Know that all the jealousy and altercation between the Princes of Quarrel and the Princes of Peace ... is on account of Samael and Lilith who is called Northerner (Tzefonit), as it is written "Out of the North, the Evil One shall break forth". Both of them [Samael and Lilith] were born in a spiritual birth as androgynes, corresponding to Adam and Eve—below and above two twin figures. And Samael and Lilith the Elder, who is the same as Tzefonit, are referred to as the Tree of Knowledge of Good and Evil.

==== Pardes Rimmonim ====
Pardes Rimmonim (Orchard of the Pomegranates) by Moses Cordovero, composed in 1548, expands on the relationship between Samael and Lilith. Tanin'iver, the Blind Dragon, is described as the intermediary who arranges their match. From Tanin'iver, who is their groomsman, they receive an emanation of evil and insolence, flowing from the one to the other. On the Day of Atonement, God will slay Leviathan that is in the Sea, who is the connection between them, so he'll punish Leviathan the Slant Serpent, who is Samael, and Leviathan the Tortuous Serpent, corresponding with Lilith.

Lilith is also not the sole wife of Samael, as so is Mahalath, the daughter of Ishmael. The text describes the battle between Lilith and Mahalath on the Day of Atonement.

==== Emeq haMelekh ====
Lilith, the Tortuous Serpent, leaves the husband of her youth Samael, the Slant Serpent, to fornicate with men. She cannot mate with her husband, as God "cooled" her (made her barren) and castrated the male Leviathan (Samael). Tanin'iver, who brings about the union between Samael and Lilith, will swallow a lethal potion in the future, which will cause Gabriel and Michael to join forces and bring low the "government of evil", which will ultimately result in Lilith's death.

==== Tuv haAretz ====
According to Nathan Spira in Tuv haAretz (1655), Samael and Rahab rule seventy heavenly patrons, appointed over each nation. Samael was given four kingdoms, and in each of them he has a concubine: his first bride Lilith, Na'amah, Agrat bat Mahalath and Even Maskith, and they rule over the Kingdoms of Damascus, Tyre, Malta and the one called Granata.

=== Other traditions ===
According to Bahya ben Asher, in his commentary on Genesis 4:22:3, there are four mothers of demons, Lilith, Na'amah, Agrat and Mahalath, who rule over the four Tequfot (equinoxes and solstices). These four women are the wives of Samael, called Esau's heavenly patron, and following his example, Esau himself also took four wives, as explained in the Pentateuch.

Baal Shem Tov was said to have summoned Samael to make him do his bidding.

Samael is also depicted as the angel of death and one of the seven archangels, the ruler over the Fifth Heaven and commander of two million angels such as the chief of all the destroying angels.

According to the apocryphal Gedulat Moshe (The Apocalypse of Moses, "The Ascension of Moses" in The Legends of the Jews by Louis Ginzberg) Samael is also mentioned as being in 7th Heaven:

In the last heaven Moses saw two angels, each five hundred parasangs in height, forged out of chains of black fire and red fire, the angels Af, "Anger", and Hemah, "Wrath", whom God created at the beginning of the world, to execute His will. Moses was disquieted when he looked upon them, but Metatron embraced him, and said, "Moses, Moses, thou favorite of God, fear not, and be not terrified," and Moses became calm. There was another angel in the seventh heaven, different in appearance from all the others, and of frightful mien. His height was so great, it would have taken five hundred years to cover a distance equal to it, and from the crown of his head to the soles of his feet he was studded with glaring eyes. "This one," said Metatron, addressing Moses, "is Samael, who takes the soul away from man." "Whither goes he now?" asked Moses, and Metatron replied, "To fetch the soul of Job the pious." Thereupon Moses prayed to God in these words, "O may it be Thy will, my God and the God of my fathers, not to let me fall into the hands of this angel."

== Gnosticism ==
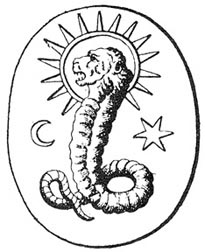
A lion-faced deity found on a Gnostic gem in Bernard de Montfaucon's L'antiquité expliquée et représentée en figures may be a depiction of the Demiurge, Samael.

In the Apocryphon of John, On the Origin of the World, and Hypostasis of the Archons, found in the Nag Hammadi library, Samael is one of three names of the demiurge, whose other names are Yaldabaoth and Saklas.

After Yaldabaoth claims sole divinity for himself, the voice of Sophia comes forth calling him Samael, due to his ignorance. In On the Origin of the World, his name is explained as "blind god" and his fellow Archons are said to be blind, too. This reflects the characteristics of the Christian devil, making people blind, as does the devil in 2 Corinthians 4. Also Samael is the first sinner in the Hypostasis of the Archons and the First Epistle of John calls the devil as sinner from the beginning. These characteristics combined with his boasting conflates the Jewish god with the devil. His appearance is that of a lion-faced serpent. Although the Gnostics and Jewish originally used the same source, both depictions of Samael developed independently.

Samael is sometimes confused in some books with Camael, who appears in the Coptic Gospel of the Egyptians also as an evil power, whose name is similar to words meaning "like God" (but Camael with a waw missing). The name might be explained, because in Jewish traditions, the snake had the form of a camel, before it was banished by God.

== Anthroposophy ==
To anthroposophists, Samael is known as one of the seven archangels. They are all imagined to have a special assignment to act as a global zeitgeist ('time-spirit'), each for periods of about 360 years.

== In popular culture ==
- In Carl Maria von Weber's 1821 opera Der Freischütz, the Devil-like Black Huntsman is named Samiel, probably derived from Samael.
- In The Wheel of Time, one of the Forsaken is named Sammael, a reference to Samael.
- In the Megami Tensei videogame franchise and many of its spin-offs, Samael appears as one of the Demons in various games.
  - In Persona 5 Tactica, the Final Boss is called Salmael, a reference to Samael
- In The Sandman comic book series by Neil Gaiman, Samael is the original name of Lucifer Morningstar.
- In the sixth episode of the season one of Lucifer, Linda tells Lucifer that one of his names before the fall was Samael.
- In the Darksiders video game franchise Samael is a demon lord, heavily implied to be a fallen angel.
- In the seventh episode of season three of Record of Ragnarok, Samael is depicted as one of three angels, alongside Lucifer and Azazel, who befriend Beelzebub.
- In the Corto Maltese comic book series by Hugo Pratt, Samael (or Shamael depending on the edition) is an Ethiopian shaman and hermit who claims to be the earthly incarnation of the archangel.
- The puzzle video game Helltaker features a gender-swapped, fallen, demonic version of Samael who goes by the name "Judgement" as the game's final boss. Their identity as Samael was revealed in an official comic series posted to the creator's social media.

== See also ==
- Azazel
- Asmodeus
- Camael
- Lilith
- Eisheth Zenunim
- List of angels in theology
