= Hanina ben Dosa =

Mishnah Rabbi

Hanina ben Dosa (Hebrew: חנינא בן דוסא) was a Jewish sage, miracle worker, and student of Rabbi Yohanan ben Zakkai during the early or middle first and second centuries CE. He is buried in the town of Arraba, Israel, in the Lower Galilee.

== Biography ==
Hanina lived in the Galilee, attracted by the fame of Rabbi Yohanan ben Zakkai. There Hanina is told by the Jerusalem Talmud to have served as an example of Shabbat observance, and he and his wife are buried in the Galilee.

While he is reckoned among the Tannaim and quoted in connection with a tannaitic school and its disciples, no specific halakhot, and but few aggadot, are preserved as from him. He is "remembered more for his conduct than for his halakhic teachings. There are no laws quoted in his name."

== Legends ==
There is a story which relates that when the son of Johanan ben Zakai was very sick, the father solicited the prayers of Hanina. Hanina readily complied, and the child recovered. The overjoyed father could not refrain from expressing his admiration for his wonderful pupil, stating that he himself might have prayed the whole day without doing any good. His wife, astonished at such self-abasement on the part of her famous husband, inquired, "Is Hanina greater than you?" To this he replied, "There is this difference between us: he is like the body-servant of a king, having at all times free access to the august presence, without even having to await permission to reach his ears; while I, like a lord before a king, must await an opportune moment".

Another tale states that, at the solicitation of Gamaliel II, Hanina entreated mercy for that patriarch's son, and at the conclusion of his prayers assured Gamaliel's messengers that the patient's fever had left him. This assurance created doubt in the minds of the messengers, who promptly asked, "Art thou a prophet?" To this he replied, "I am neither a prophet nor the son of a prophet; but experience has taught me that whenever my prayer flows freely it is granted; otherwise, it is rejected." The messengers thereupon noted down Hanina's declaration, and the exact time when it was made; on reaching the patriarch's residence they found that Hanina had spoken truly.

Another legend states that, while traveling, he was caught in a shower and prayed "Master of the universe, the whole world is pleased, while Hanina alone is annoyed." The rain immediately ceased. Arriving home, he altered his prayer: "Master of the universe, shall all the world be grieved while Hanina enjoys his comfort?" Thereupon copious showers descended. With reference to this legend it was said, "Beside Ben Dosa's prayers those of the high priest himself are of no avail".

When, one Shabbat eve, his daughter filled the lamp with vinegar instead of oil, and then sadly told him of her mistake, he remarked, "He who hath endowed oil with the power of burning may endow vinegar with the same power"; and the lamp burned on throughout the whole of the next day.

According to legend, Hanina was very poor. Indeed, it became proverbial that, while the whole world was provided for through Hanina's great merits, he himself sustained life from one Sabbath eve to another on a basket of carob beans. For some time the outside world had been kept in ignorance of his privations; his wife did all that was possible to maintain an appearance of comfort, and though she had no flour with which to make dough, she would put fuel into the oven every Friday and cause columns of smoke to rise, thus making her neighbors believe that, like them, she was baking the Sabbath meals. In time, however, one woman's suspicion was aroused, and she determined to surprise Hanina's wife and discover the truth. But, according to the legend, a miracle prevented exposure. When the woman appeared at Hanina's house and looked into the smoking oven it was full of loaves. In spite of the miracle, Hanina's wife induced him to collect from heaven an advance portion of his future lot. Hanina complied with her request, and, in answer to his prayer, a golden table-leg was miraculously sent him. Husband and wife were happy; but that night the wife had a vision of heaven in which she saw the saints feasting at three-legged tables while her husband's table had only two legs. She awoke full of regret at the importunity which had deprived his table of a leg, and insisted that he pray for the withdrawal of the treasure. This he did, and the golden leg disappeared. Of this miracle the Talmud says: "It was greater than the former, since heaven gives, but never takes".

Another legend relates a miracle in which Hanina was once prevented from partaking of untithed food. During one Sabbath eve, he sat down to his frugal meal, when suddenly the table receded from him. After thinking a while he recollected that he had borrowed some spices from a neighbor and that he had not separated the required tithe (see Ḥaber). He thereupon adjusted the matter, and the table returned to him. The legend also states that Hanina's donkey would not eat untithed food. Thieves had stolen the animal and confined it in their yard, furnishing it with the necessary provender; but the donkey would neither eat nor drink. As this continued for several days, the thieves concluded to free the animal, lest it starve to death and make their premises foul smelling. On its release it went straight home, none the worse for its long fast.

Legend states that Hanina was greatly grieved at not being able, with other pious people, to present something to the Temple. In his sadness he walked out of town, and, seeing a huge rock, he vowed to carry it to Jerusalem as a gift to the Holy City. He smoothed and polished it, and then looked around for help to transport it. Five laborers appeared, and offered to carry the rock to its destined place for one hundred gold pieces. Hanina, who did not possess half that amount, turned away in despair. Soon, however, other laborers appeared and demanded only five "sela'im," but they stipulated that Hanina himself should aid in the transportation. The agreement concluded, they all seized the rock, and in an instant stood before Jerusalem. When Hanina turned to pay the laborers they were nowhere to be found. He repaired to the Sanhedrin to inquire what disposition he should make of the uncollected wages. The Sanhedrin heard his tale and concluded that the laborers were ministering angels, not human laborers, and that Hanina was therefore at liberty to apply the money to his own use. He, however, presented it to the Temple.

Thus, the legend of Hanina's life is filled with a succession of miraculous tales (see Pesahim, 112b; Bava Kamma, 50a). A comparatively late mishnah remarks, "With the death of Hanina ben Dosa wonder-workers (anshe ma'aseh) ceased to exist".

His general character was likewise extolled. A contemporary rabbi, Eleazar of Modi'im, lecturing on Exodus 18:21, cited Hanina ben Dosa and his colleagues as examples of the expression "men of truth". Two centuries later an aggadist, commenting on Isaiah 3:3, said, "By the term 'honorable man' is meant one through whose merits Heaven respects [is favorable to] his generation; such a one was Hanina ben Dosa". Nor was Hanina's wife soon forgotten; long after her death, legend relates, a party of seafarers espied a work-basket studded with diamonds and pearls. A diver attempted to seize it, but was deterred by a bat kol which said that the precious basket was designed for the wife of Hanina ben Dosa, who would eventually fill it with tekhelet wool for the saints of the future.

Ḥanina never permitted anything to distract him from praying. Once, while praying, a lizard (or snake) bit him, but he did not interrupt his prayers. To his disciples' anxious inquiries he answered that he had been so preoccupied in prayer as to not even feel the bite. When the people found the reptile, dead, they exclaimed, "Woe to the man whom a lizard bites, and woe to the lizard that bites R. Ḥanina b. Dosa!" His wonderful escape is accounted for by the assertion that the result of a lizard's bite depends upon which reaches water first, the man or the lizard; if the former, the latter dies; if the latter, the former dies. In Ḥanina's case a spring miraculously opened under his very feet. The Babylonian Talmud has a different version of this miracle, not taking place during prayer.

== Bibliography ==
- Heilprin, Seder ha-Dorot, ii.
