= Asmodeus =

King of demons from the Book of Tobit

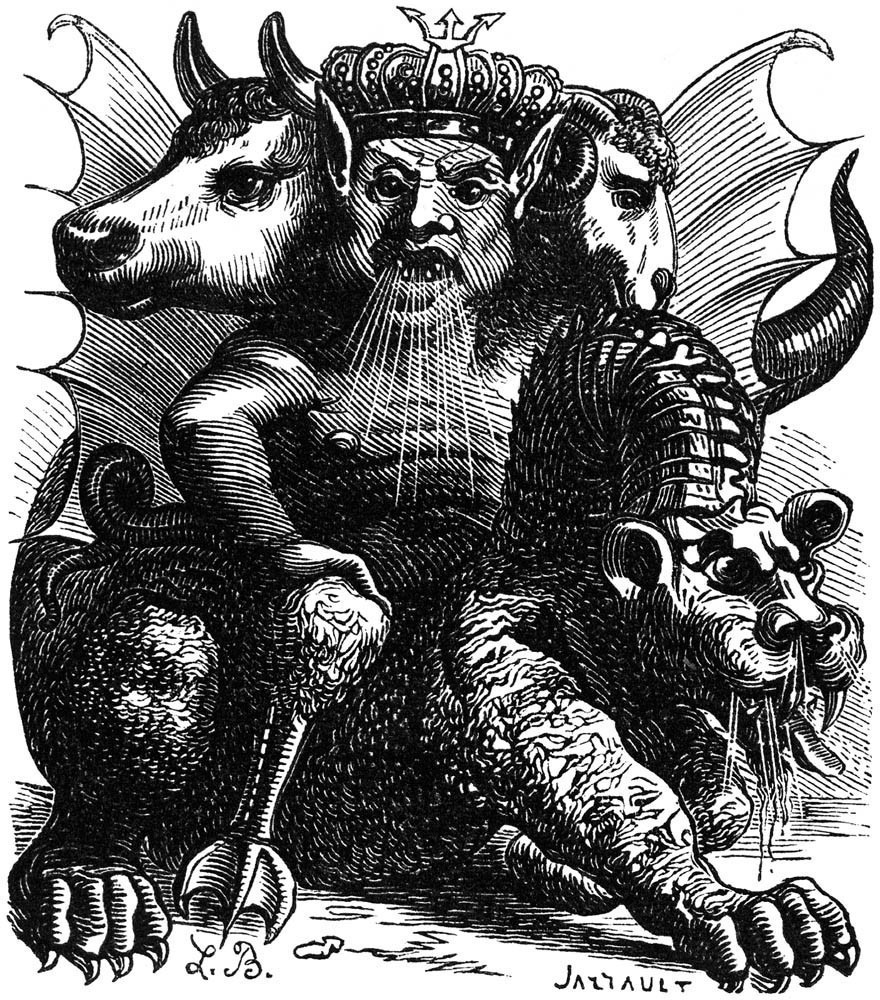
Asmodeus as depicted in Collin de Plancy's Dictionnaire Infernal

Asmodeus (/ˌæzməˈdiːəs/; Ancient Greek: Ἀσμοδαῖος, Asmodaios) or Ashmedai (/ˈæʃmɪˌdaɪ/; Hebrew: אַשְמְדּאָי, romanized: ʾAšmədāy; Arabic: آشماداي; see below for other variations) is a king of demons in the legends of Solomon and the constructing of Solomon's Temple. He is associated with lust.

He is featured variously in Talmudic stories where he is the king of the shedim. The Quran refers to a "puppet" in the Story of Solomon in Surah Ṣād verses 30–40, which is according to the mufassirūn (authorized exegetes of the Quran) referring to the demon-king Asmodeus (Sakhr).

In Christianity, Asmodeus is mostly known from the deuterocanonical Book of Tobit. He is the primary antagonist and disrupts the marriages of Sarah. Peter Binsfeld classifies Asmodeus as the "demon of lust".

== Etymology ==
The name Asmodai is believed to derive from the Avestan *aēšma-daēva (𐬀𐬉𐬴𐬨𐬀𐬛𐬀𐬉𐬎𐬎𐬀*, *aēṣ̌madaēuua), where aēšma means "wrath", and daēva signifies "demon". While the daēva Aēšma is thus Zoroastrianism's demon of wrath and is also well-attested as such, the compound aēšma-daēva is not attested in scripture. It is nonetheless likely that such a form did exist, and that the Book of Tobit's "Asmodaios" (Ἀσμοδαῖος) and the Talmud's "Ashmedai" (אשמדאי) reflect it. In the Zoroastrian and Middle Persian demonology, there did exist the conjuncted form khashm-dev (خشم + دیو), where both terms are cognates.

The spellings Asmoday, Asmodai, Asmodee (also Asmodée), Osmodeus, and Osmodai have also been used. The name is alternatively spelled in the bastardized forms (based on the basic consonants אשמדאי, ʾŠMDʾY) Hashmedai (חַשְמְדּאָי, Ḥašməddāy; also Hashmodai, Hasmodai, Khashmodai, Khasmodai), Hammadai (חַמַּדּאָי, Hammaddāy; also Khammadai), Shamdon (שַׁמְדּוֹן, Šamdon), and Shidonai (שִׁדֹנאָי, Šīdōnʾāy). Some traditions have subsequently identified Shamdon as the father of Asmodeus.

The Jewish Encyclopedia of 1906 rejects the otherwise accepted etymological relation between the Persian "Æshma-dæva" and Judaism's "Ashmodai" claiming that the particle "-dæva" could not have become "-dai" and that Æshma-dæva as such—a compound name—never appears in Persian sacred texts.

Still, the encyclopedia proposes that the "Asmodeus" from the Apocrypha and the Testament of Solomon are not only related somewhat to Aeshma but have similar behaviour, appearance and roles, to conclude in another article under the entry "Aeshma", in the paragraph "Influence of Persian Beliefs on Judaism", that Persian Zoroastrian beliefs could have heavily influenced Judaism's theology on the long term, bearing in mind that in some texts there are crucial conceptual differences while in others there seems to be a great deal of similarity, proposing a pattern of influence over folk beliefs that would extend further to the mythology itself.

However, the Jewish Encyclopedia asserts that although 'Æshma does not occur in the Avesta in conjunction with dæva, it is probable that a fuller form, such as Æshmo-dæus, has existed, since it is paralleled by the later Pahlavi-form "Khashm-dev"'. Furthermore, it is stated that Asmodeus or Ashmedai "embodies an expression of the influence that the Persian religion or Persian popular beliefs have exercised" on Judaism.

== Deuterocanonical sources and Pseudepigrapha ==
=== Book of Tobit ===
The Asmodeus of the Book of Tobit is hostile to Sarah, Raguel's daughter, and slays seven successive husbands on their wedding nights, impeding the sexual consummation of the marriages. However, in Tobit 6:15, Tobias explicitly states that Asmodeus is also in love with Sarah and does not harm her. In the New Jerusalem Bible translation, he is described as "the worst of demons". When the young Tobias is about to marry her, Asmodeus proposes the same fate for him, but Tobias is enabled, through the counsels of his attendant angel Raphael, to render him innocuous. By placing a fish's heart and liver on red-hot cinders, Tobias produces a smoky vapour that causes the demon to flee to Egypt, where Raphael binds him. According to some translations, Asmodeus is strangled.

Perhaps Asmodeus punishes the suitors for their carnal desire, since Tobias prays to be free from such desire and is kept safe. Asmodeus is also described as an evil spirit in general.

The fragments of the Book of Tobit found in the Dead Sea Scrolls do not mention the name Asmodeus, and refer to him instead as a demon (4Q197-198).

=== Testament of Solomon ===
In the Testament of Solomon, a 1st–3rd century text, the king invokes Asmodeus to aid in the construction of the Temple. The demon appears and predicts Solomon's kingdom will one day be divided (Testament of Solomon, verse 21–25). When Solomon interrogates Asmodeus further, the king learns that Asmodeus is thwarted by the angel Raphael, as well as by sheatfish found in the rivers of Assyria. Asmodeus claims that he was born of a human mother and an angel father. He also begs Solomon not to condemn him to water, but Solomon instead assigns him to water-carrying duties.

== Judaism ==
=== Incantation bowls ===
Aramaic incantation bowls feature Asmodeus, the king of demons, sometimes amongst Agrat bat Mahalath, the liliths and Elisur Bagdana. He's mentioned in divorce bowls (26, 48, 49, 59), bowls of the Signet-Ring of Solomon (102-104), and has his own category titled The Seals of Ashmedai (81-86).

Additional bowls that include Asmodeus are 3041+3070, VA.2182 and M145.

=== Babylonian Talmud ===
==== Gittin ====
The figure of Ashmedai in the Talmud is less malign in character than the Asmodeus of Tobit. In the former, he appears repeatedly in the light of a good-natured and humorous fellow. But besides that, there is one feature in which he parallels Asmodeus, in as much as his desires turn upon Bathsheba and later Solomon's wives. The same Talmudic legend has King Solomon tricking Asmodeus into collaborating in the construction of Solomon's Temple (see: The Story of King Solomon and Ashmedai), and Asmodeus throwing King Solomon over 400 leagues away from the capital by putting one wing on the ground and the other stretched skyward. He then changed places for some years with King Solomon. When King Solomon returned, Asmodeus fled from his wrath.

Although Ashmedai fled when Solomon returned, the Gemara states that Solomon continued to fear him a great deal. It connects Solomon's fear of Ashmedai to Song of Songs 3:7–8, which describes sixty armed warriors guarding Solomon's bed at night (Gittin 68b).

The Gemara also records a disagreement between Rav and Shmuel over whether Solomon fully regained his kingship after Ashmedai had usurped his throne. According to the interpretation cited in note 46 of the Schottenstein Edition of Tractate Gittin, Solomon remained king until his death, but never regained his former dominion over supernatural beings.

Similar legends can be found in Islamic lore. Asmodeus is referred to as Sakhr (Arabic: صخر the Rock or the Stony One), because Solomon banished him into a rock, after he takes his kingdom back from him. He is considered to be a king of the divs or ifrits.

==== Pesachim ====
A minor reference in Pesachim 110a describes Asmodeus as the king of demons, not a harmful spirit, appointed over all who perform actions in pairs.

=== Other rabbinic literature ===
The Midrashic sources, like Bamidbar Rabbah and Tehillim, and the Aramaic Targum to Ecclesiasted 1, repeat and comment on the Talmudic story of Solomon and Asmodeus.

=== Kabbalah ===
==== Treatise on the Left Emanation ====
In the Treatise on the Left Emanation, which describes sitra achra (Aramaic: סטרא אחרא), meaning the "other side" or the "side of evil", Asmodeus is described as a figure living in the third ether of Heaven. He is Samael's subordinate, and married to a younger or alternative form of Lilith (Samael is married to the older Lilith). Asmodeus is still able to inflict pain and destruction, but only on Mondays. A great prince was born in heaven from Lilith the Younger and Asmodeus, called "the sword of (king) Asmodeus". His name is Alefpene'ash, and his face burns like a raging fire, or Gurigur, because he antagonizes the prince of Judah, called Lion-cub of Judah.

==== Zohar ====
The Zohar, a major Kabbalistic text, often references a Book of Sorcery of Ashmedai, that was taught to King Solomon. According to Terumah 6:36, in order to remove or subdue an impure spirit, one must pay the full price for the act, whatever is demanded of him, for the spirit is always available for free and settles upon people.

Vayikra quotes the book of Asmodeus, that was taught to king Solomon, when referring to conception, as "any grafting that does not take root within [thirty] days (of conception) will never take root". The husband should also pour clear water around his bed for total protection. According to Tazri'a, a person who wishes to perform sorcery, should stand by the light of a lamp, or in a place where his own image may be seen (such as the moonlight), utter certain incantations, invite his images to receive the demons, and say that they are willingly prepared for their commands. Since sorcery derives from the left side, of impurity, such a person has left the domain of God, surrenders his image, and pledges to the impure side. In Achrei Mot, after an explanation on how Na'amah bears her children from mortal men who lust after her, it's noted that "happy are the righteous who sanctify themselves with the sanctity of the King", and that king Solomon discovered these matters in the Book of King Asmodeus, where 1450 types of defilements contracted by humans are found.

Balak states that a person who wants to perform secret powerful sorcery, and knows the rock were Balaam fell (from the sky), will find:

some of those snakes formed from the bones of that wicked one. If he kills one of them, with its head he can perform superior sorcery; with its body, other sorcery; with the tail, other sorcery. There are three types of sorcery in every single one.

Pinchas 112 describes Asmodeus and his family as Jewish spirits, who were subdued by the Torah and its names.

According to Zohar Chadash (Bereshit 840), Asmodeus is the son of the demon queen Na'amah.

=== Other Jewish sources ===
Asmodeus makes a single appearance in the Jewish magical text Sepher Raziel, as well as the Sepher haRazim (in the latter of which he's an angel of the second firmament).

According to the school of Shlomo ibn Aderet, Asmodeus is born as the result of a union between Agrat bat Mahlat and King David.

The commentaries by Bahya ben Asher and Ramban on Genesis 4:22, refer to Asmodeus as the son of Na'amah by a demon named Shamdon or Ashmadon.

In later Jewish folklore Asmodeus is sometimes associated with Lilith.

== Grimoire Tradition ==
=== In the Malleus Maleficarum ===
In the Malleus Maleficarum (1486), Asmodeus was considered the demon of lust. Sebastien Michaelis said that his adversary is St. John. Some demonologists of the 16th century assigned a month to a demon and considered November to be the month in which Asmodeus's power was strongest. Other demonologists asserted that his zodiacal sign was Aquarius but only between January 30 and February 8.

He has 72 legions of demons under his command. He is one of the Kings of Hell under Lucifer the emperor. He incites gambling, and is the overseer of all the gambling houses in the court of Hell. Some Catholic theologians compared him with Abaddon. Yet other authors considered Asmodeus a prince of revenge.

=== In the Dictionnaire Infernal ===
The Dictionnaire Infernal (1818) by Collin de Plancy portrays Asmodeus with the breast of a man, a cock leg, serpent tail, three heads — one of a man spitting fire, one of a sheep, and one of a bull), riding a lion with dragon wings and neck — all of these creatures being associated with either lascivity, lust or revenge in some cultures. The Archbishop of Paris approved the portrait.

=== In the Lesser Key of Solomon ===
Seal of Asmodeus in the Ars Goetia

Asmodeus appears as the king 'Asmoday' in the Ars Goetia, where he is said to have a seal in gold and is listed as number thirty-two according to respective rank.

He "is strong, powerful and appears with three heads; the first is like a bull, the second like a man, and the third like a ram or a goat; the tail of a serpent, and from his mouth issue flames of fire." Also, he sits upon an infernal dragon, holds a lance with a banner and, amongst the Legions of Amaymon, Asmoday governs seventy-two legions of inferior spirits.

=== In The Magus ===
Asmodeus is referred to in Book Two, Chapter Eight of The Magus (1801) by Francis Barrett.

== Christianity ==
=== Coptic Christian magic ===
Ancient Christian manuscripts feature Asmodeus (ⲁⲥⲙⲟⲧⲉⲟⲥ) in spells to bring seventy diseases upon a victim, or for good fishing.

=== In Christian thought ===
Asmodeus was named in the Order of Thrones by Gregory the Great.

Asmodeus was cited by the nuns of Loudun in the Loudun possessions of 1634.

Asmodeus' reputation as the personification of lust continued into later writings, as he was known as the "Prince of Lechery" in the 16th-century romance Friar Rush. The French Benedictine Augustin Calmet equated his name with a fine dress. The 1409 Lollard manuscript titled Lanterne of Light associated Asmodeus with the deadly sin of lust. The 16th-century Dutch demonologist Johann Weyer described him as the banker at the baccarat table in hell, and overseer of earthly gambling houses.

== Islam ==
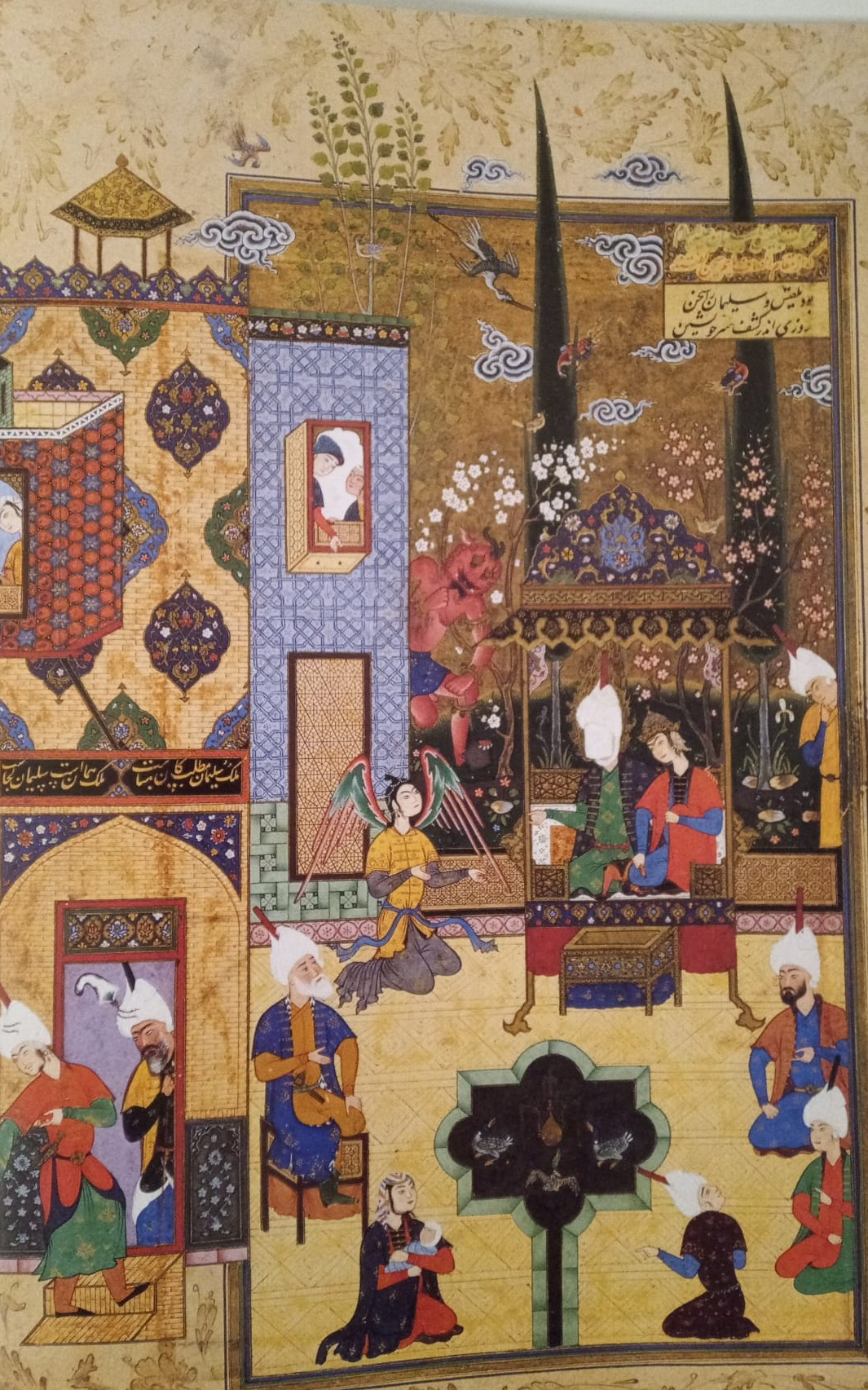
Solomon and the Queen of Sheba informed by an angel about their child, possibly an allusion to Nizami's Tale of the Princess of the Yellow-Gold Pavilion. A red demon enslaved in the garden, presumably Asmodeus, is forced to work.

In Islamic culture, Asmodeus is known as a demon (Arabic: شَيطان, romanized: šayṭān Persian: دیو, romanized: dīv) called Sakhr (rock), probably a reference to his fate being imprisoned inside a box of rock, chained with iron and thrown into the sea. or his association with the desires of the lower world. He features prominently as the antagonist of the prophet Solomon. He is sometimes identified with the ifrit who offered to carry the Throne of Solomon. In the story of Buluqiya, Asmodeus teaches a young Jewish prince about the seven layers of hell.

=== Quran and exegesis ===
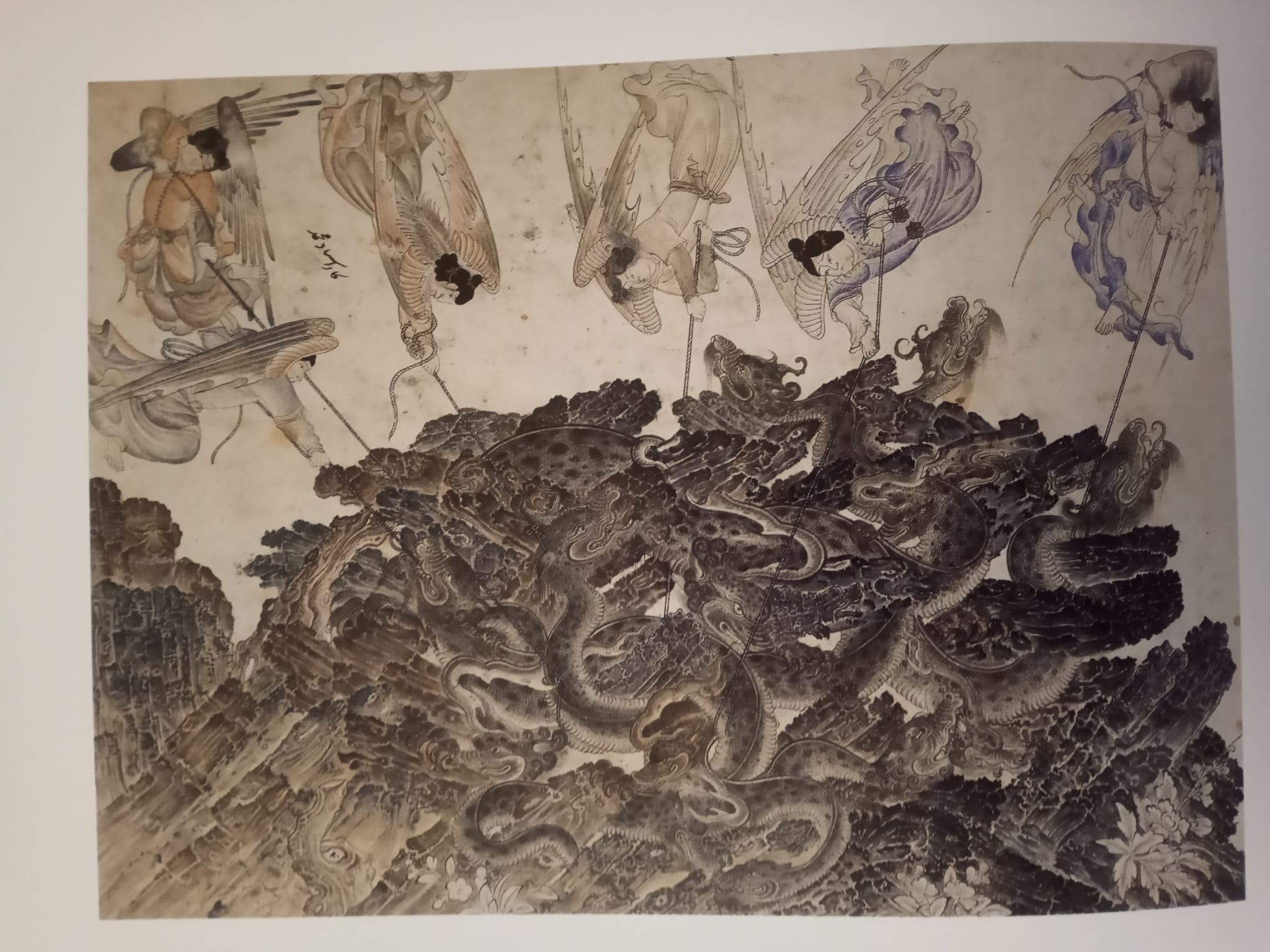
Angels fighting to hold a demonic dragon in chains. On the left side of the picture, the head of Asmodeus lurks from a crag of the demonic manifestation. The image conveys the battle between the demonic passions and the rational intellect in the form of the angels, supposedly happening inside a human's heart. Siyah Qalam (1478)

Islamic exegesis (tafsīr) commentary about Asmodeus are abundant in Medieval Islam. Asmodeus became a central figure in of the Quranic Ṣād verse 38:34: "And indeed, We tested Solomon, placing a ˹deformed˺ body on his throne, then he turned ˹to Allah in repentance˺." Tabari (224–310 AH; 839–923 AD) identifies the body mentioned in the verse as a shaytan in both his Annals of al-Tabari as well as his tafseer.

Abd al-Razzaq Kāshānī comments on the same verse, "The satan who sat thereupon [sovereignty's throne] and took its ring away, represents the elemental earthly nature, ruler over the lower sea of matter, called "Sakhr"('rock') on account of its inclination toward the lowest things and clinging thereto, even as a stone on account of heaviness."

Aziz ad-Din Nasafi depicts Solomon as caliph, a symbol of the ruling intellect, whose task it is to reduce the physical passions to proper obedience, else the forces will capture the mind's seat and turn into an usurping demon. Solomon's ring signifies the imperial command over the forces of nature, while Solomon's lapse into lust and idolatry caused him to lose.

In the Tafsir al-Jalalayn, a Quranic commentary by Jalal al-Din al-Mahalli and Jalal al-Din al-Suyuti, the interpretation of Surah Sad (38:34) addresses a divine trial of the Prophet Solomon involving Sakhr al-Jinn, identified as the "body" (jasad) placed on his throne. The exegesis describes Sakhr, a rebellious jinn, temporarily usurping Solomon's rule for forty days, during which idolatry occurs in his household, challenging his faith. Solomon repents, seeking divine forgiveness and the restoration of his kingdom, which encompasses authority over jinn and natural elements.

=== Hagiographic (Qiṣaṣ) ===
Supplementary materials which usually included in Stories of the Prophets (Qiṣaṣ al-Anbiyāʾ) give various reasons for Solomon's punishment and Asmodeus' consequently temporary victory; sometimes because of acting injustly before a family dispute or hands the ring to a demon in exchange for knowledge, while most sources (such as Tabari, ʿUmāra ibn Wathīma, Abu Ishaq al-Tha'labi, ibn Asakir, ibn al-Athir) invoke the idea that one of his wives committed idolatry.

When Asmodeus put the ring on his finger, he turned into the shape of Solomon and sat on his throne, ruling in wickedness, while the real Solomon emerged from his bath and not recognized by anyone in the palace, thus cast into the streets to wander as a beggar. Finally Solomon found work at a harbor, gutting fish. After 40 days the false Solomon's evil ways aroused suspicion and the royal minister Asaph recites some holy verses in the presence of the demon king, who screamed in rage, unable to bear the recitation, and tore off the ring. The ring then fell into a river and was swallowed by a fish. The fish eventually arrived at the table of the real Solomon who slipped the ring back on and was immediately surrounded by loyal jinn who carried him to his throne, where he and his army of men, jinn, birds, and beasts battle Asmodeus and locked him in a stone after his defeat.

Attar of Nishapur elucidates a similar allegory: one must behave like a triumphant 'Solomon' and chain the demons of the nafs or lower self, locking the demon-prince into a 'rock', before the rūḥ (soul) can make the first steps to the Divine.

=== Folk literature ===
The idea of "Genie in a bottle" probably roots in the Islamic legend about the demon Asmodeus. In a story of Thousand and One Nights, the "Tale of the City of Brass" refers to Asmodeus' fate after his failure against the Prophet. According to this story, travelers discover the demon locked in a stone in the middle of the desert. The story goes as follows according to Sir Richard Burton:

Then they came upon a pillar of black stone like a furnace chimney wherein was one sunken up to his armpits. He had two great wings and four arms, two of them like the arms of the sons of Adam and other two as they were lions' paws, with claws of iron, and he was black and tall and frightful of aspect, with hair like horses' tails and eyes like blazing coals, slit upright in his face.

In the essay on the Arabic "Tale of the City of Brass", Andras Hamori relied only on incomplete versions of the story without mentioning the name of the demon.

In the story of Sakhr and Buluqiya, a young Jewish prince searching for the final Prophet (Muhammad), Sakhr is said to have reached immortality by drinking from the Well of Immortality. When Buluqiya arrives in an island during his search for Muhammad, he is greeted by two snakes as big as camels and palm trees, glorifying the name of God and Muhammad. They explain that they are tasked with punishing the residents of hell. Later on a different island, he meets Asmodeus the king of demons, who explains the seven layers (ṭabaqāt) and the punisher angels (Zabaniyah) who sire hell's snakes and scorpions by self-copulation.

== Later depictions ==
In 1641, the Spanish playwright and novelist Luis Velez de Guevara published the satirical novel El diablo cojuelo, where Asmodeus is represented as a mischievous demon endowed with a playful and satirical genius. The plot presents a rascal student that hides in an astrologer's mansard. He frees a devil from a bottle. As an acknowledgement the devil shows him the apartments of Madrid and the tricks, miseries and mischiefs of their inhabitants.

The French novelist Alain-René Lesage adapted the Spanish source in his 1707 novel le Diable boiteux, where he likened him to Cupid. In the book, he is rescued from an enchanted glass bottle by a Spanish student Don Cleophas Leandro Zambullo. Grateful, he joins with the young man on a series of adventures before being recaptured. Asmodeus is portrayed in a sympathetic light as good-natured, and a canny satirist and critic of human society. In another episode Asmodeus takes Don Cleophas for a night flight, and removes the roofs from the houses of a village to show him the secrets of what passes in private lives. Following Lesage's work, he was depicted in a number of novels and periodicals, mainly in France but also London and New York.

Asmodeus was widely depicted as having a handsome visage, good manners and an engaging nature; however, he was portrayed as walking with a limp and one leg was either clawed or that of a rooster. He walks aided by two walking sticks in Lesage's work, and this gave rise to the English title The Devil on Two Sticks (also later translated The Limping Devil and The Lame Devil). Lesage attributes his lameness to falling from the sky after fighting with another devil.

On 18 February 1865, author Evert A. Duyckinck sent President Abraham Lincoln a letter, apparently mailed from Quincy. Duyckinck signed the letter "Asmodeus", with his initials below his pseudonym. His letter enclosed a newspaper clipping about an inappropriate joke allegedly told by Lincoln at the Hampton Roads Peace Conference. The purpose of Duyckinck's letter was to advise Lincoln of "an important omission" about the history of the conference. He advised that the newspaper clipping be added to the "Archives of the Nation".

== See also ==
- Aeshma
- Agrat bat Mahlat
- Archdemon
- Belial
- Lilith
- Naamah (demon)
- Samael
- Satan
- Solomon
- Serpents in the Bible
