= Treatise on the Left Emanation =

The Treatise on the Left Emanation (Hebrew: מאמר על האצילות השמאלית, romanized: Ma'amar al ha-Atzilut haSimalit) is a Kabbalistic text by Rabbi Isaac ben Jacob ha-Cohen, who with his brother Jacob traveled in Spain and Provence in the period of 1260–1280.

Scholars credit this text with being the first to present a "comprehensive concept of evil", bearing a striking resemblance to that found in Gnosticism. It is also the first to treat Samael and Lilith as a couple, likely inspiring later such depictions in the Zohar.

Isaac may be the pseudepigraphic author of other texts including the Pseudo-R. Eleazar Responsum, and the Pseudo-R. Yehushiel Responsa.

== Publication and translation ==
Gershom Scholem published the Hebrew text in "Kabbalot R. Yaakov veR. Yitzhak" (1927). Mada'e hayahadut. Vol. 2. f. 82r ff.

- Professor Ronald C. Kiener, published an incomplete translation in The Early Kabbalah, New York: Paulist Press, 1986.
- A complete translation from Hebrew to English has been published in 2023.

== See also ==
- Lilith
- Sitra Achra
- Moses de Leon
- Zohar
