= Senoy, Sansenoy and Semangelof =

Group of angels in Jewish tradition

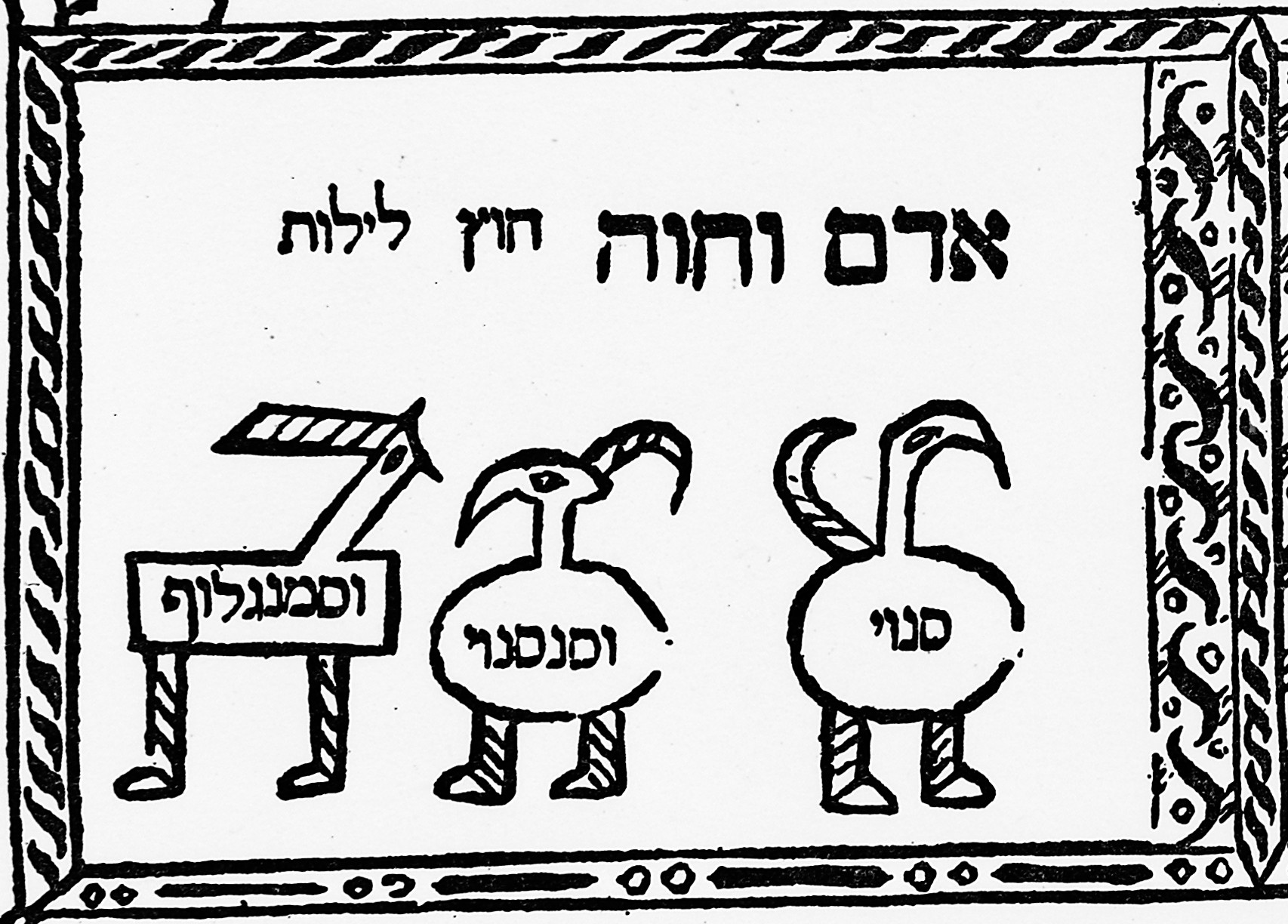
A depiction of the angels Senoy, Sansenoy and Semangelof, with their names inscribed in them, from the left side of a medieval Jewish amulet containing a spell to protect a woman giving birth and her child from Lilith.

Senoy (Senoi, Senoy), Sansenoy (Sansenoi, Sansenoy, Sensenoy) and Semangelof are three angels who in Jewish folklore, were assigned to protect women during childbirth and the postpartum period, as well as newborn children from the attacks of the night demon Lilith and similar malevolent figures. Their names and likeness were used on objects such as special paper or silver amulets, incantation bowls, and doors to birthing rooms to repel such demons.

== Alphabet of Sirach ==
According to Jewish tradition (preserved in the 10th century text Alphabet of Sirach), the angels Senoy, Sansenoy and Semangelof were sent by Yahweh on a mission to bring Lilith, Adam's first wife, back to Eden. Lilith abandoned Eden and her husband after he refused to let her play an active role during sexual intercourse. Lilith found a new home among the wastelands and wilderness outside the garden, where she entered into relationships with fallen angels, giving birth to thousands of demons called lilim.

Adam desired her return, so Yahweh sent three angels named Senoy, Sansenoy and Semangelof, who threatened to Lilith that if she did not return, a hundred of her children would die every day. Lilith refused to return, but announced that she would avenge the deaths of her children by killing infants and women who gave birth. However, she agreed to spare all mothers and infants descended from Adam and his second wife, Eve, during childbirth and the postpartum period as long as they wore an amulet with the images or names of these three angels on it. According to tradition, their very names served as a supernatural safeguard against Lilith's harmful intentions toward newborns and their mothers as a result.

== History and customs ==
The beginnings of the tradition associated with Lilith and the three angels date back to the first centuries of the Common Era: the names of the angels Senoy, Sansenoy and Semangelof are mentioned, for example, in the spells against Lilith written in Aramaic on clay incantation bowls from Nippur dated to around 600 AD. One notable example preserved in the National Library of Israel features similar-sounding protective entities named Soney, Sosoney and Senigly, who shield a character named Smamit from a malevolent demon called Sideros. These angels gained more widespread recognition in Jewish tradition through the 10th century text known as the "Alphabet of Sirah," which elaborates their role in the narrative of Adam, Lilith, and Eve. While earlier first-century Hebrew texts mention entities with similar names, the Alphabet of Sirah established their canonical function as protective forces against demonic harm to mothers and children.

Protective amulets intended to protect mothers and infants during and following childbirth typically feature both the angels' names and visual representations of their figures, often depicting them as bird-like figures. The material composition of these amulets varied, from handwritten parchment versions common in Middle Eastern Jewish communities to later printed paper versions that became widespread after the development of printing technology. The earliest printed Jewish amulet, produced in Amsterdam around 1700, incorporates these protective entities alongside illustrations of Adam and Eve, excluding Lilith. Another way to protect a newborn child from Lilith and similar demons, used in many Jewish communities, was to write the names of Senoy, Sansenoy and Semangelof on the door of the birthing room. Amulets featuring Senoy, Sansenoy and Semangelof were still being produced in Middle Eastern Jewish communities in the early to mid-20th century, maintaining essentially the same historic protective function and design elements.

When pronounced together, Senoy, Sansenoy and Semangelof create a distinctive sound pattern (sen-san-sen-sem) that Jewish scholars describe as having an onomatopoeic, threatening quality reminiscent of natural warning sounds like snake hisses or crackling fire. This sonic aspect is considered by scholars an integral part of their protective function, creating an auditory barrier that supposedly deters Lilith and other harmful entities from approaching mothers and newborns.

=== In other traditions ===
The angels' names appeared in adapted forms within Christian protective traditions. The names evolved into Saint Sisoe (from Senoy), Sisynios (from Sansenoy), and Synidores (from Semangelof) in various Christian protective charms.

== See also ==
- Zahreil
