= Naftali Hertz ben Yaakov Elchanan =

German rabbi (17th century)

Naftali Hertz ben Yaakov Elchanan (Bacharach) (17th century) was a German rabbi, born in Frankfurt, author of the controversial work Emeq HaMelekh (Valley of the King, 1648, Amsterdam) on the subject of the Lurianic Kabbalah.

== Works ==
His most well-known work, Emeq HaMelekh, was based mainly on Israel Sarug's Limmudei Azilut (published 1897), incorporating large portions of that text. It seems very likely that Bacharach borrowed heavily from many sources (including Sarug, Joseph Solomon Delmedigo, and Shabbetai Horowitz) without acknowledging the debt (Scholem 1974). The book had a major impact on later kabbalah as it was regarded among many, including the Chabad Hasidim and the followers of the Vilna Gaon, as an authoritative statement of Luria's kabbala. Its influence is also evident in Ramchal's system. The book indicates that, prior to the conquest of Jerusalem and the Babylonian captivity, the prophet Jeremiah hid the treasures of Solomon's Temple, with the assistance of five others.

Although Emeq HaMelekh contained approbations from well-respected scholars, it also met with substantial disapproval from contemporary kabbalists such as Hayyim ben Abraham ha-Kohen and Berechiah Berak, and later from Chaim Joseph David Azulai and Moses Hagiz. Ha-Kohen accuses Bacharach of falsely attributing his own ideas to Luria.

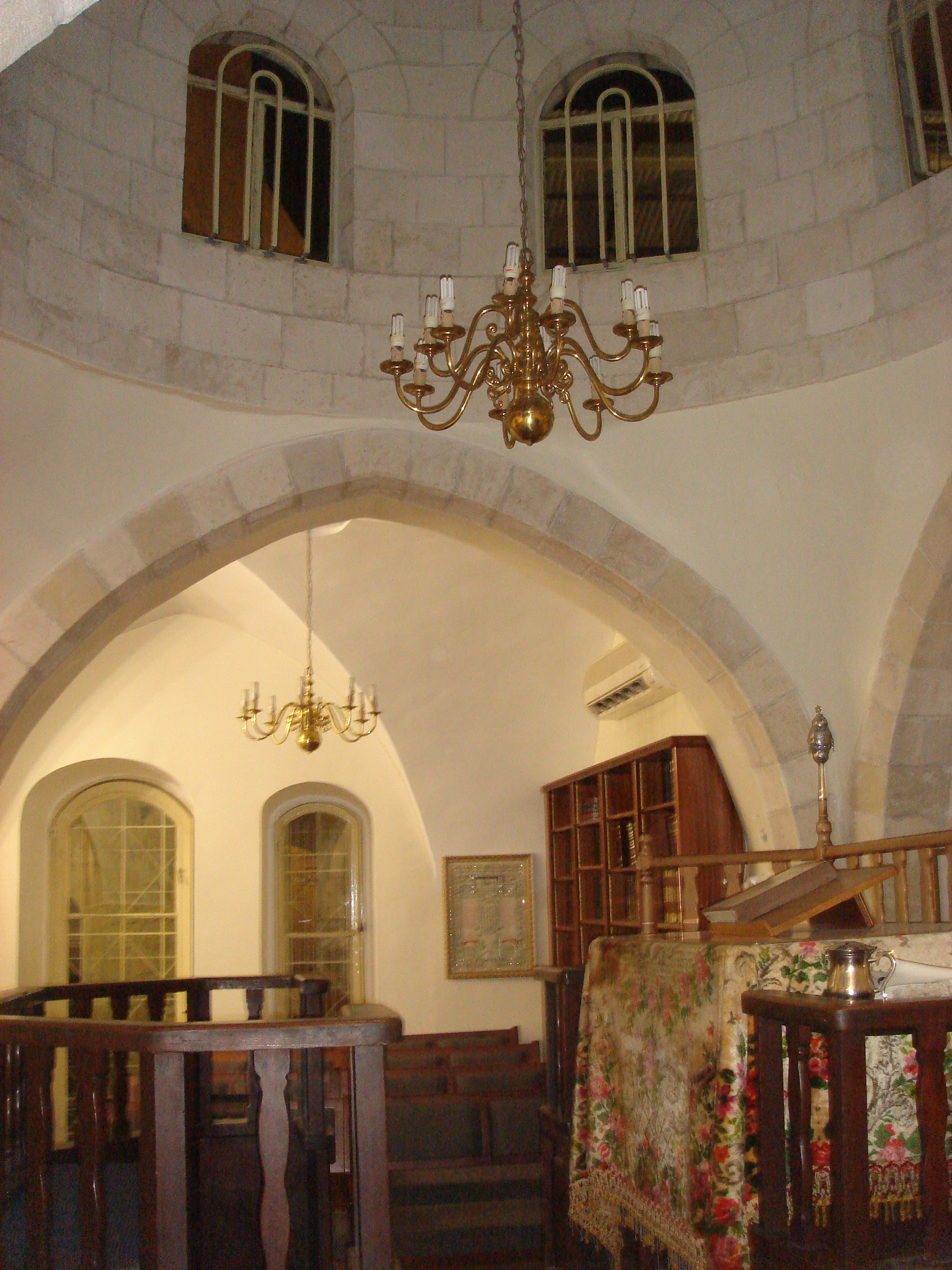
The historic Avraham Avinu synagogue in Hebron

The book Emeq HaMelekh is the source for the famous story about the historic Avraham Avinu synagogue in Hebron. According to the introduction, a stranger appeared on the evening of Yom Kippur to serve as the 10th man of the minyan and thus complete the required number of people for a prayer service. After Yom Kippur, the rest of the congregation couldn't find him. That night, the hazzan of the synagogue dreamed that the man was speaking to him and told him that he was Avraham Avinu, the Patriarch of the Jewish people who is buried nearby in the Cave of Machpela. The full text of this story and the original cover of the book today hang on a plaque in the Avraham Avinu synagogue.

The second part of this work, under the title Gan HaMelekh, is a commentary on passages of the Zohar. It is still in manuscript.

=== Translations ===
The first two "Gates" of Sefer Emeq HaMelekh were translated into English.
