= Pardes Rimonim =

Book dealing with the Kabbalah

Pardes Rimonim (meaning "Orchard of Pomegranates," with the word pardes having the double meaning of kabbalistic "exegesis") is a primary text of Kabbalah composed in 1548 by the Jewish mystic Moses ben Jacob Cordovero in Safed, Galilee.

Page from a 1632 edition of Pardes Rimonim printed in Kraków

16th-century Safed saw the theoretical systemisation of previous Kabbalistic theological views. Pardes Rimonim was the first comprehensive exposition of Medieval Kabbalah, though the subsequent 16th-century Safed mythological scheme of Isaac Luria superseded its rationally influenced scheme.

Cordovero indicates in his introduction that the work is based upon notes he took during his study of the Zohar, the foundational work of the Kabbalah. He notes that he composed the Pardes Rimonim "not to become lost and confused in its [the Zohar] depths."

The work is an encyclopedic summary of the Kabbalah, including an effort to "elucidate all the tenets of the Kabbala, such as the doctrines of the sefirot, emanation, the divine names, the import and significance of the alphabet, etc." The Pardes Rimonim was one of the most widely read and influential Kabbalistic works. It was considered a basis of the Kabbalistic outlook until the works of Isaac Luria ultimately overshadowed it.

The Pardes Rimmonim comprised 32 gates or sections, subdivided into chapters. It was first published in Kraków in 1591. A précis of it was published under the title Asis Rimmonim, by Samuel Gallico; and Menahem Azariah da Fano, Mordecai Prszybram, and Isaiah Horowitz wrote subsequent commentaries on some parts of it. The original work was partly translated into Latin by Bartolocci, by Joseph Ciantes (in De Sanctissima Trinitate Contra Judæos, Rome, 1664), by Athanasius Kircher (Rome, 1652–54), and by Christian Knorr von Rosenroth (in Kabbala Denudata, Sulzbach, 1677).

== English editions ==
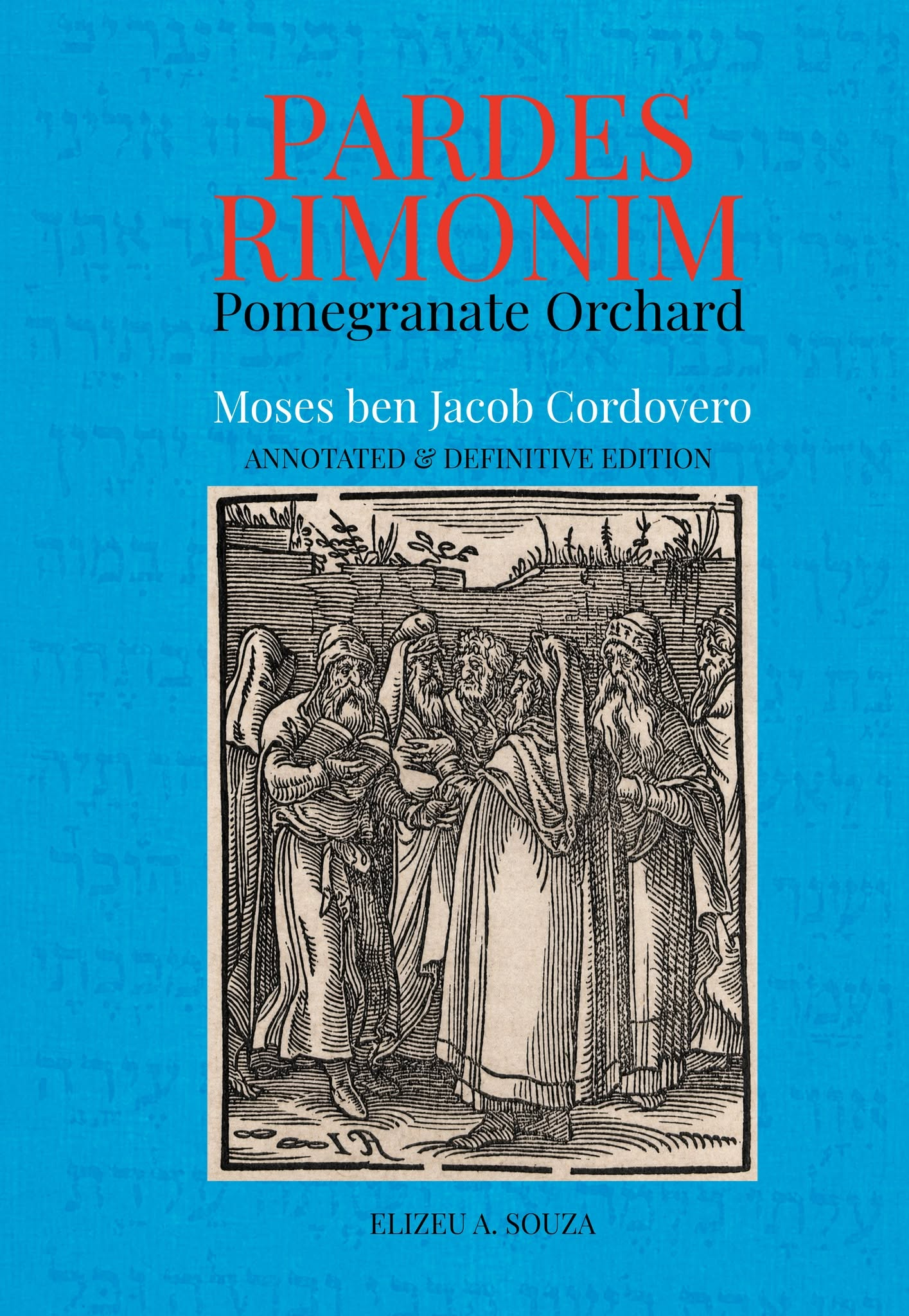
Cover of the 2026 annotated English edition of Pardes Rimonim.

In 2026, an annotated English edition titled Pardes Rimonim - Annotated - Definitive Edition was published by Meta Brasil.

== See also ==
- Primary texts of Kabbalah
- Meir ben Ezekiel ibn Gabbai
