= Bagdana (Judaism) =

Bagdana is a demon in Jewish magical texts from early medieval Mesopotamia. The name is found on incantation bowls, and Aramaic incantation texts from Nippur.
