= Bahya ben Asher =

Rabbi and scholar of Judaism

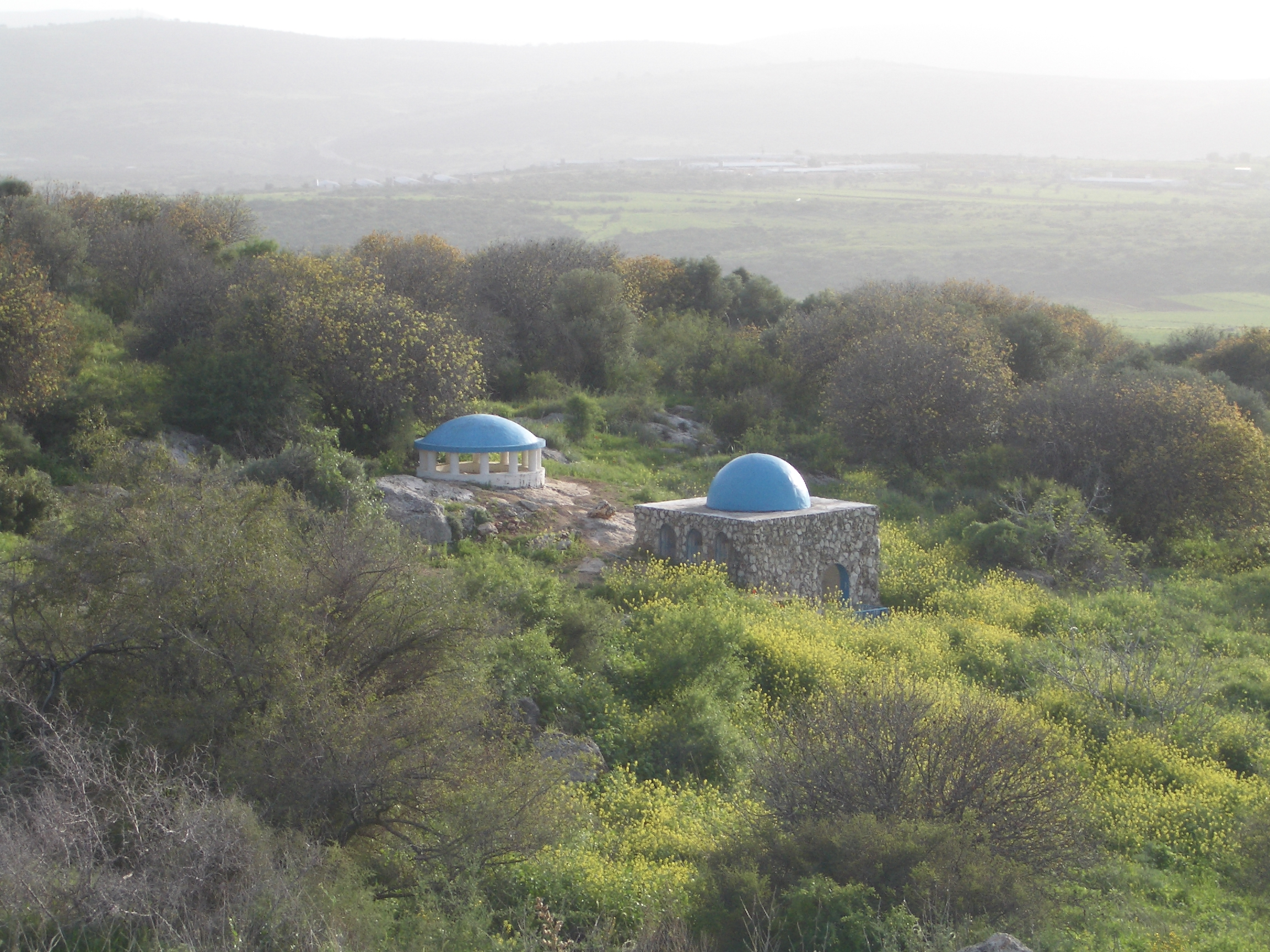
Tsiyun of Rabbeinu Behayé and his talmidim, `Hokok in the Galil, Israel

Bahya ben Asher ibn Halawa (בחיי בן אשר אבן חלואה, 1255–1340) was a rabbi and scholar of Judaism, best known as a commentator on the Hebrew Bible. He is one of two scholars now referred to as Rabbeinu Behaye, the other being philosopher Bahya ibn Paquda.

== Biography ==
Bahya was a pupil of Rabbi Shlomo ibn Aderet (the Rashba). Unlike the latter, Bahya did not publish a Talmud commentary; he is, however, considered by Jewish scholars to be one of the most distinguished of the biblical exegetes of Spain. He "discharged with zeal" the duties of a darshan (Hebrew for "expounder") in his native city of Zaragoza, sharing this position with several others. He is buried in Kadarim, Israel, a few minutes walking distance from the prophet Habakkuk.

== Works ==
Bahya's principal work is his commentary on the Torah (the five books of Moses), but he is also known for others, especially Kad ha-Kemah.

=== Torah commentary ===
The commentary on the Torah - "מדרש רבינו בחיי על התורה " - enjoyed much favor, as attested to by the numerous supercommentaries published on it (not less than ten are enumerated by Bernstein (Monatsschrift xviii. 194-196)). Owing to the large space devoted to the Kabbalah, the work was also particularly valuable to Kabbalists.

It considered to "derive a particular charm" from its form: Each parashah, or weekly lesson, is prefaced by an introduction preparing the reader for the fundamental ideas to be discussed; and this introduction bears a motto in the form of some verse selected from the Book of Mishlei (Proverbs). Furthermore, by the questions that are frequently raised the reader is compelled to take part in the author's mental processes; the danger of monotony being also thereby removed.

In preparing his commentary "he thoroughly investigated" the works of former biblical exegetes, using all the methods employed by them in his interpretations; although Rabbi Bahya also availed himself of non-Jewish sources. In his biblical exegesis, Bahya took as his model Rabbi Moses ben Nahman (Nachmanides) or Ramban, the teacher of Rabbi Shlomo ibn Aderet, who was the first major commentator to make extensive use of the Kabbalah as a means of interpreting the Torah. He enumerates the following four methods, all of which in his opinion are indispensable to the exegete:

1. The peshat, the "plain" meaning of the text in its own right.
2. The midrash or the aggadic exegesis.
3. Logical analysis and philosophical exegesis. His aim is to demonstrate that philosophical truths are already embodied in the Bible, which as a work of God transcends all the wisdom of man. He therefore recognizes the results of philosophical thought only insofar as they do not conflict with Jewish tradition.
4. The method of the Kabbalah, termed by him "the path of light," which the truth-seeking soul must travel. It is by means of this method, Bahya believes, that the deep mysteries hidden in the Bible may be revealed. Generally speaking, Rabbi Bahya does not reveal any of his Kabbalistic sources, other than generally referring to Sefer HaBahir and the works of Nachmanides. He only mentions the Zohar twice.

The commentary was first printed at Naples in 1492; Later editions of the commentary appeared at Pesaro, 1507, 1514, and 1517; Constantinople, 1517; Rimini, 1524; Venice, 1544, 1546, 1559, 1566, and later.

=== Other works ===
Bahya's next most famous work is his Kad ha-Kemah ( כד הקמח, "The Flour-Jar"; Constantinople, 1515.) It consists of sixty chapters, alphabetically arranged, containing discourses and dissertations on the requirements of religion and morality, as well as Jewish ritual practices. Kad ha-Kemah is both a work of musar (ethics) and philosophy: It is regarded as a work of ethics, in that its purpose is to promote a moral life; it is a work of philosophy in that Rabbeinu Bahya endeavors to give his ethical teachings a philosophical aspect. In this work Bahya discusses the following subjects: belief and faith in God; the divine attributes and the nature of providence; the duty of loving God, and of walking before God in simplicity and humility of heart; the fear of God; Jewish prayer; benevolence, and the love of mankind; peace; the administration of justice, and the sacredness of the oath; the duty of respecting the property and honor of one's fellow man; the Jewish holidays, and halakha ("Jewish law".)

Another work of Bahya's is the Shulkhan Shel Arba ("Table of Four"). It consists of four chapters, the first three of which contain religious rules of conduct regarding the various meals, while the fourth chapter treats of the banquet of the righteous in the world to come. It has also been published frequently, and the first Mantua edition of 1514 was erroneously ascribed to Nachmanides.

A work might have been written by Rabbi Bahye under the title of Hoshen ha-Mishpat (Breastplate of Judgment). Reference to this work is made only once by him, and it is unknown if this work was actually written or not.

=== Works incorrectly attributed to him ===
A number of works whose author is simply "Bahya", or whose authors are unknown, have been attributed to Rabbi Bahye ben Asher. Many modern day authorities on Rabbi Bahya's writings have shown that many of these attributions are spurious.

- Ha-Emunah ve-ha-Bittahon (Korets, 1785)
- Ma'arekhet ha-Elohut (Mantua, 1558)
- Ma'amar ha-Sekhel (Cremona, 1557)

One book ostensibly written by Bahya, edited by M. Homburg under the title of Soba Semakhot ("Fulness of Joy"), as being a commentary on the Book of Job, is actually a compilation made by a later editor from two of Bahye's actual works, Kad ha-Kemah (Constantinople, 1515) and Shulhan shel Arba (Mantua, 1514).
