= Tur Shimon =

Archaeological site in Israel

- Khirbet Sammunieh
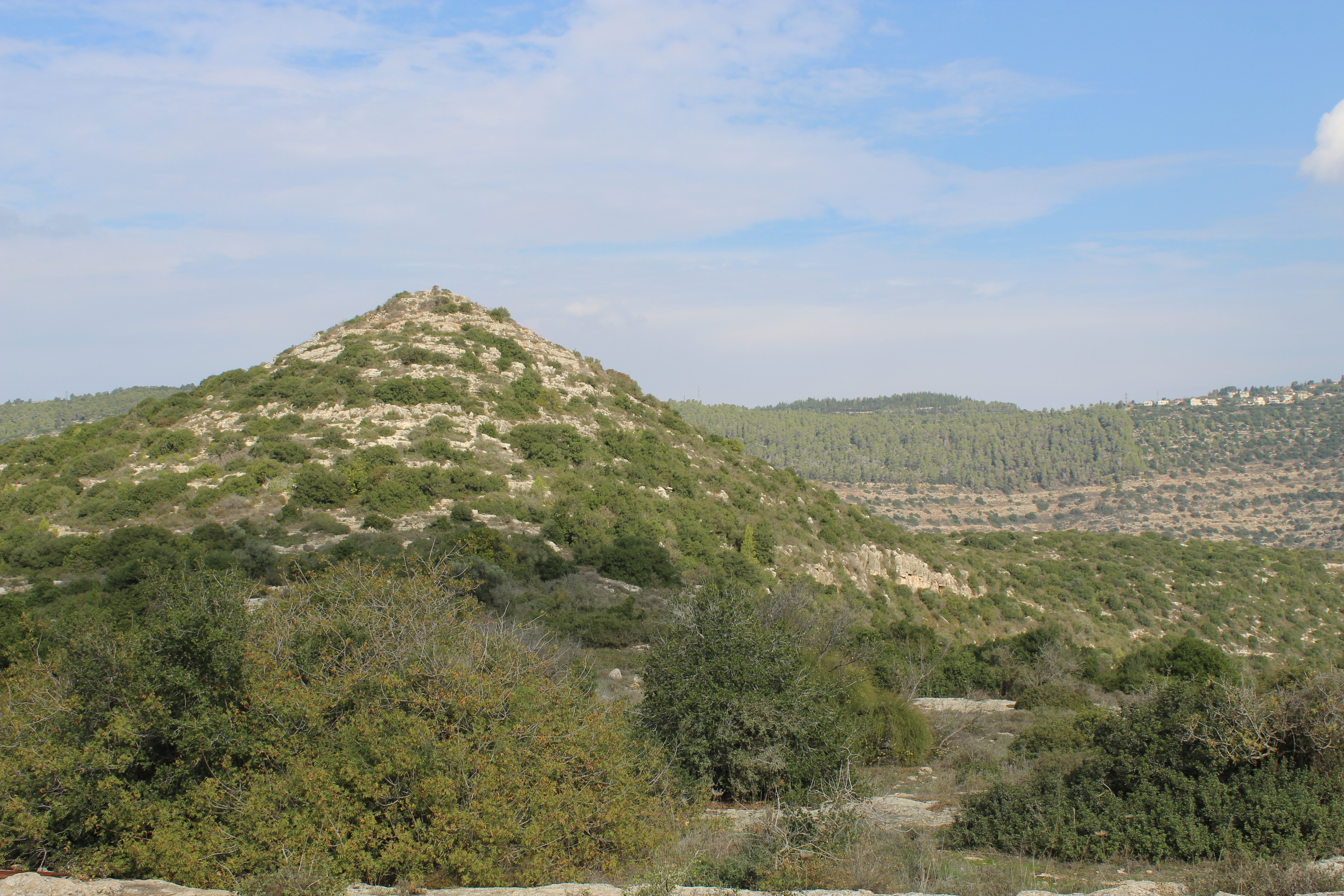
- Tur Shimon in Nahal Sorek
- Interactive map of Tur Shimon
- Nearest city: Nes Harim
- Coordinates: 31°45′19.07″N 35°03′40.3″E
- Established: Hellenistic period

Tur Shimon (Hebrew: טור שמעון) or Horvat Tura, the Hebraized form of Khirbet et-Tantura ("Ruin of the Point"), so-called after the shape of the hill, is an archaeological site in Nahal Sorek, Israel. The mountain is built like a natural fortress. Below it to its southeast, in close proximity, is the ruin Khirbet Deir esh-Sheikh.

== Geography ==
Tur Shimon sits 595 metres (1,952 ft) above sea level, conspicuous among the mountains as it rises up from the riverbed of the Nahal Sorek Nature Reserve in the form of a conical shaped mountain. The hilltop ruin is covered with brushwood and wild growth, ashlars, a partially standing wall of field stones, razed structures, and large rock-cut cisterns. The entire grounds are strewn with fragments of ancient pottery. Near the summit are six large water reservoirs, hewn in bedrock and plastered. On the northeastern slope of the ruin is a tunnel measuring c. 80 meters long, ending in a rock-hewn pit with niches resembling a columbarium (dovecote). On the southwest slope of the mountain are seen other traces of the town's material culture: a columbarium carved into the rock, a lime pit for burning limestone, a cistern and a wine press.

== History ==
=== Antiquity ===
Ancient Tur Shimon, mentioned twice in classical Hebrew literature (Jerusalem Talmud, Ta'anit 4:5 and Midrash Rabba, Aicha Rabba 2:5.), has been tentatively identified with Khirbet Sammunieh based on a comparison of the name Tur Shimon with two given Arabic names. The fertility of the region is highlighted in rabbinic lore, which states that the inhabitants of Tur Shimon prepared 300 sealed jars of summer produce every week.

In the summer, Tur Shimon would put out three-hundred jars [of produce] each Friday, and why was it destroyed? Some say because of lechery, but others say because they would play with a ball [on the Sabbath day].

=== Ottoman era ===
Lt. Conder, describing the terrain in July 1881, wrote: "Riding down the great gorge which, under various names, runs down from near Gibeon to Beth Shemesh, we gradually ascended the southern slopes in the vicinity of the little ruined village of Deir esh Sheikh. Before us was a notable peaked knoll of Khurbet Sammûnieh, a conspicuous feature of the view, etc. …[the slopes] to the south were clothed with a dense brushwood of lentisk, arbutus, oak, hawthorn, cornel, kharûb, and other shrubs, while in the open glades the thyme, sage, citus (sic), and bellân carpetted (sic) the ledges with a thick fragrant undergrowth." Lt. Conder goes on to surmise that the knoll of Kh. Sammunieh could have been Kirjath Jearim or Baal, or even Gibeah, seeing that the Camp of Dan was located directly to their west.

In another description of the site, he writes: "Khurbet Sammunieh. Square foundations and cisterns. On the hill-top is a foundation measuring 23 feet north and south, 16 feet east and west. It is filled with rubbish. A stone with a draft 3 inches wide was observed in it. About 60 or 70 yards to the south is a rock-hewn cistern, 12 feet deep, 15 feet square, etc., etc." He names a well located to the south of the ruin, called Bir es Salib, cut in rock, 2½ feet square with a trough to the west, 5 feet by 10 feet.

Conder and Kitchener who visited the valley in the late 19th century under the auspices of the Palestine Exploration Fund noted that a branch of an ancient Roman road passed alongside the mountain on its southern side, leading from Bethlehem to Beth-shemesh.

=== British Mandate ===
In maps of the British Mandate period, the site also appears as Khirbet et-Tantura. Archaeologists have proposed that this name embodies the Aramaic concept of "mountain" = Tur. In older PEF maps of Conder and Kitchener, the name is Sammunieh, reminiscent of the Hebrew name Shimon. A brook that flows immediately beneath the mountain, Wadi Ismaʻin, is also thought to be a corruption of Shimon.

== Archaeology ==
Boaz Zissu, who conducted an archaeological survey of the site in 1992–1997 for the Israel Antiquities Authority, dated the town to the 2nd century BCE and believes it is named for Simon the Hasmonaean, who was known as a builder of fortresses. The town continued to be inhabited until the Bar Kokhba revolt under Hadrian, when it was destroyed. Another survey of the site was conducted in 2001. Some 45% of the sherds examined on the mountain proved to be from the Hellenistic period, while another 35% of sherds examined showed evidence of being from the early Roman period. The remaining sherds were shown to be from the Iron Age III (12%), and from the Byzantine era (8%).

== Access ==
Access to the ruin is easiest on its south, southwestern quarter, on account of its steep declivities on all other sides which render it nearly inaccessible. At its top, there is a slight spur extending to its north, on which leveled field part of the village was formerly built. Together with the higher elevated part they comprise about 15 dunams (3.7 acres). The site can be reached via footpaths leading down into the Sorek valley from off regional highway 3866, near Moshav Nes Harim.

== Gallery ==
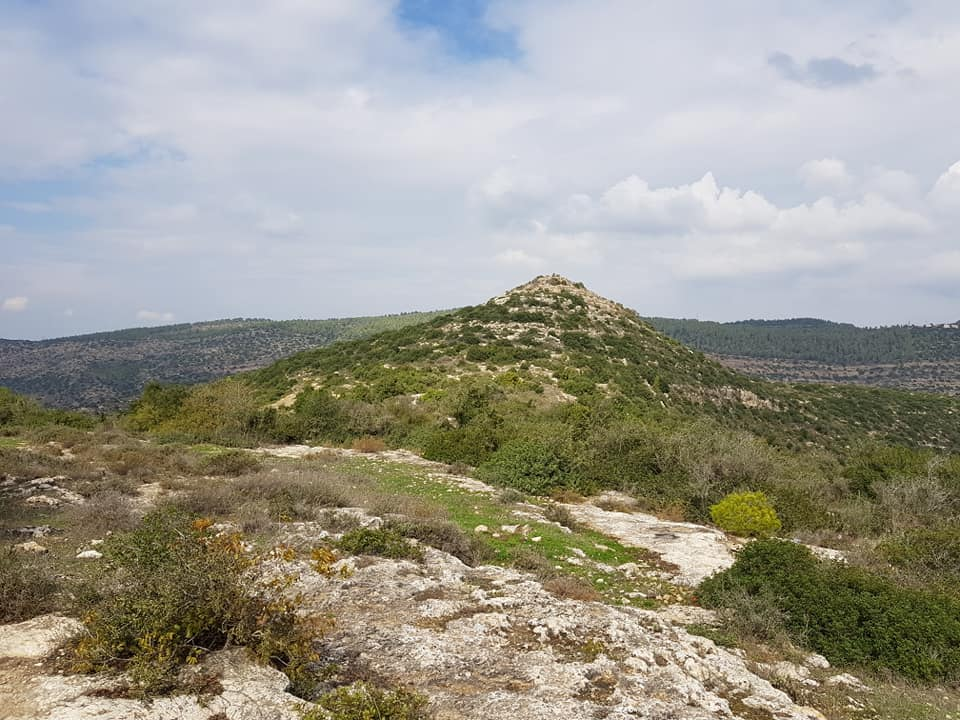
Tur Shimon - Kh. Sammunieh

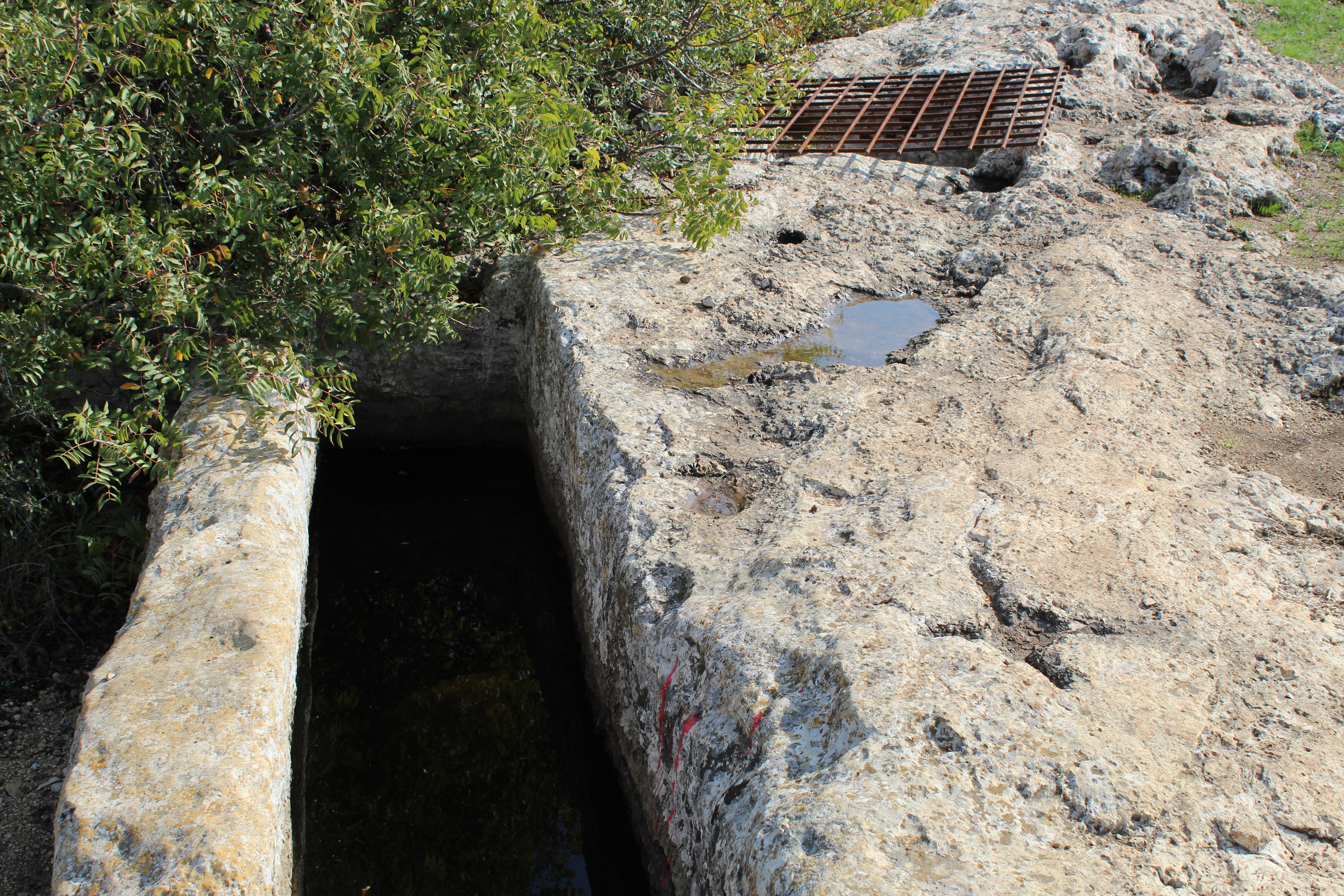
A well and trough beneath Tur Shimon

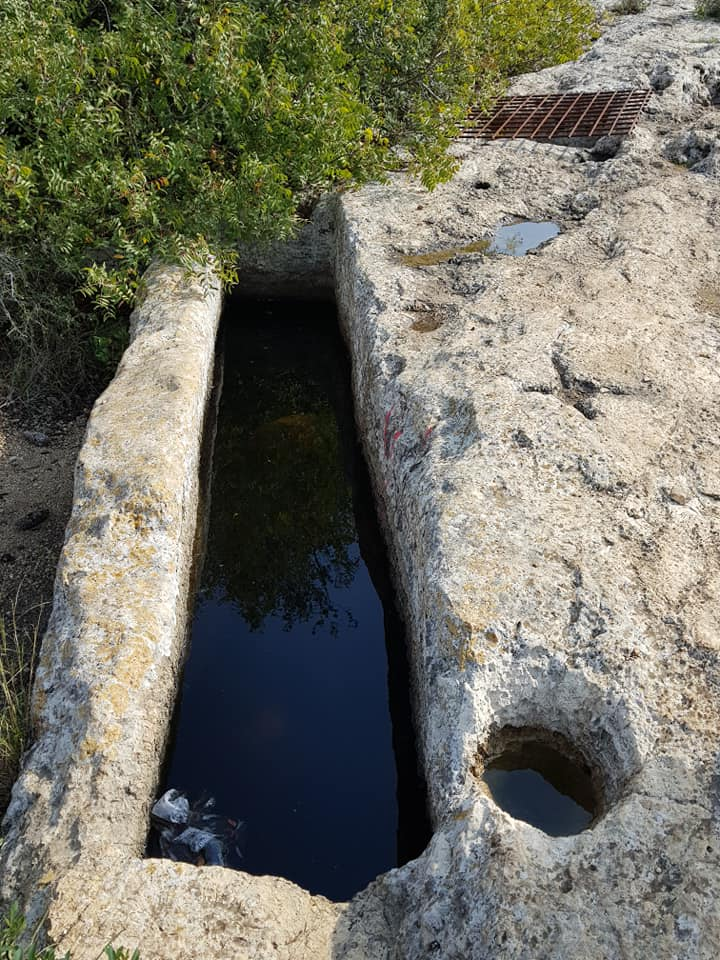
Well and trough

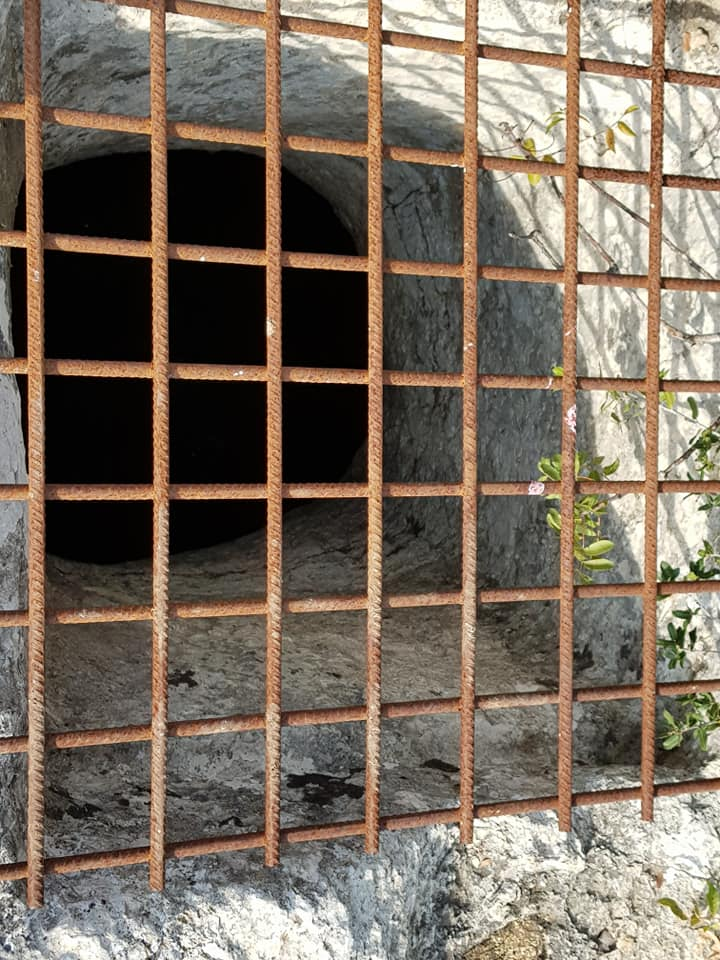
Mouth of well beneath mountain

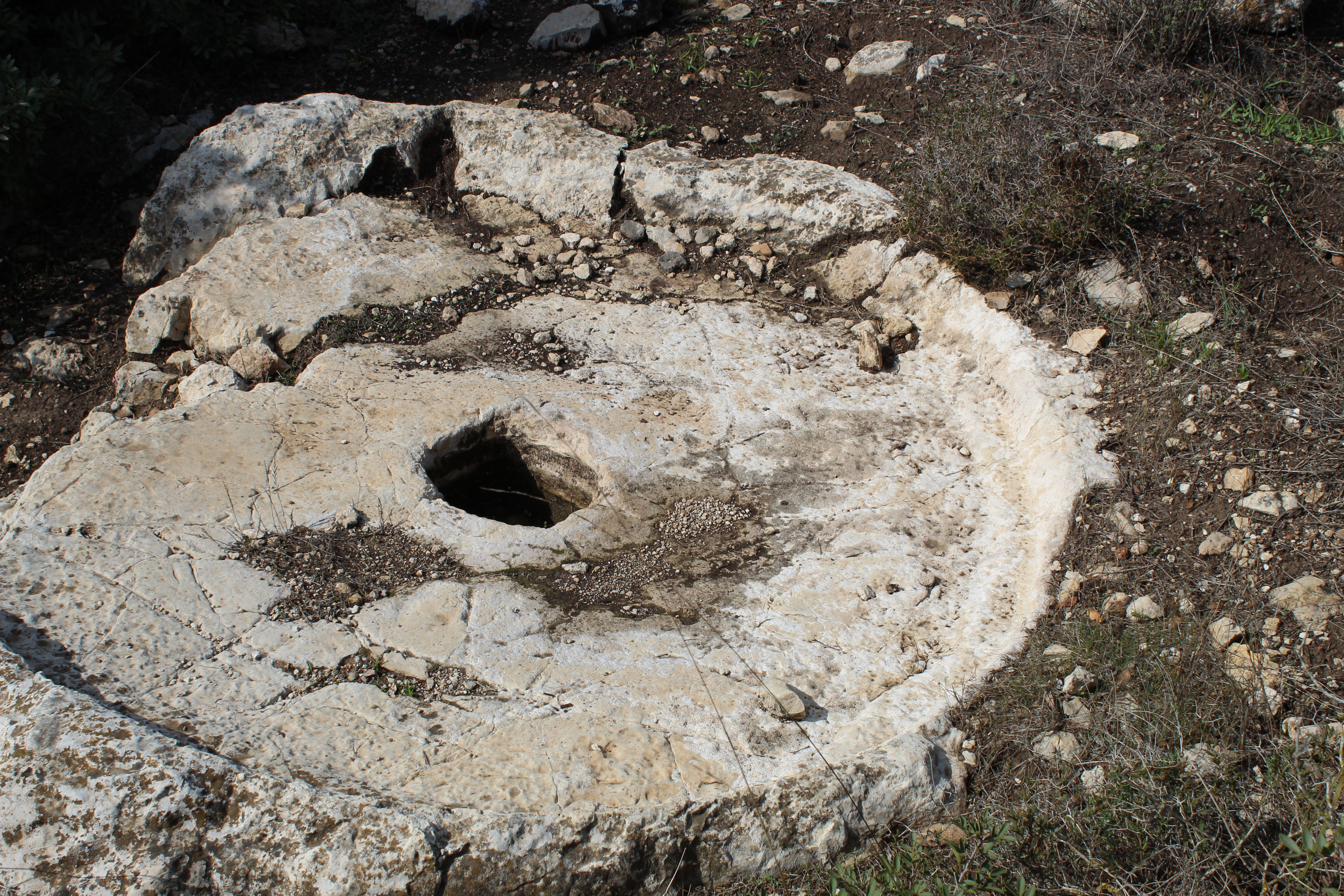
Stone of olive press beneath the mountain

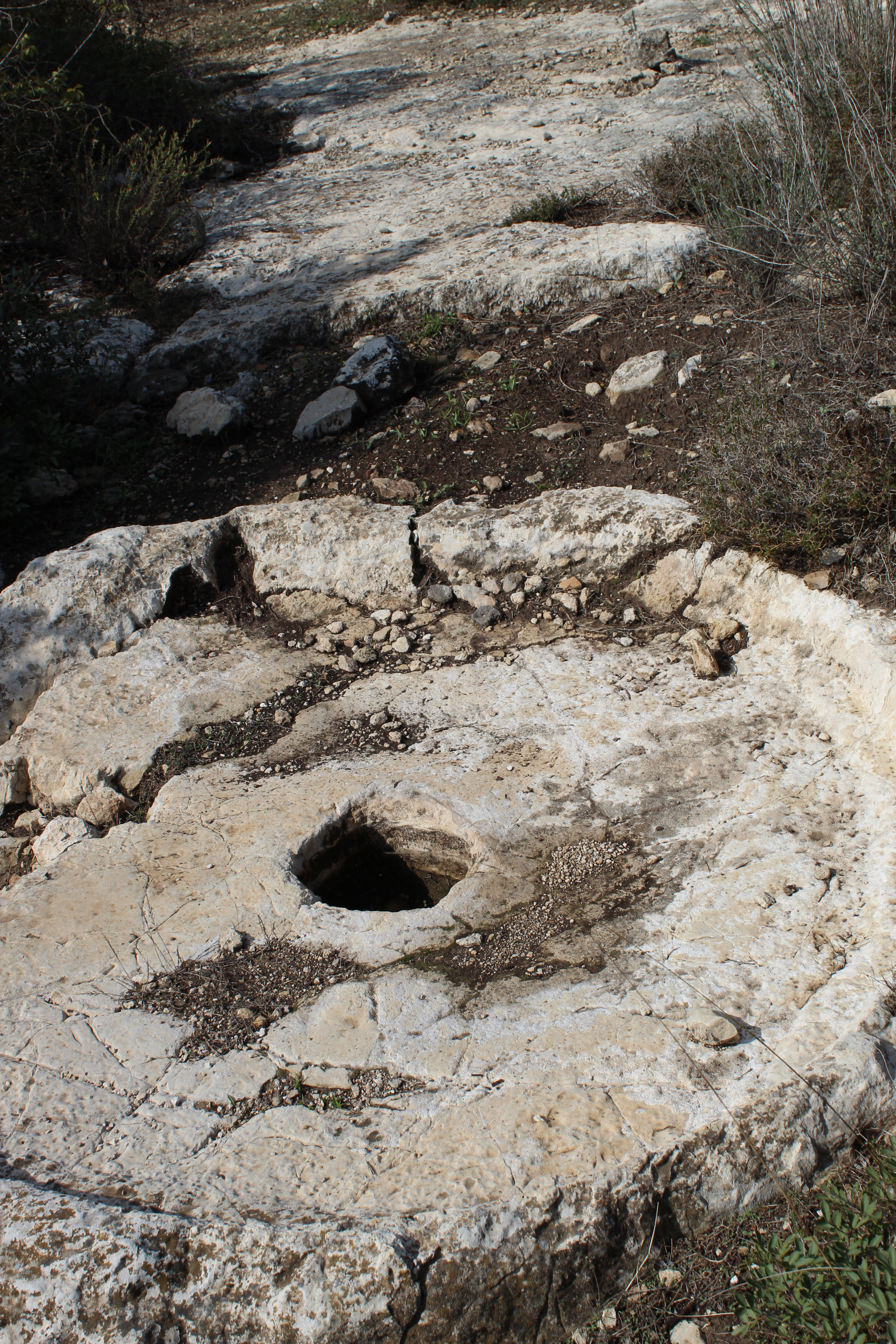
Olive press

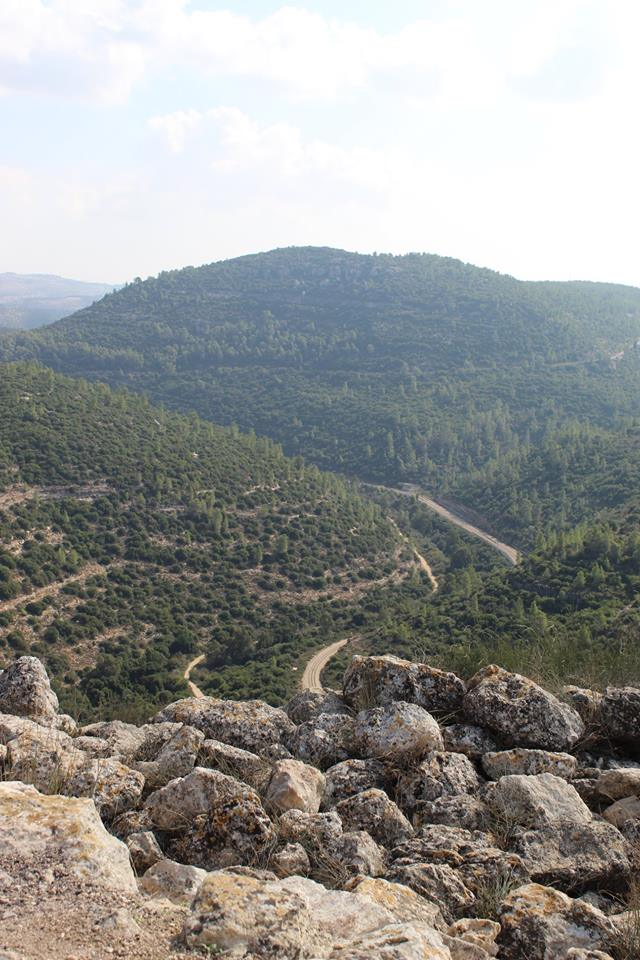
View from atop Tur Shimon

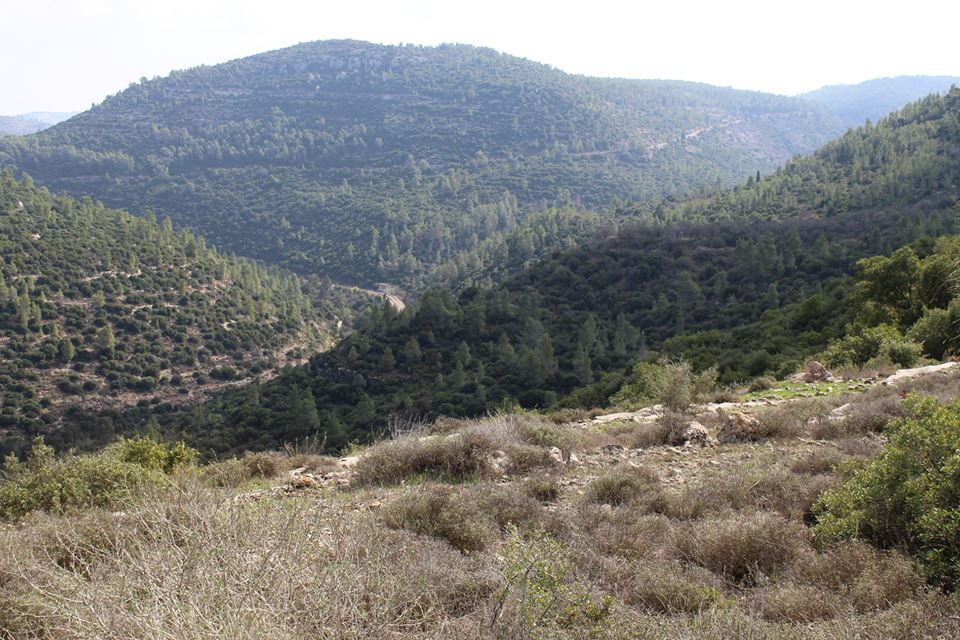
General view of region seen from Tur Shimon

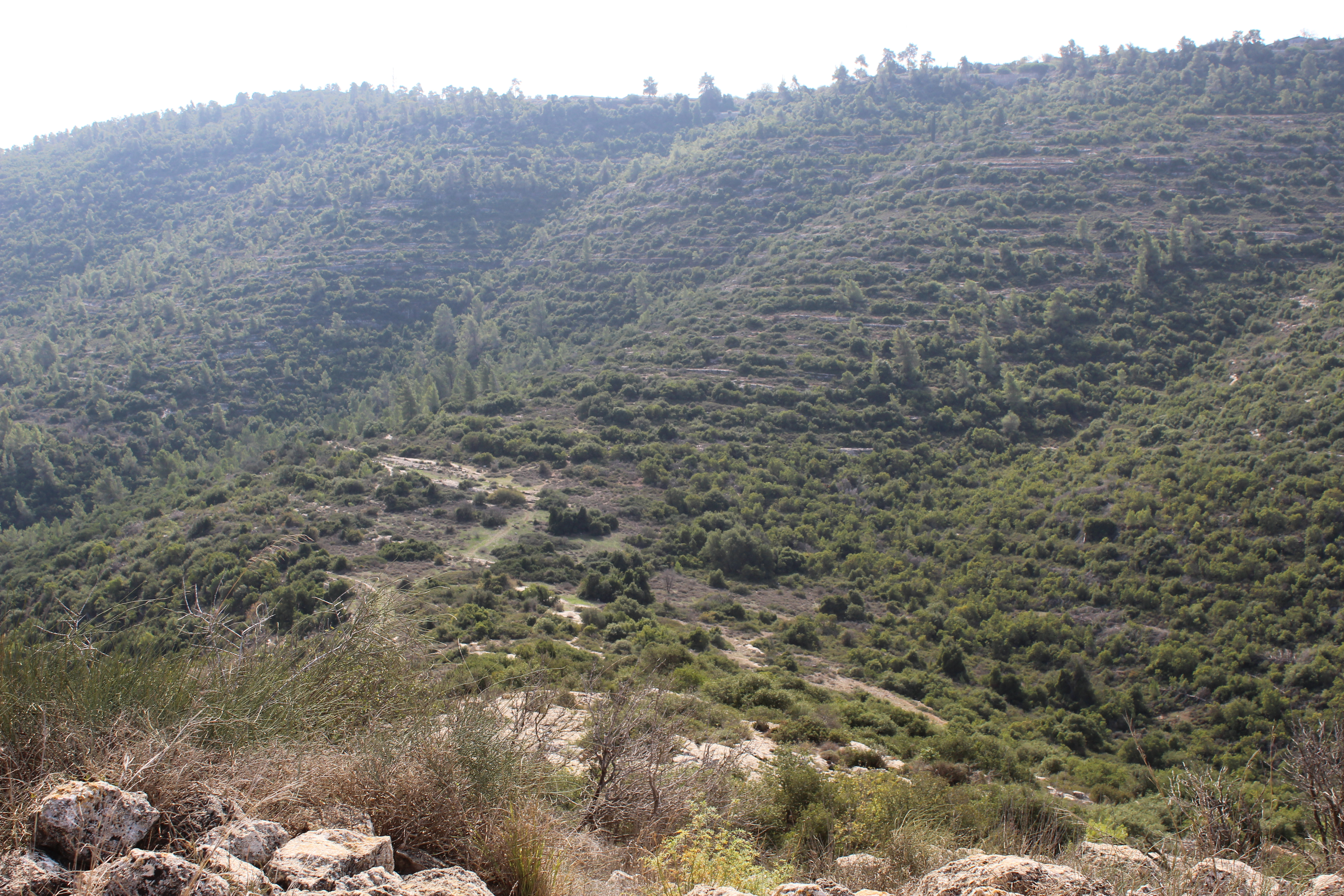
Valley to the south of Tur Shimon

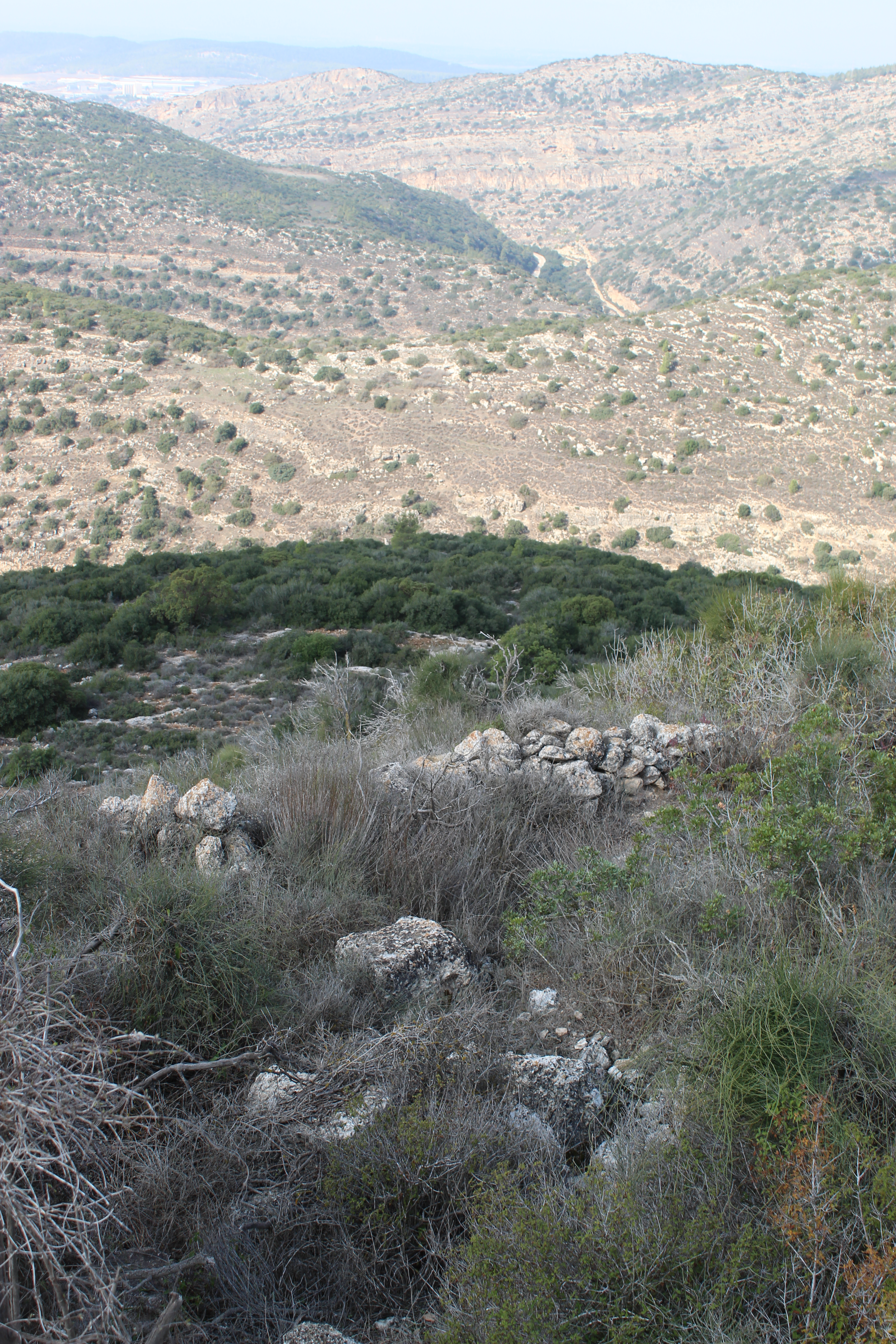
View from mountain looking west

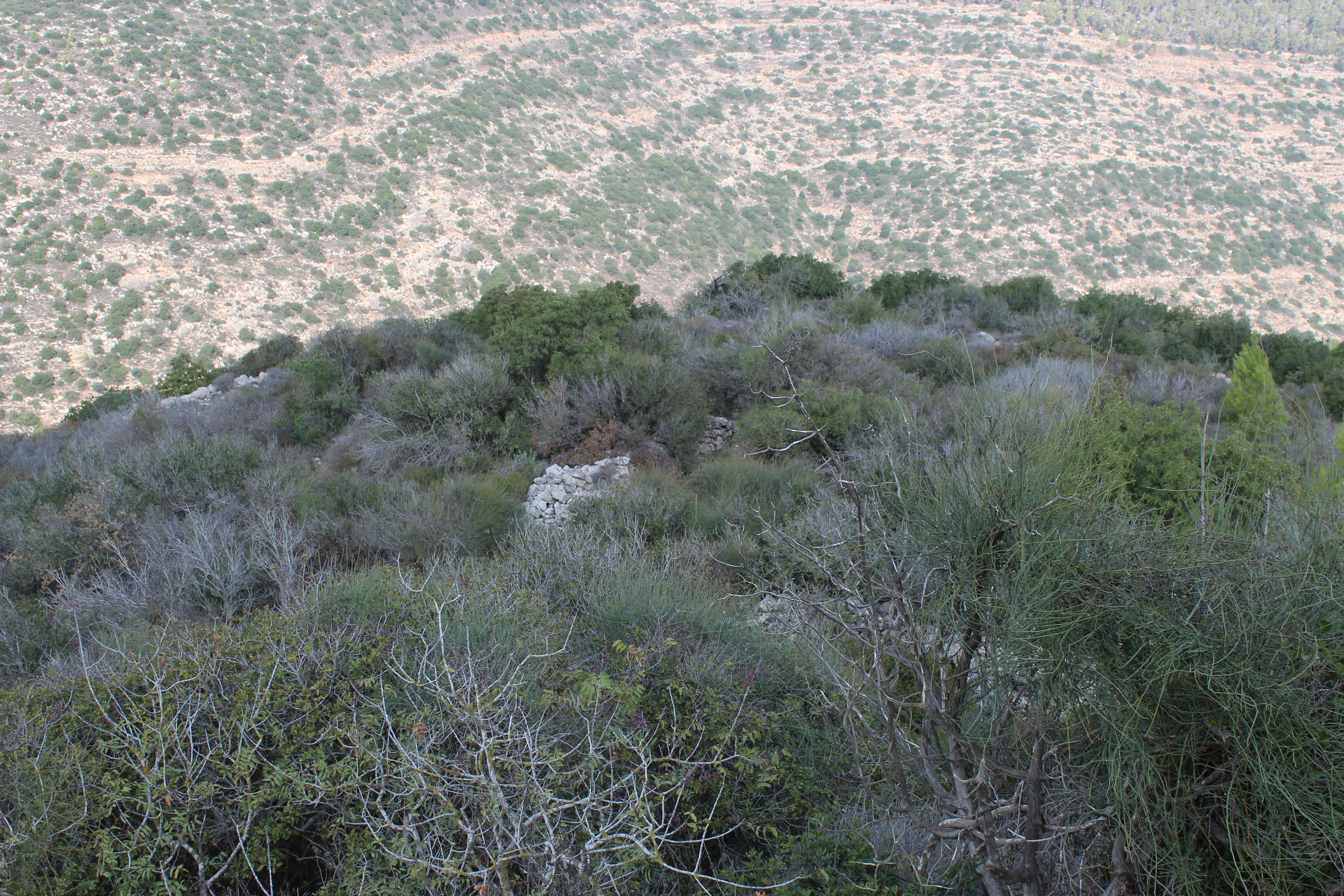
Brushwood growing atop Tur Shimon

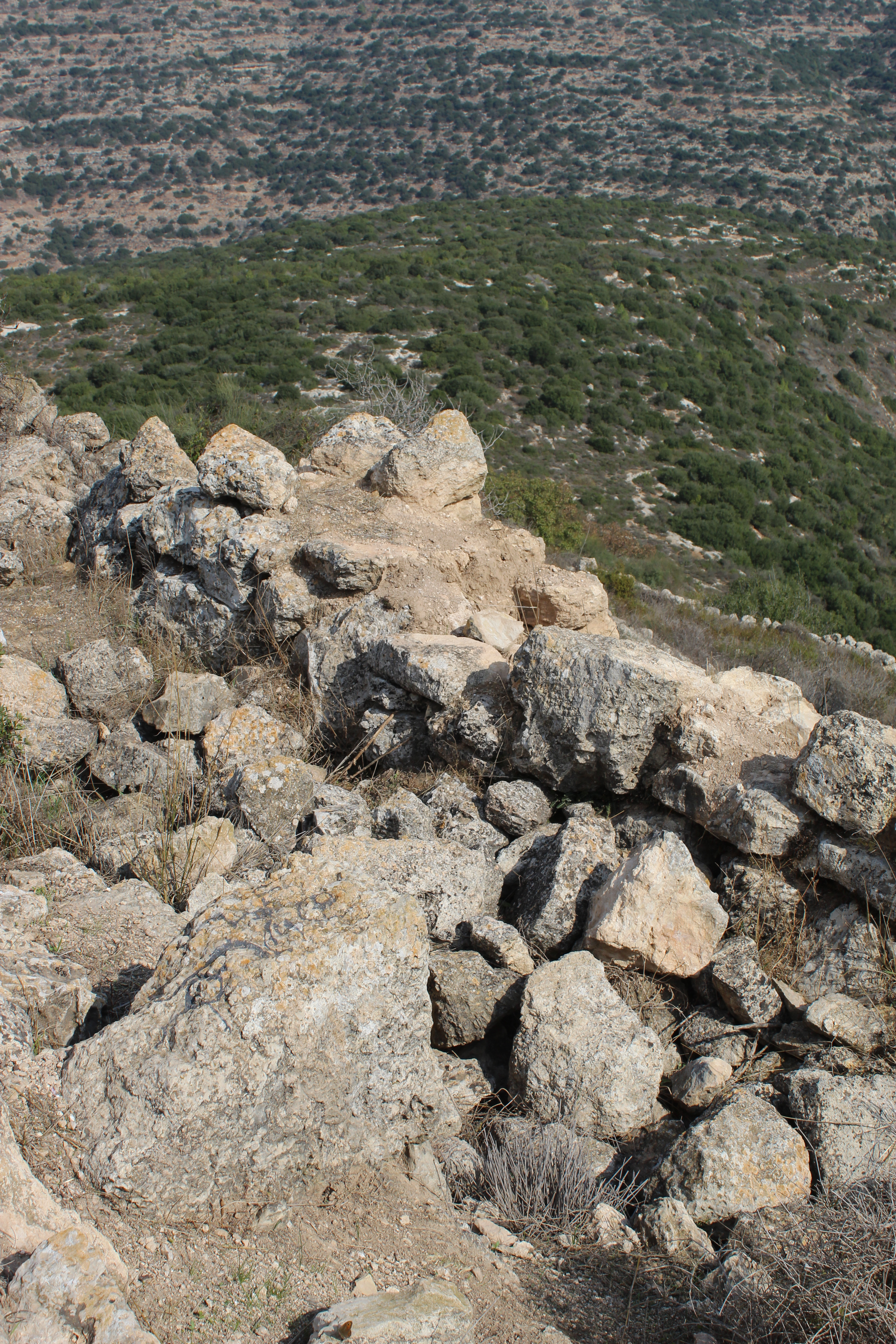
Remnant of old wall on Tur Shimon

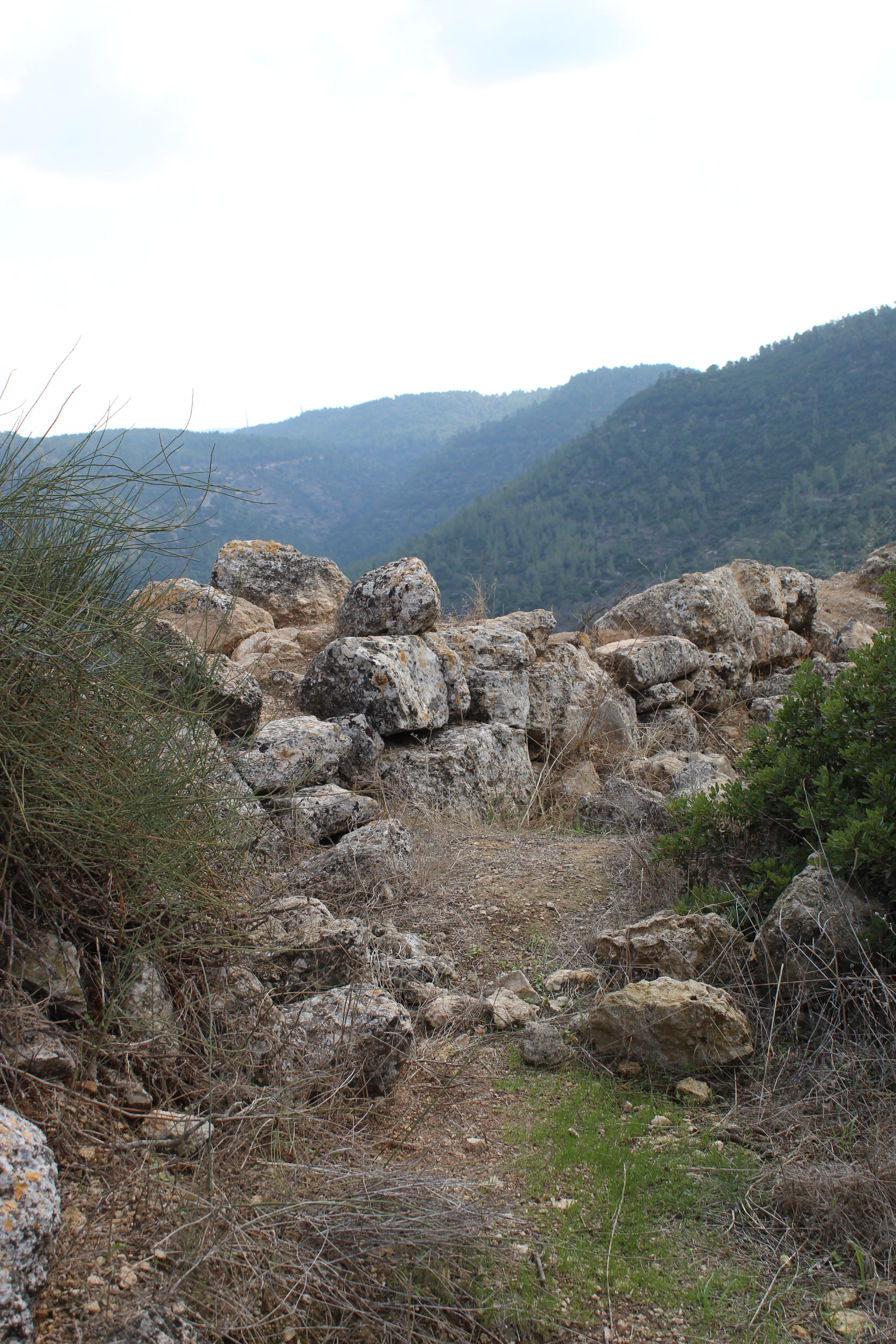
Wall at Tur Shimon

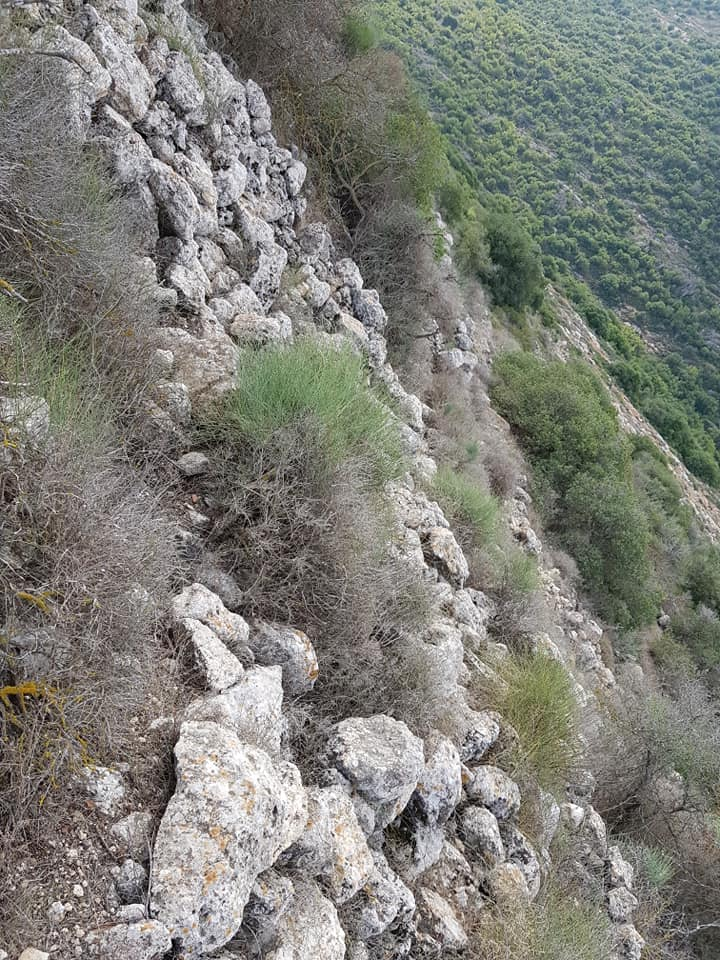
Steep declivity at Tur Shimon

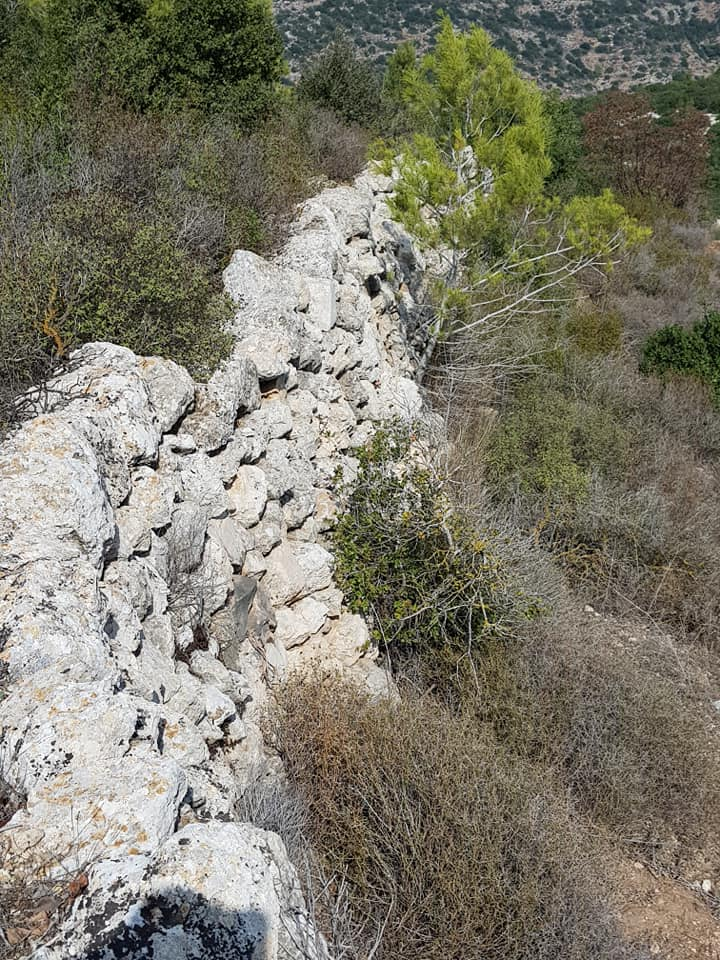
Wall of Tur Shimon

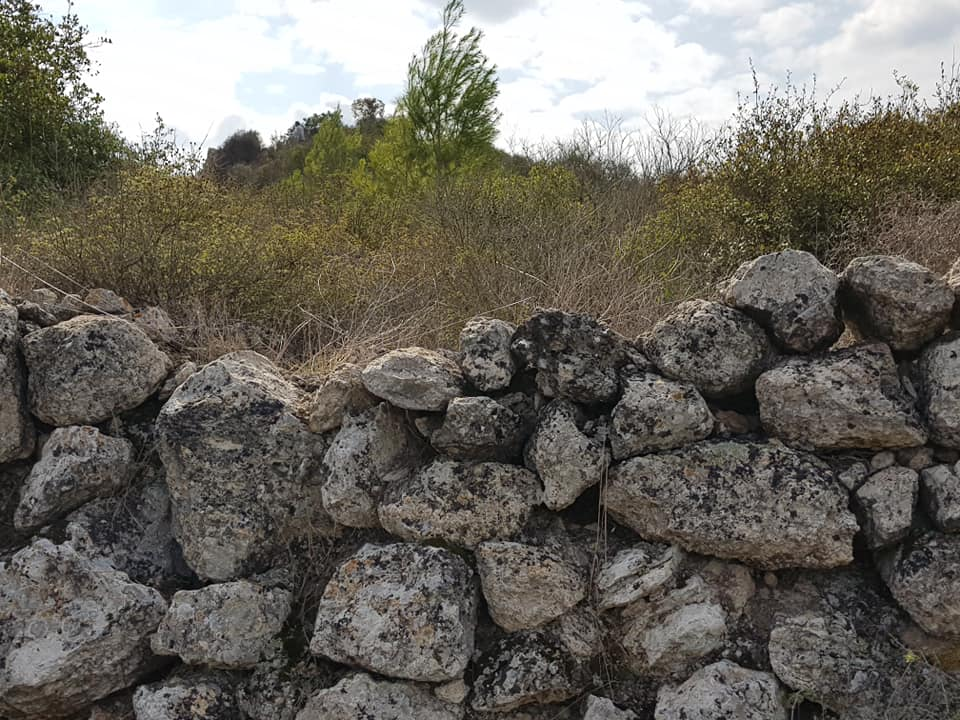
Stone wall (Tur Shimon)

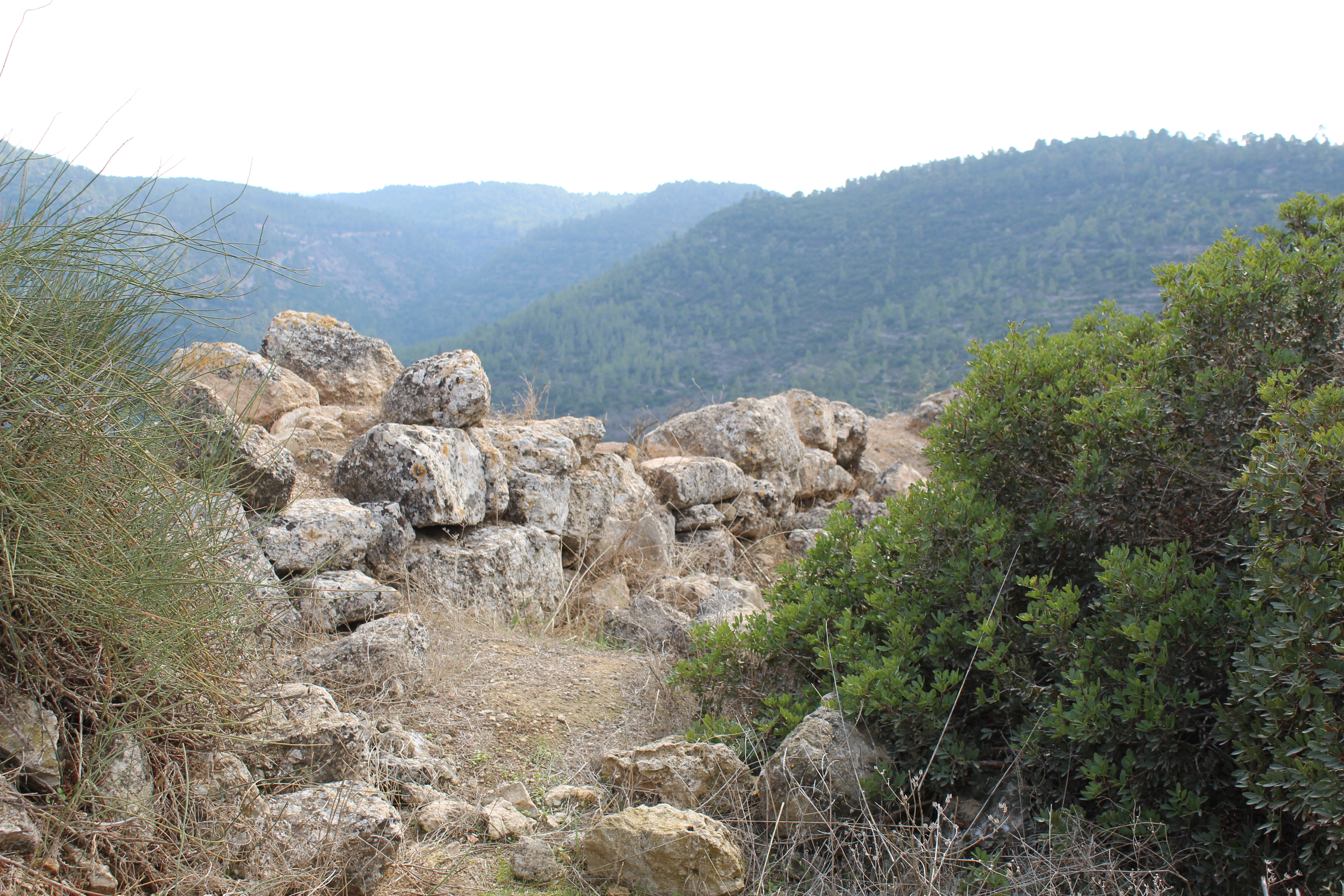
Hurvat Tura, stone structures

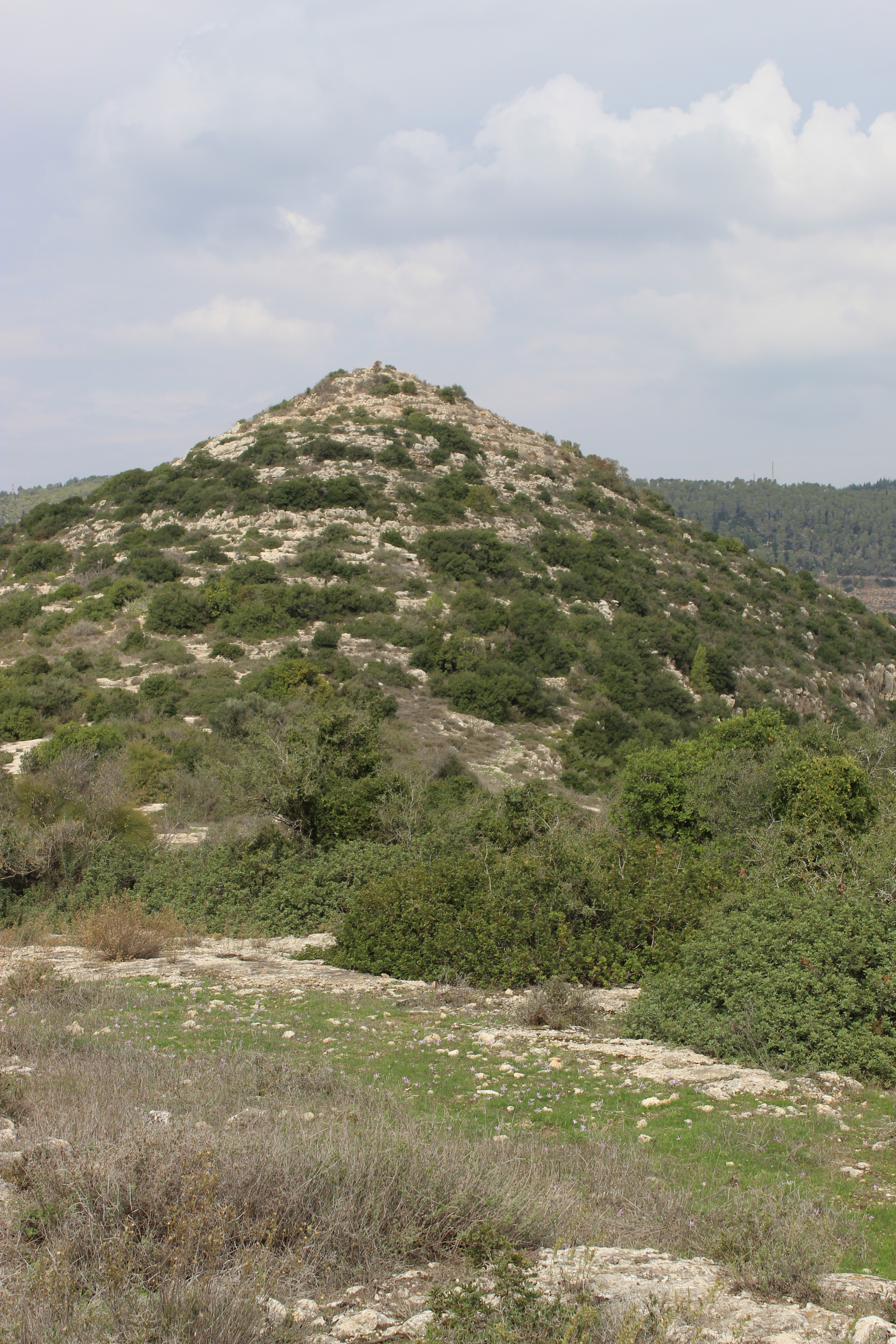
View of Tur Shimon (Hurvat Tura)

== See also ==
- Archaeology of Israel
- Artabba
- Khirbet Jamjum
- Khirbet Kefireh

== Bibliography ==
- Conder, C.R. (1881). "Lieutenants Conder´s report". Quarterly Statement - Palestine Exploration Fund. 13: 247–281. (p. 264)
- Conder, C.R.; Kitchener, H.H. (1883). The Survey of Western Palestine: Memoirs of the Topography, Orography, Hydrography, and Archaeology. Vol. 3. London: Committee of the Palestine Exploration Fund.
- Zissu, Boaz [in Hebrew] (2004). "The Hellenistic Fortress at Ḥorvat Tura in the Jerusalem Hills and Identification of Tur Shimon". Cathedra: For the History of Eretz Israel and Its Yishuv. 112: 5–18. JSTOR 23407251. (Hebrew)
