= Nahal Sorek =

River in Israel

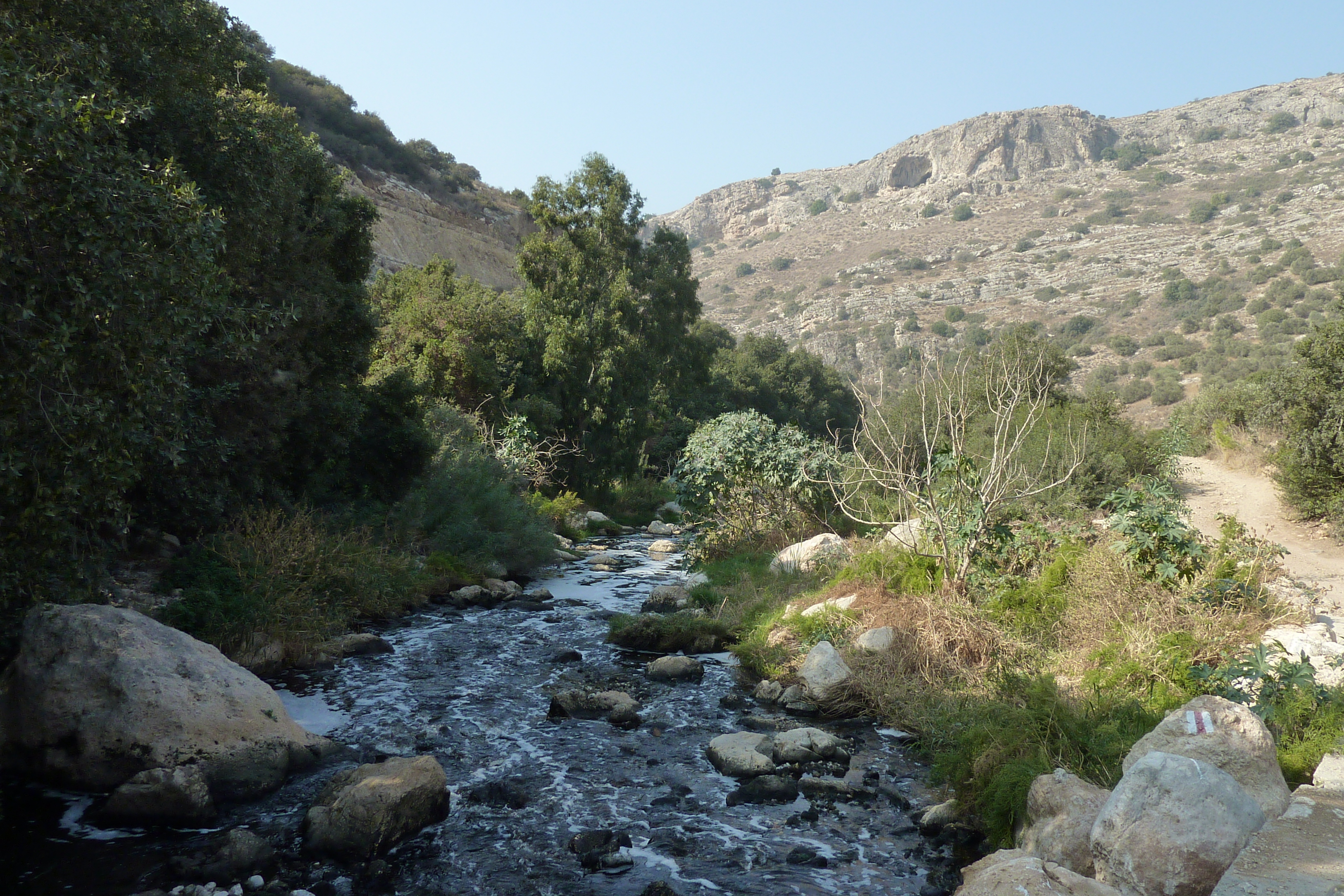

Physical characteristics
- Source: Judaean Mountains
  - location: Ramallah, West Bank
  - coordinates: 31°52′53″N 35°11′15″E
- Mouth: Mediterranean Sea
  - location: Palmachim, Israel
  - coordinates: 31°56′36″N 34°42′30″E

The Nahal Sorek, (Note: Hebrew: נחל שורק; Arabic: وادي الصرار (Wadi es-Sarar) or نهر روبين (Nahr Rubin).) also Soreq, is a river in the West Bank and Israel. It rises south of Ramallah in the Judean Hills, flows westwards into the coastal plain, and empties into the Mediterranean at Palmachim. Its valley is mentioned in the Book of Judges as the home of Delilah.

== Names ==
The Hebrew name Nahal Sorek means "wadi of choice vines". The river is known in Arabic by a variety of names, including (in its upper reaches) Wadi es-Sarar and (at its mouth) Nahr Rubin. The former name means "wadi of pebbles", while the latter name means "river of Reuben", in reference to Reuben, son of Jacob, who is said to have been buried on the river's southern bank.

== Railway ==
The historic Jaffa–Jerusalem railway, opened in 1892, follows the Valley of Sorek and the tributary Valley of Rephaim as it climbs from the coastal plain to Jerusalem. It was superseded in 2018 by a more direct high-speed line.

== Nature Reserve ==
The Nahal Sorek Nature Reserve, created in 1965 and since expanded, spans over 11000 dunams, from the Avshalom Cave Nature Reserve near Beit Shemesh to moshav Nes Harim.

== Desalination plants ==
Near the mouth of the Nahal Sorek are two large seawater desalination plants, Palmachim and Sorek, the latter being, when used at full capacity, the largest of its kind in the world (as of 2013).

== Gallery ==
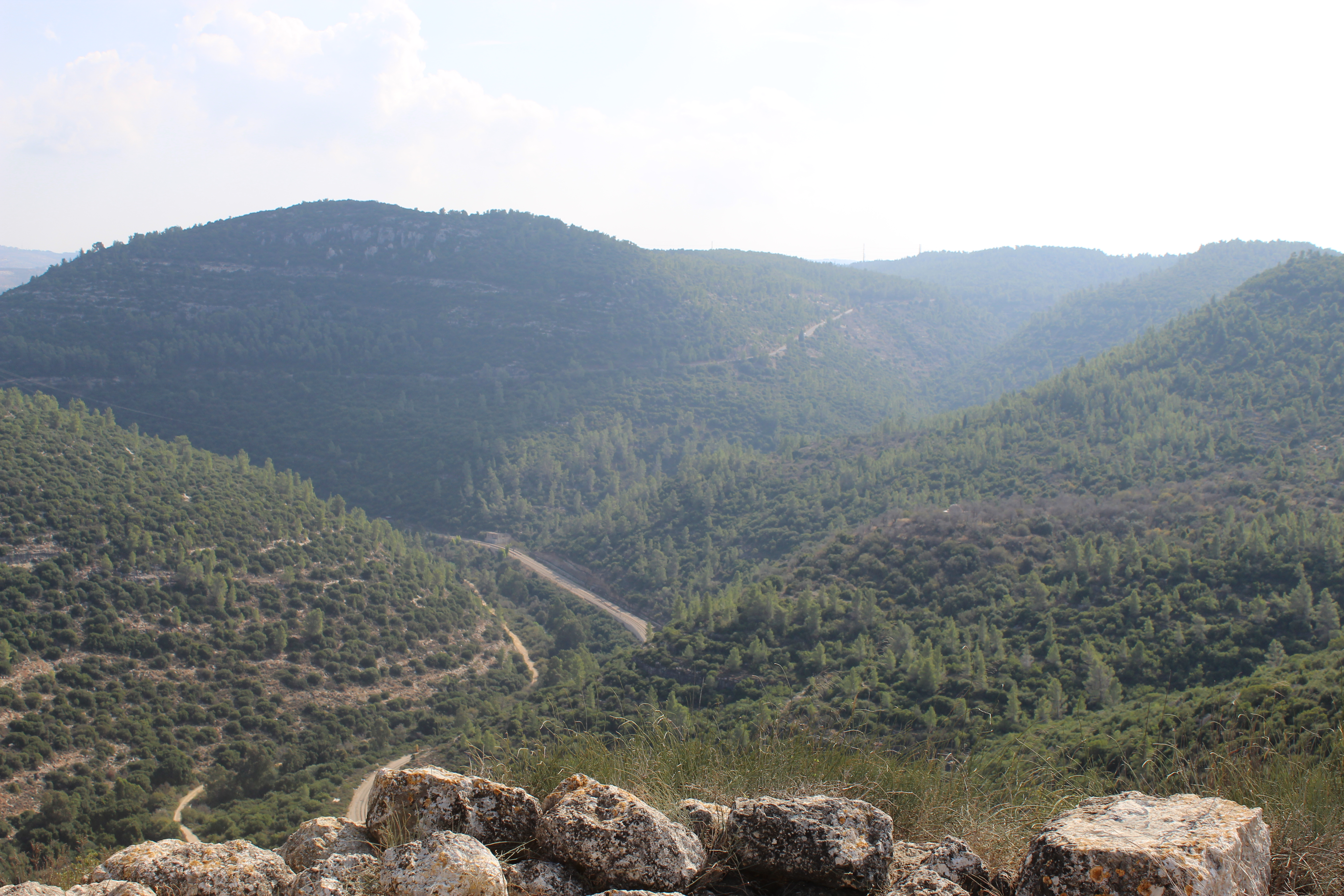
View up the Valley of Sorek from Tur Shimon

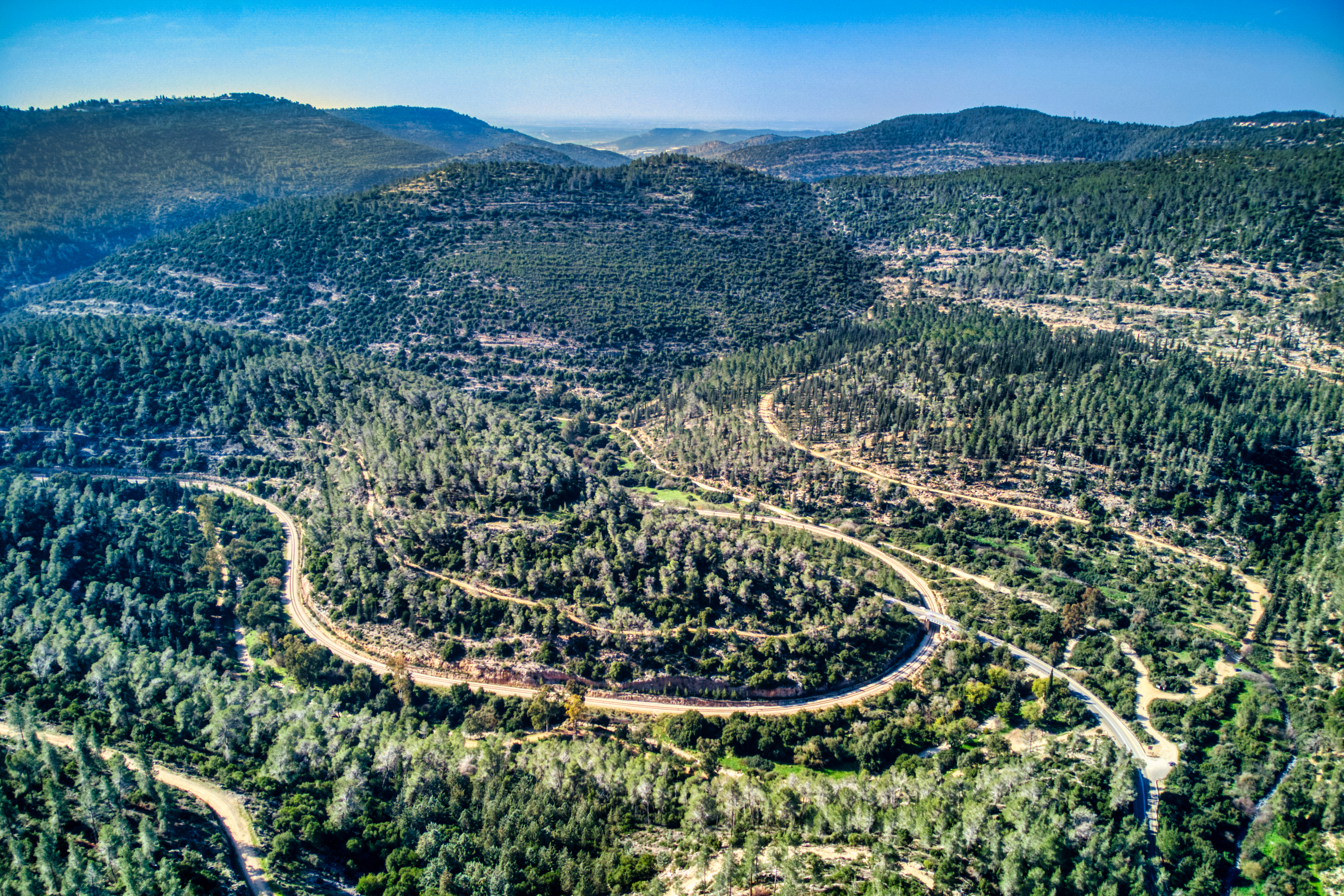
Overview of the point where the valleys of Rephaim (left) and Sorek (right) converge

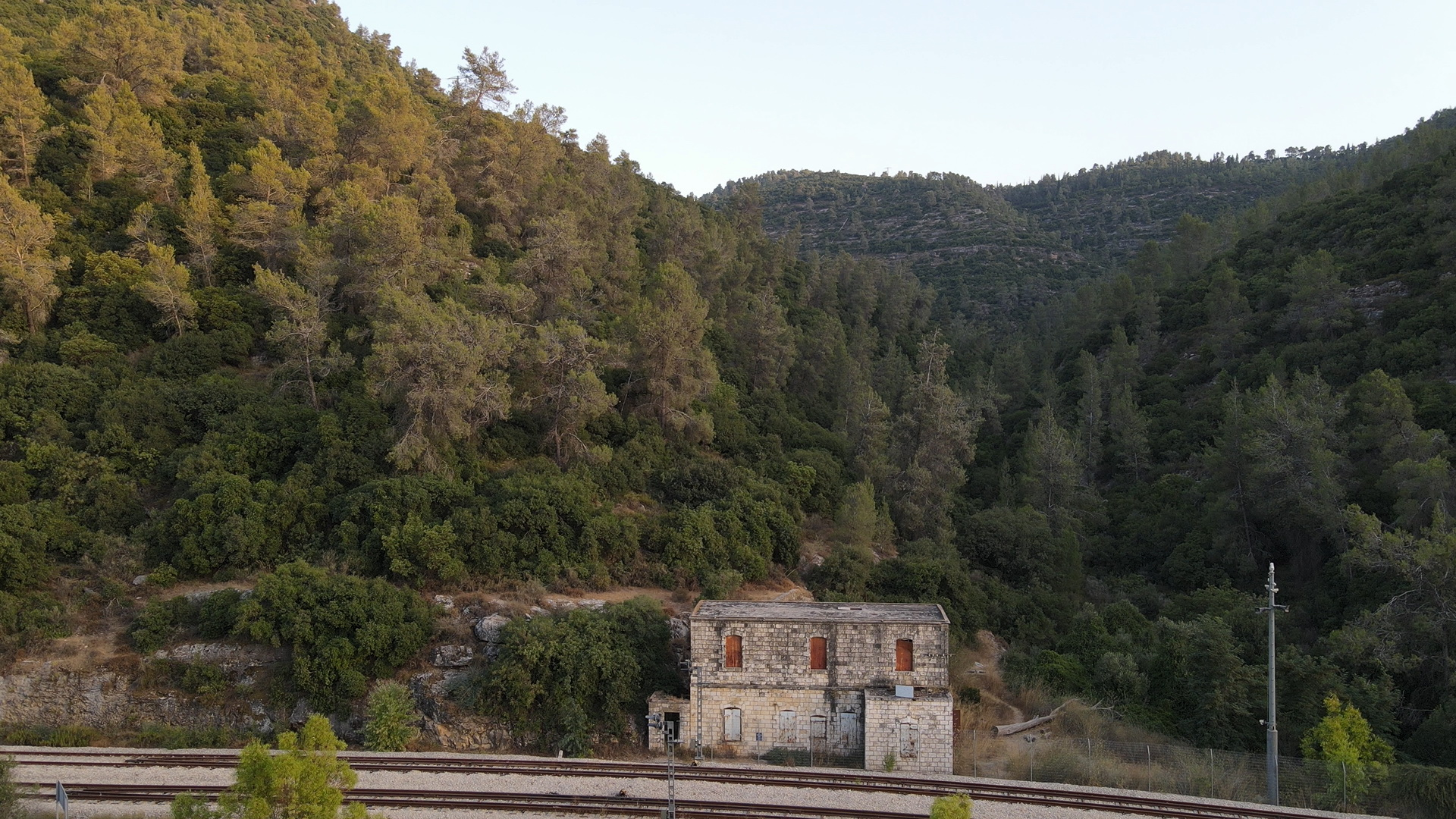
Abandoned railway station in the Valley of Sorek

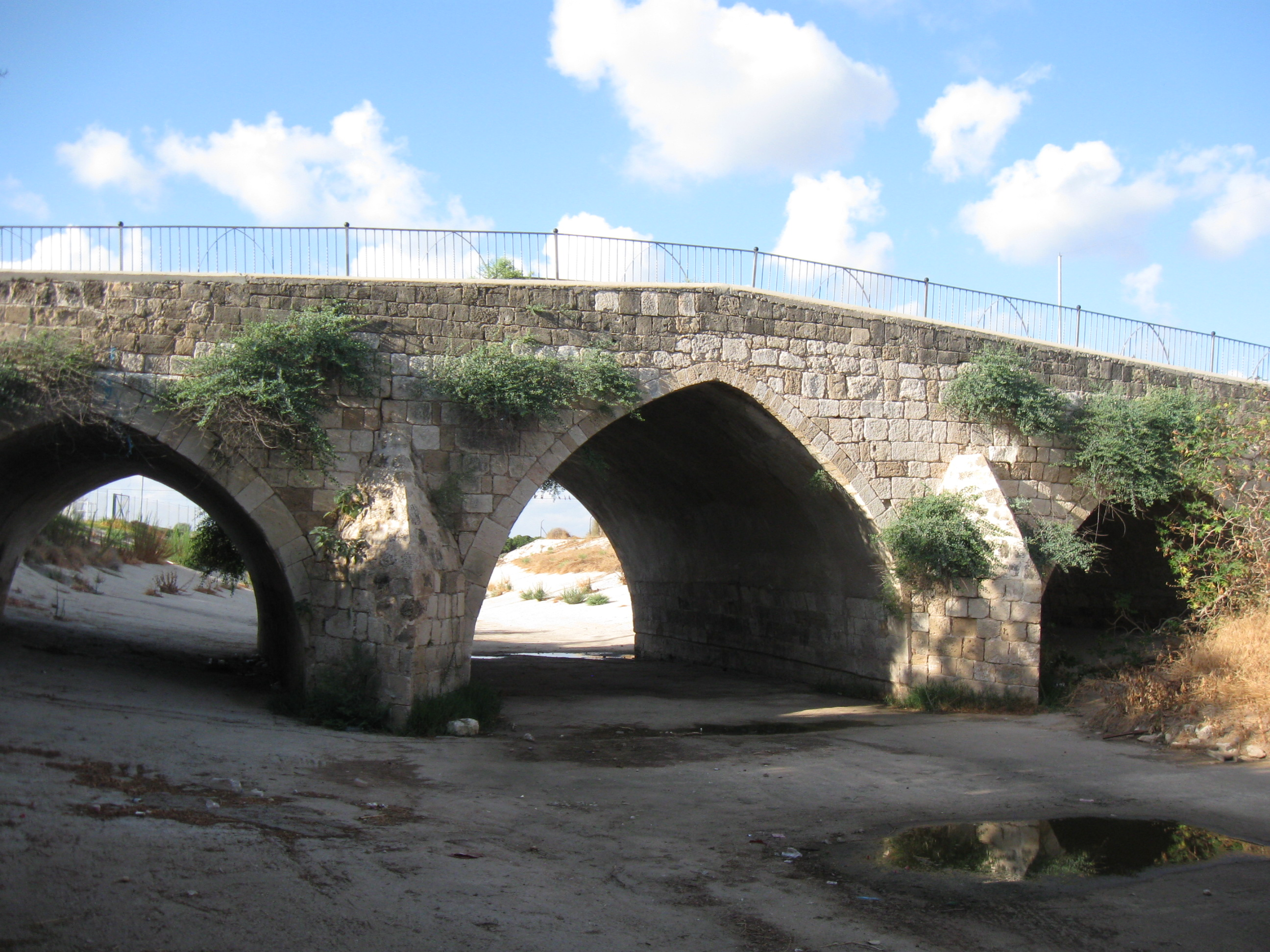
The 13th-century Yibna Bridge, seen from the dry bed of the Sorek

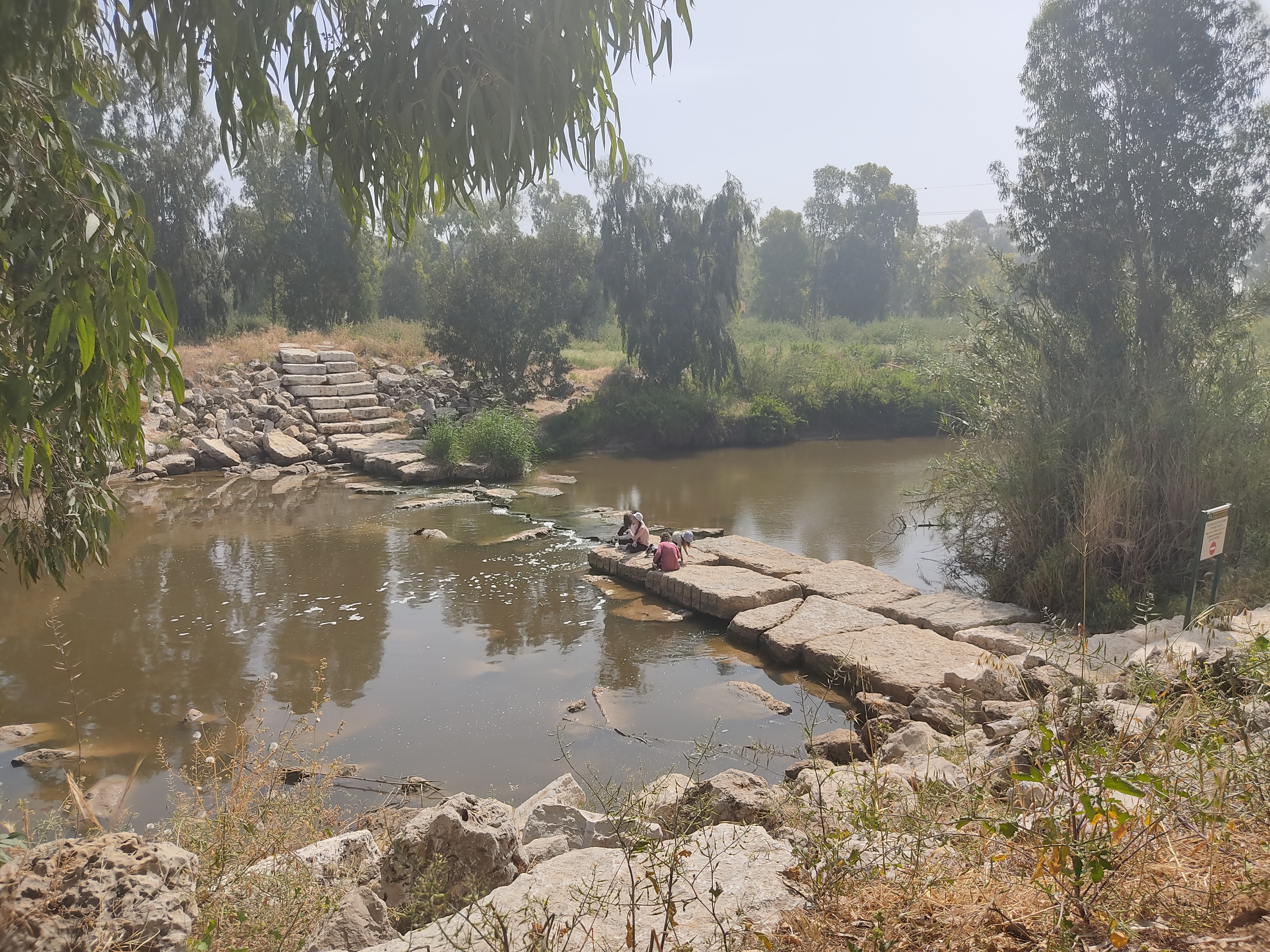
The Sorek near its mouth

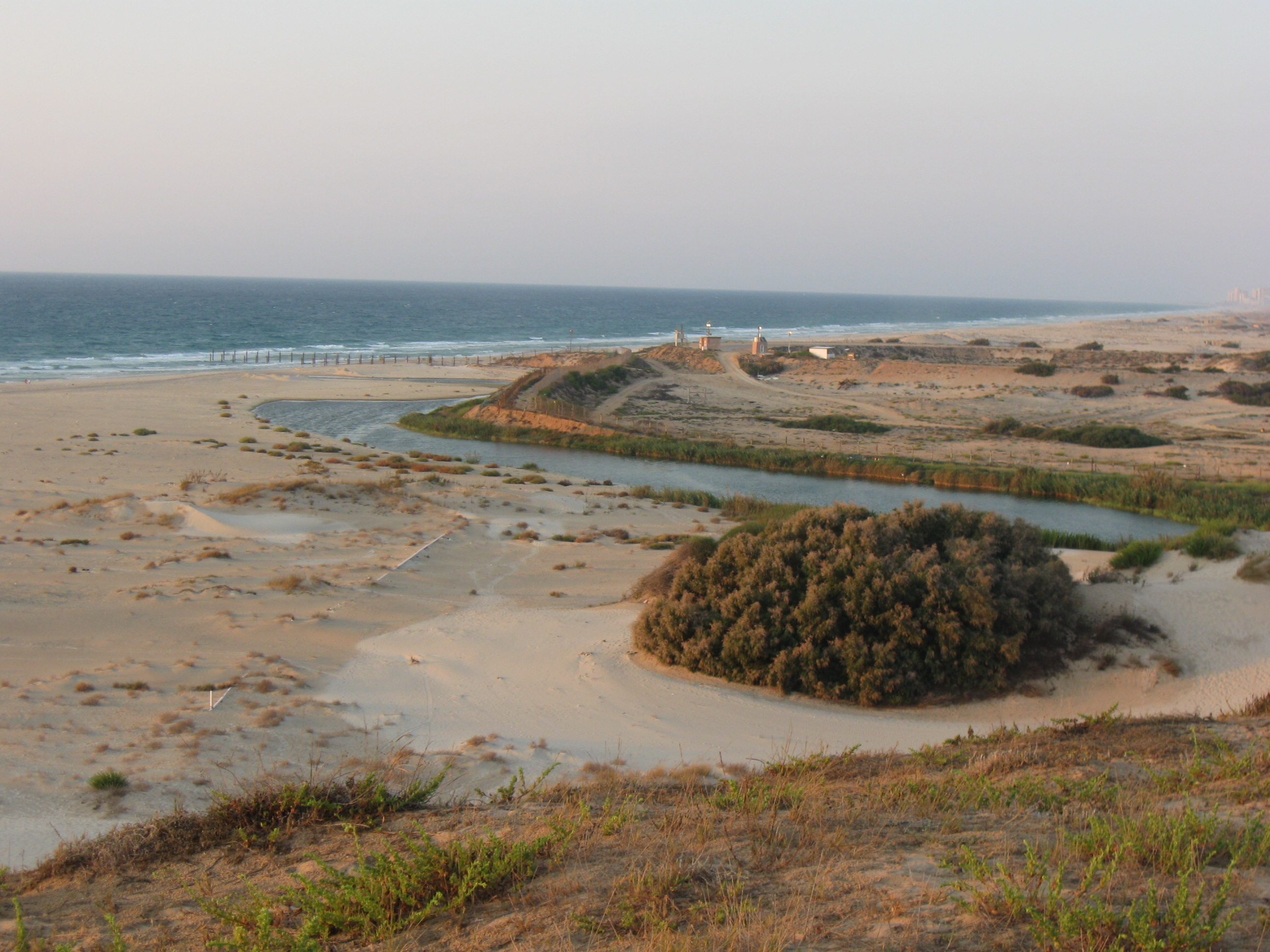
The mouth of the river

== See also ==
- Nahal Sorek Regional Council, administrative district situated along the Sorek Valley
- Soreq Nuclear Research Center, a research and development institute
- Timnah, Philistine city mentioned in the Bible, identified with Tel Batash in the Sorek Valley
- Zorah, biblical town in Judah, identified with a site overlooking the Sorek Valley
