= Avshalom Cave =

Limestone cave in Israel

Coordinates: 31°45′21″N 35°01′24″E

Avshalom Nature Reserve
- Soreq/Sorek Cave, Avshalom Cave, Stalactites Cave
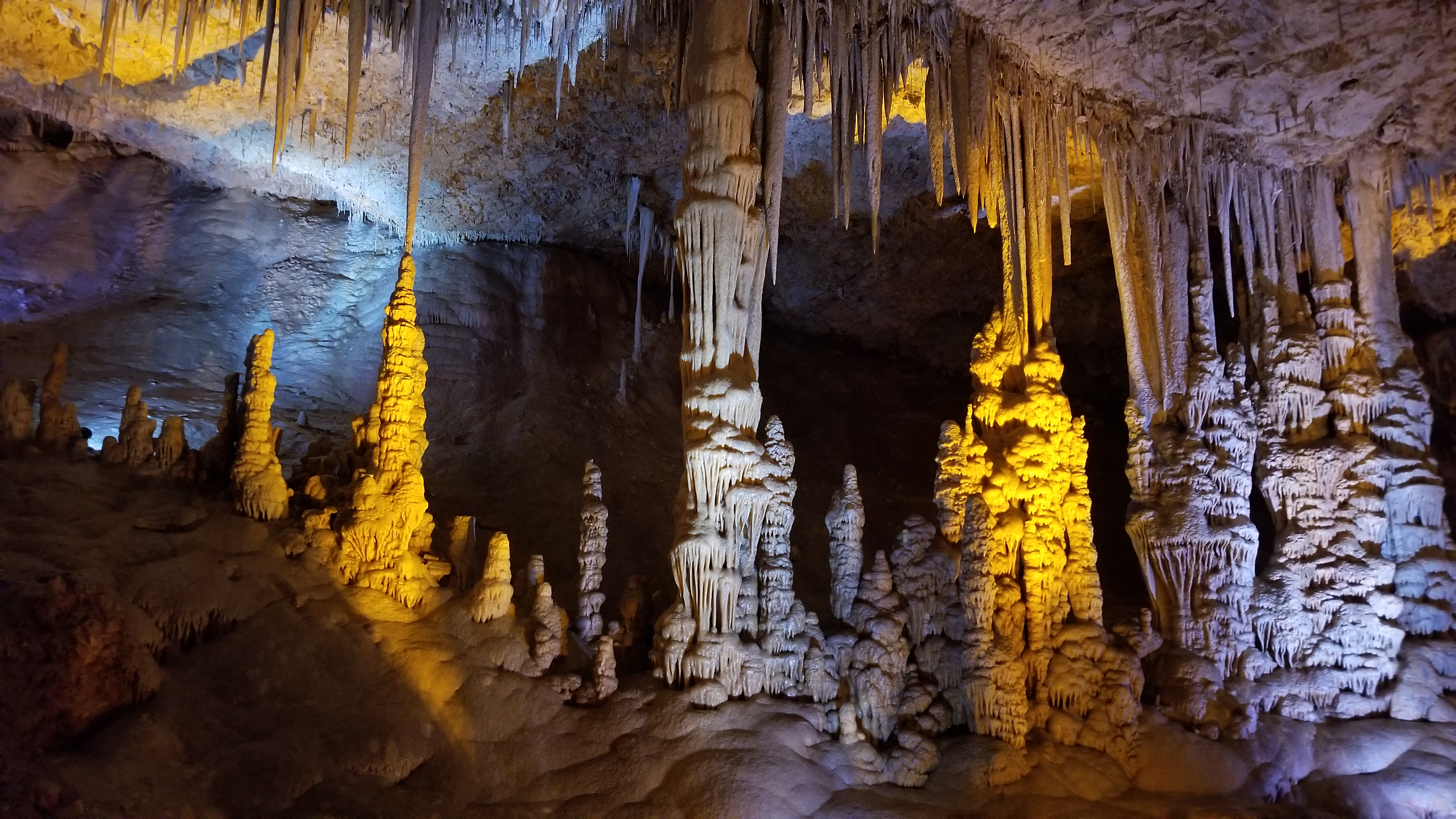
- Interactive map of Avshalom Nature Reserve
- Location: On the western slopes of the Judean Hills, south of Nahal Soreq and approximately 2 kilometers east of Bet Shemesh.
- Nearest city: Bet Shemesh
- Governing body: Israel Nature and Parks Authority

Avshalom Cave (Hebrew: מערת אבשלום, romanized: Me'arat Avshalom), known in academic literature as Soreq Cave (Hebrew: מערת שׂורק, romanized: Me'arat Soreq; Arabic: مغارة سوريك, romanized: Mghar Suriq) and popularly as Stalactites Cave (Hebrew: מערת הנטיפים, romanized: Me'arat HaNetifim), is a 5,000 m^{2} cave on the western side of Mt. Ye'ela, in the Judean hills in Israel, known for its dense concentration of stalactites and other cave formations. It is a popular show cave, as well as a highly valued witness of the climate evolution over the last 185,000 years.

== Name ==
The cave is named after the Soreq/Sorek Valley (Nahal Sorek) and after Avshalom Shoham, an Israeli soldier killed in the War of Attrition.

== Location ==
Avshalom Cave is situated near Hartuv, 3 km east of Bet Shemesh, Israel.

== Discovery ==
The cave was discovered accidentally in May 1968, while quarrying with explosives.

After its discovery, the location of the cave was kept a secret for several years for fear of damage to its natural treasures.

== Description ==
The cave is 83 m long, 60 m wide, and 15 m high.

The temperature and the humidity in the cave are constant year round.

Some of the stalactites found in the cave are four meters long, and some have been dated as 300,000 years old. Some meet stalagmites to form stone pillars.

== Paleoclimate research: significance ==
The cave has been the focus of paleoclimate research, which allowed reconstruction of the region's semi-arid climate for the past 185,000 years. According to the American geologist James Aronson, the Soreq Cave is the Rosetta Stone of climate history in the Eastern Mediterranean.

== Tourism ==
The cave is now open to visitors, in the heart of the 67-dunam Avshalom Nature Reserve, declared in 1975. In 2012, a new lighting system was installed to prevent the formation and growth of algae.

== Gallery ==
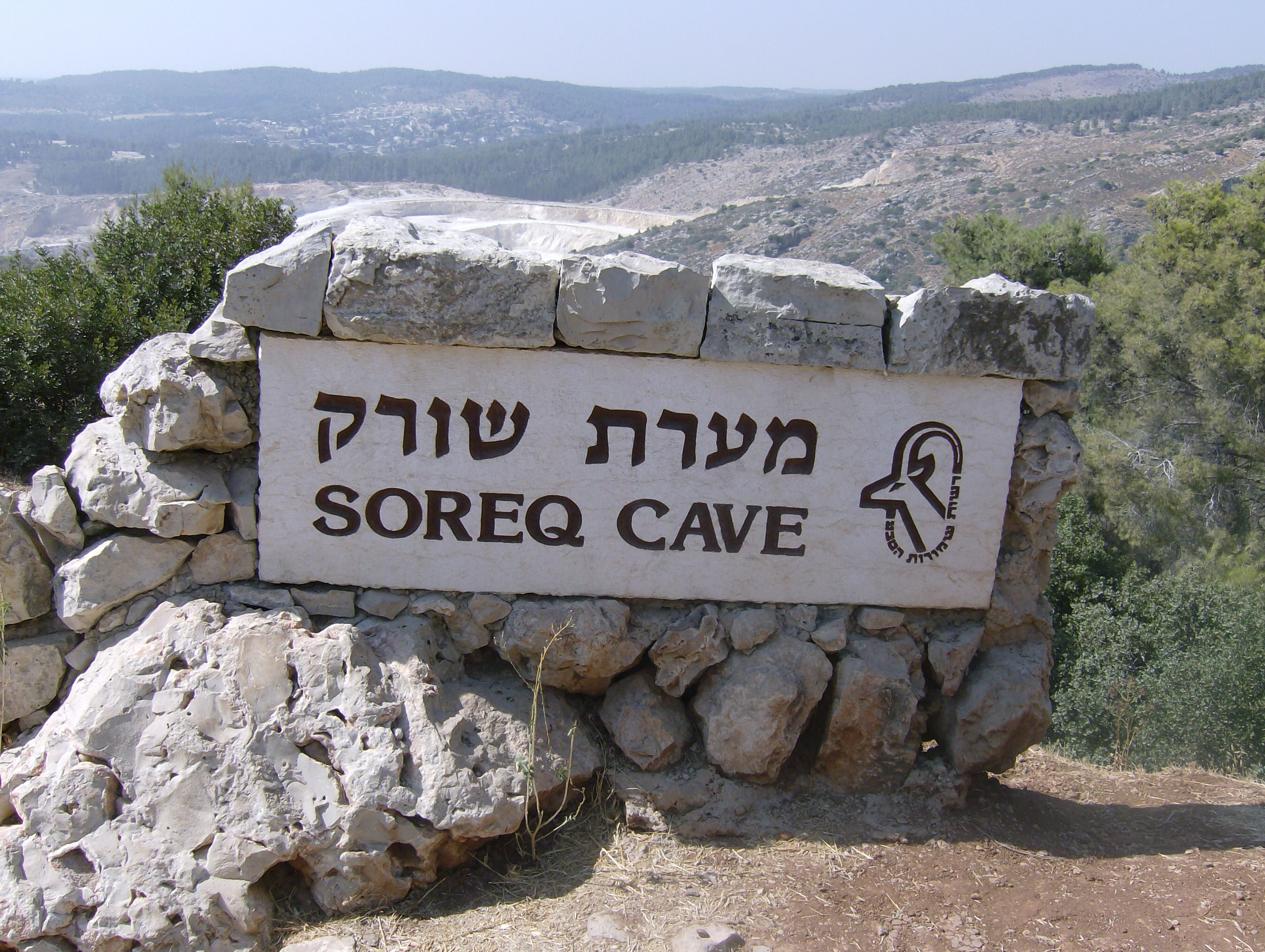
Sign at entrance to the cave

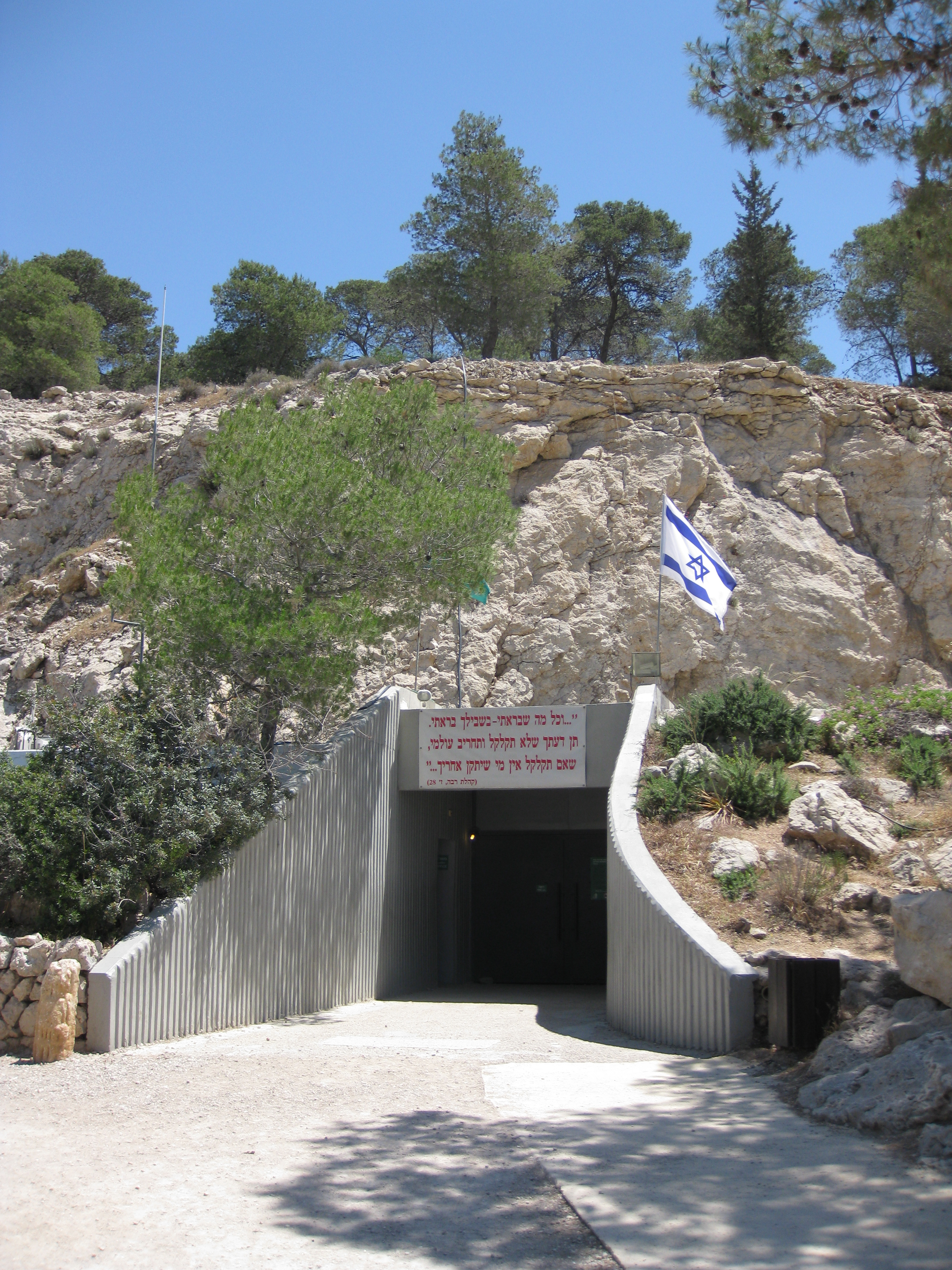
Cave entrance

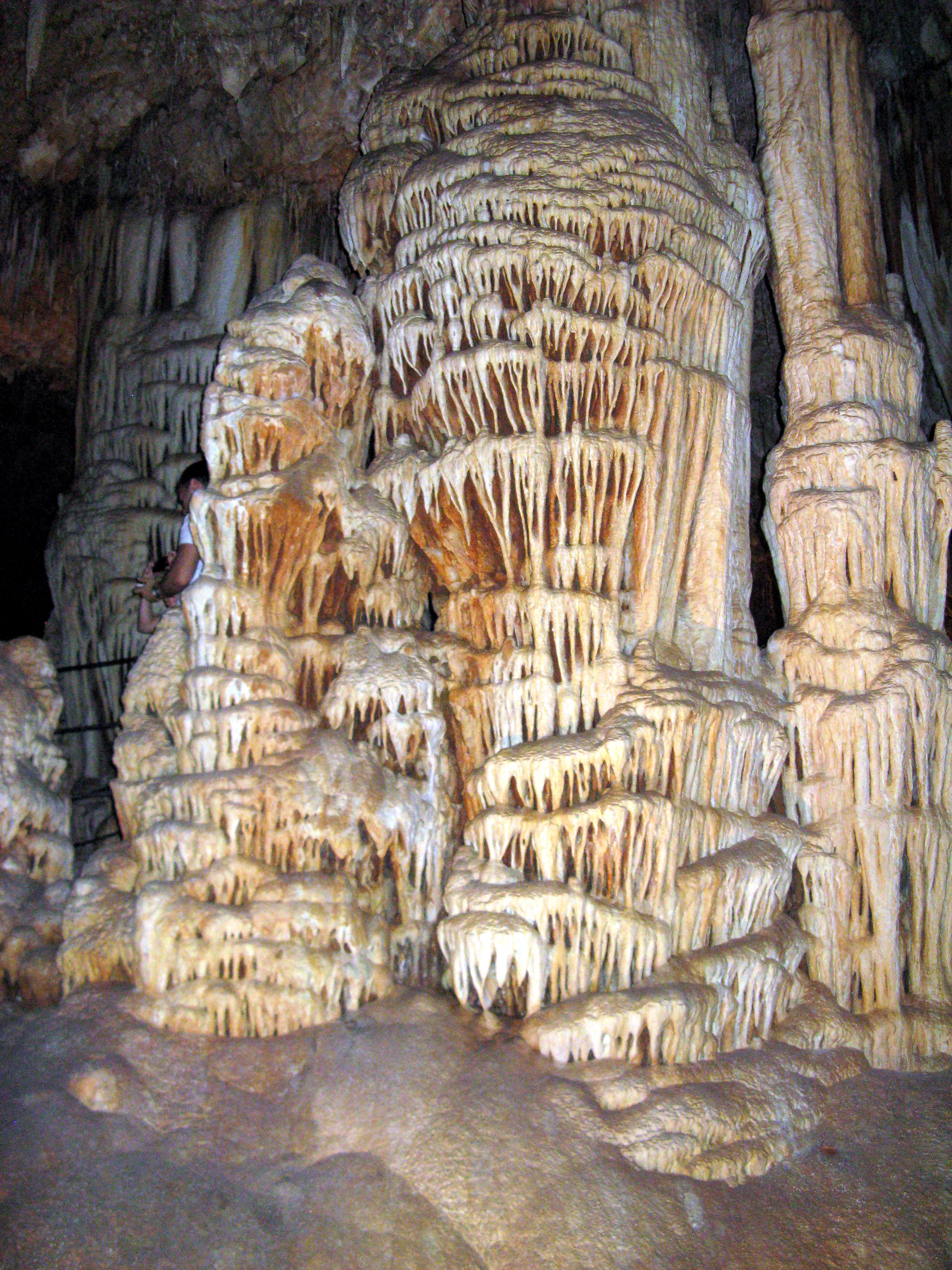
Speleothems

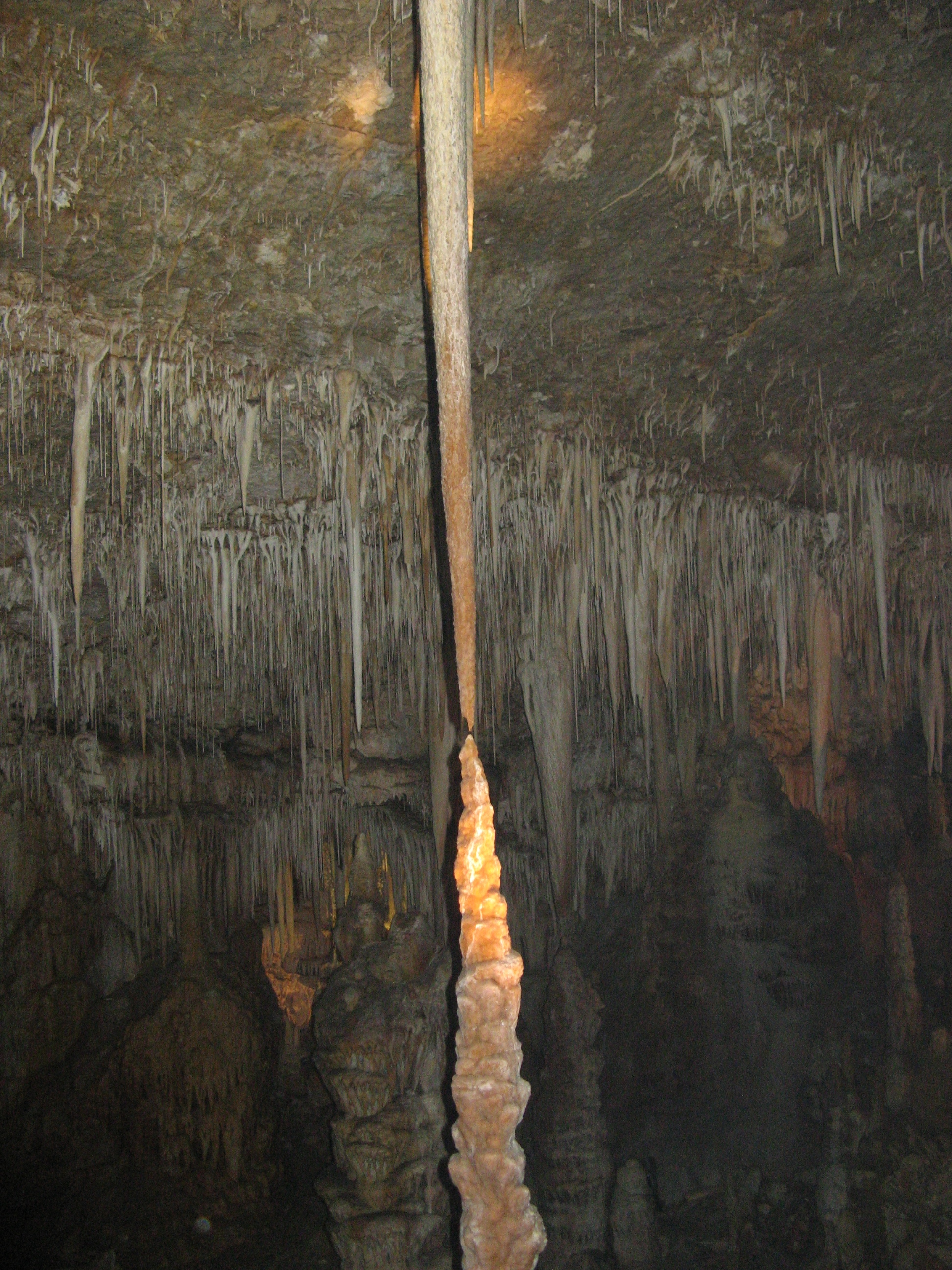
Stalactite meeting stalagmite to form a pillar

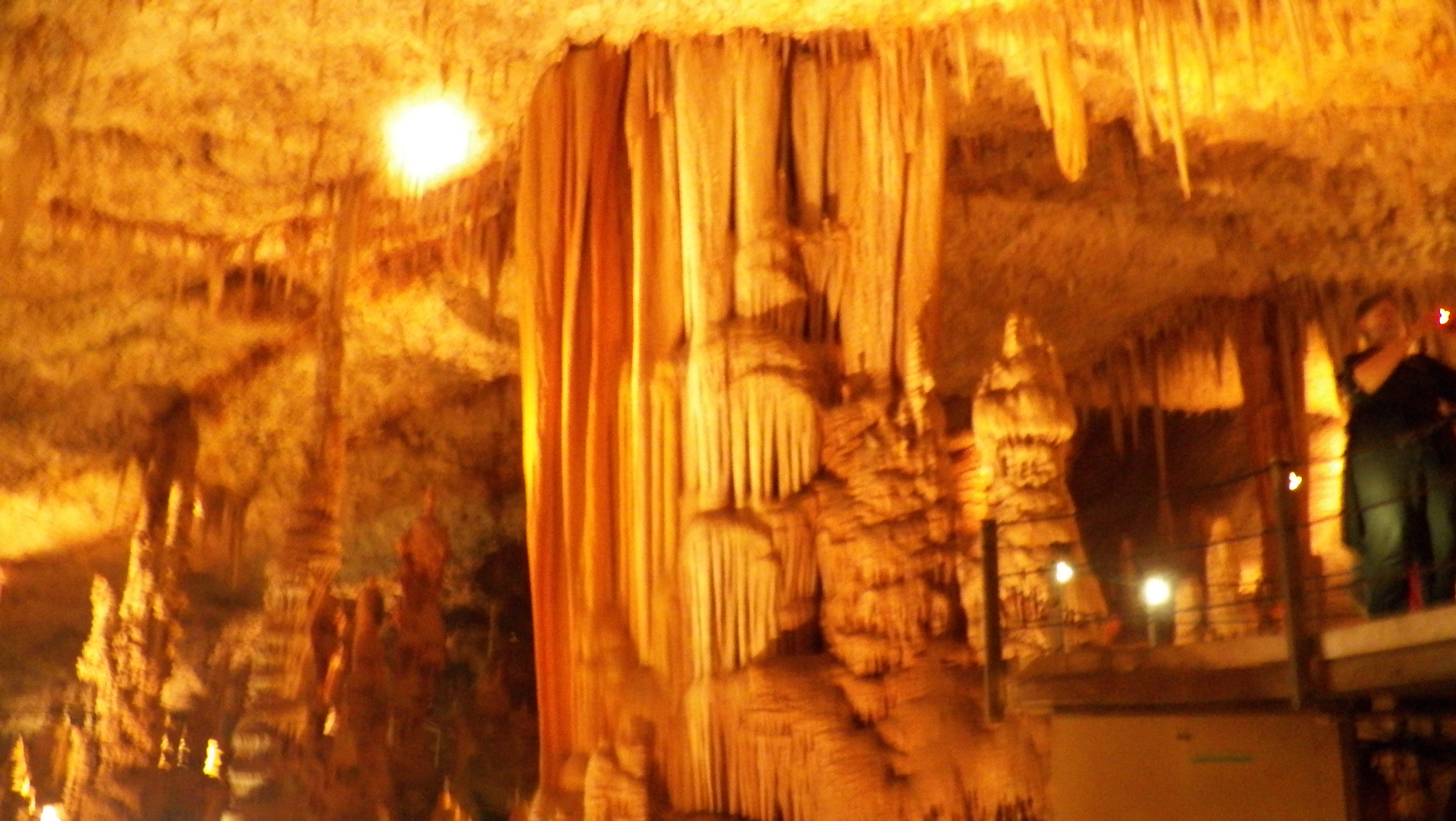
Speleothems

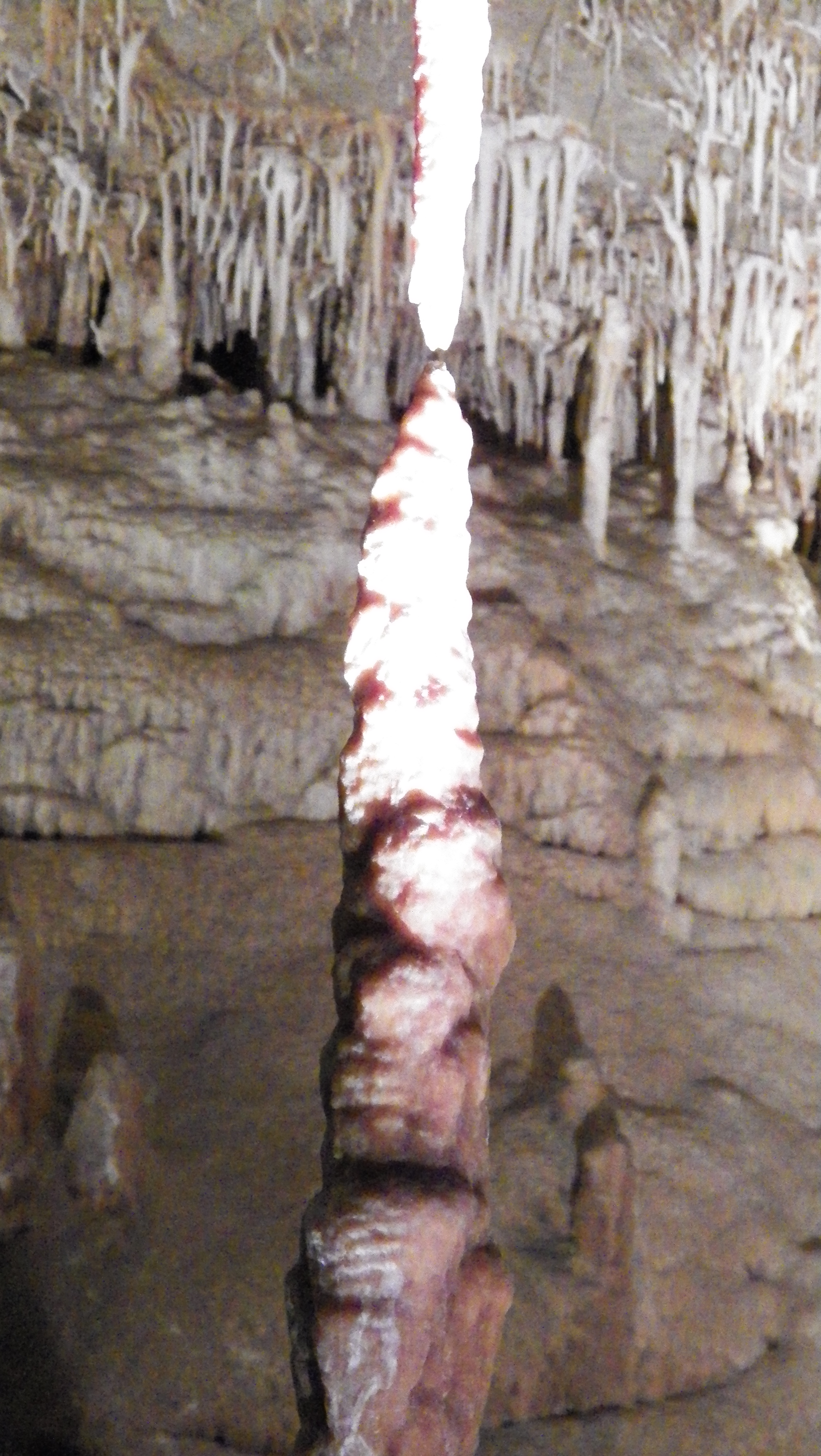
A stalagmite and stalactite almost touch

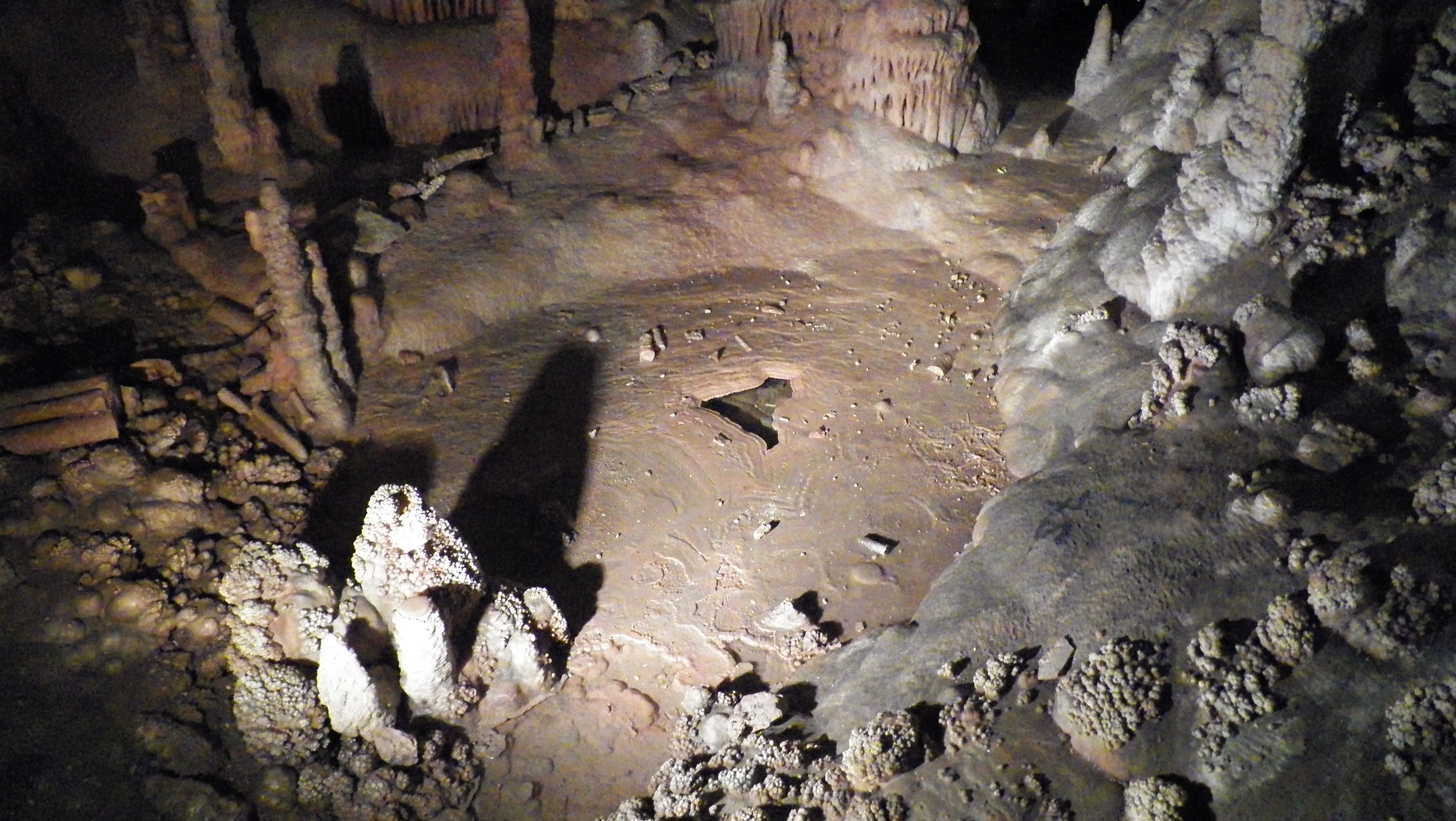
Cave pond almost covered over by calcareous sinter

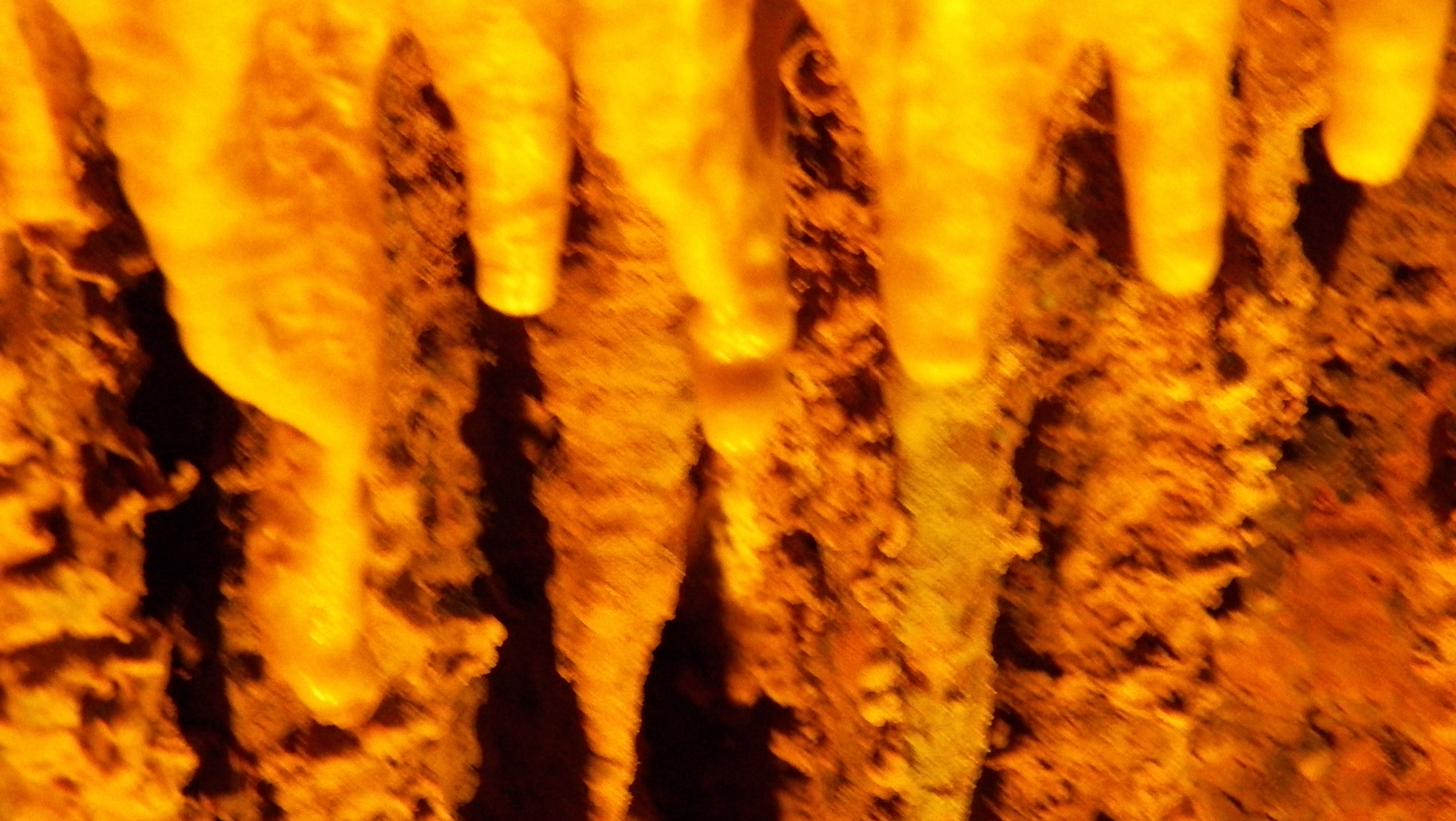
Cave formation

== See also ==
- Geography of Israel
- Tourism in Israel
