= Khirbet Jamjum =

Archeological site located at the western part of Gush Etzion

- Khirbet Jamjum
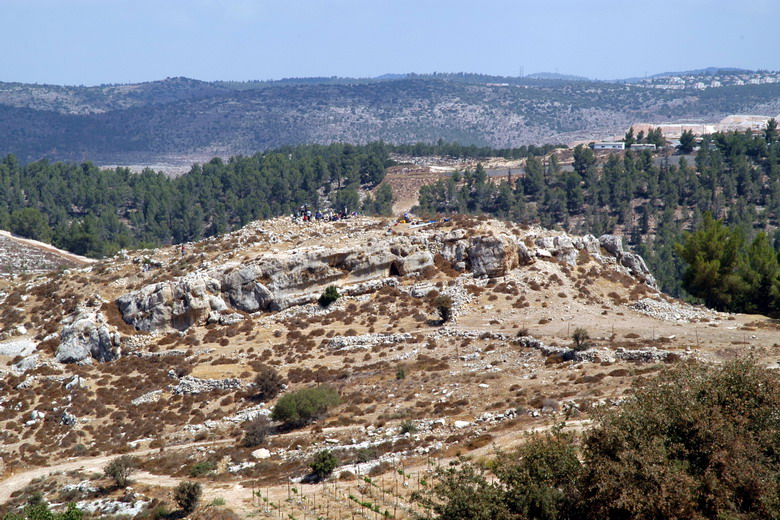
- Interactive map of Khirbet Jamjum
- 31°40′08″N 35°06′05.7″E
- Type: settlement
- Periods: Main periods: Hasmonean, Roman, Byzantine, and Mamluk; Additional activity: Continued sporadically into the Ottoman period
- Location: West Bank
- Region: Judea (historical); Hebron Hills

History
- Built: 2nd century BCE

Site notes
- Condition: In ruins

Khirbet Jamjum is an archaeological site located in the western Hebron Hills of the modern-day West Bank. The settlement occupies the summit and southern saddle of a prominent limestone ridge. The ruin preserves remains of a rural settlement occupied during several periods. Surveys and excavations have revealed several structures, rock-cut installations, water systems, and multiple facilities.

The site appears to have originated during the Hasmonean period, and experienced its most substantial occupation from this time, throughout the Roman period, and up until the early Byzantine period, with renewed activity in the Mamluk era. Additional remains indicate intermittent use continuing into the Ottoman period. During its early phases, the site was likely inhabited by a Jewish population, though it may have been destroyed during the Bar Kokhba Revolt (132–136 CE), and the identity of its later inhabitants remains uncertain. Finds include ritual baths (mik'vaot), storage and refuge complexes, rock-cut tombs, a late-Roman/Byzantine pottery workshop, and a Mamluk-era vaulted structure.

== Location ==
The ruin sits atop a hill in the Hebron Hills, in the southern West Bank. Nearby inhabited areas include the Israeli settlements of Gevaot and Bat Ayin, as well as the Palestinian village of Jab'a. The hill is bordered by steep valleys on three sides and by an east-facing escarpment above a narrow saddle.

== Research History ==
The site was first surveyed in the 1990s by archaeologists David Amit and Boaz Zissu. Two excavations were subsequently carried out in the 2000s. The first, in 2005, was directed by Ahiya Kohen-Tavor on behalf of the Institute of Archaeology at the Hebrew University of Jerusalem. The second, in 2008, was headed by Aren Maeir and Boaz Zissu of the Department of Archaeology at Bar-Ilan University.

== Description ==
The site appears to have been a planned, compact village that covered roughly 10 dunams, including 7 on the summit and 3 on the southeastern saddle. Numerous wall stubs, some built of dressed stones, suggest multi-room domestic units and at least one possible public building. Later, terraces were built across the ruins for agricultural activities.

Inhabitation at the site appears to have begun in the second half of the second century BCE, when the region was part of Hasmonean Judea, and continued intermittently until the Ottoman period. Evidence suggests that substantial occupation occurred primarily between the Hasmonean period and the early Byzantine era, and then again during the Mamluk period. Findings from the early phases indicate that Khirbet Jamjum was a Jewish settlement, featuring Jewish ritual baths (mik'vaot), kokhim tombs, and fortification-like elements. The identity of the inhabitants after the Bar Kokhba revolt—when the site may have been among the villages destroyed by the Romans and later resettled—remains uncertain.

In the Late Roman/Early Byzantine period, the site hosted a pottery production complex alongside rural habitation. During the Mamluk period, a vaulted structure was constructed on the summit.

=== Water systems ===
The site contains an unusually large concentration of water systems, including rectangular plastered cisterns similar to those found in Second Temple-era fortresses in the Judaean Desert and others in ancient settlement sites in the Judaean Mountains. Additionally, two stepped, plastered installations were found, and are believed to be mik'vaot. One of these baths was later converted into a refuse pit, into which broken vessels were discarded.

During the 1948 Palestine war, members of the now-depopulated Jewish kibbutz Masuot Yitzhak used one of the cisterns as an arms cache.

=== Underground complexes and fortifications ===
Additionally, several underground systems were documented. Among them are large caves connected by narrow crawl-spaces which were probably used for storage or refuge (resembling Bar Kokhba refuge caves and also featuring pottery from the revolt period), and a columbarium (dovecote) cave on the northeastern slopes. In addition, an underground hall was found, featuring an entrance shaft sealed in antiquity, later accessible via the hillside. Finds included an ossuary fragment, a large stone basin, and a small olive-oil extraction installation (a bodeda).

South of the summit, a long retaining wall dating to the first century CE was uncovered.

=== Burial caves ===
East of the saddle several burial caves were found: one of them features kokhim, indicating Second Temple-era Jewish burial, while another features arcosolia, pointing to a date in the Late Roman/Byzantine period.

=== Pottery workshop ===
A pottery kiln was discovered at the site, seemingly dating from the 3rd and 4th centuries CE. It was found preserved in its lower half. Fragments of over-fired vessels were found there, alongside misfired pieces, unbaked clay items, and stones burned at high temperature.

=== Mamluk-era structure ===
On the summit, a structure was found, consisting of two barrel-vaulted rooms whose arches were supported by massive walls and a central partition. The building appears to date to the Mamluk period, based on ceramic evidence. It collapsed graudally rather than violently, as no signs of destruction by fire were found. Its function remains uncertain, though its prominent location suggests a communal or administrative use. Beneath the floors was an entrance shaft into an earlier subterranean system which was sealed when the vaulted structure was built.

=== Other finds ===
A bronze mirror-handle fitting, showing the figures of deities Serapis and Isis, was found deliberately defaced, paralleling finds from other hideout systems in Judea.

== See also ==
- Artabba
- Horvat Berachot
- Khirbet el-'Ormeh
- Khirbet Kefireh
- Tur Shimon

== Bibliography ==
- Maeir, A. M.; Zissu, Boaz (2010). Billig, M. (ed.). "Archaeological Excavations at Khirbet Jamjum (Gush Etzion): A Fortified Settlement and Remains of Pottery Production from the Roman and Byzantine Periods – 2008 Season". Judea and Samaria Research Studies. 19. R&D Center, Ariel University: 113–124.
- Raviv, Dvir; Ben David, Chaim (2021). "Cassius Dio's figures for the demographic consequences of the Bar Kokhba War: Exaggeration or reliable account?". Journal of Roman Archaeology. 34 (2): 593. doi:10.1017/S1047759421000271. ISSN 1047-7594.
