= Chephirah =

One of four towns named in Joshua 9:17

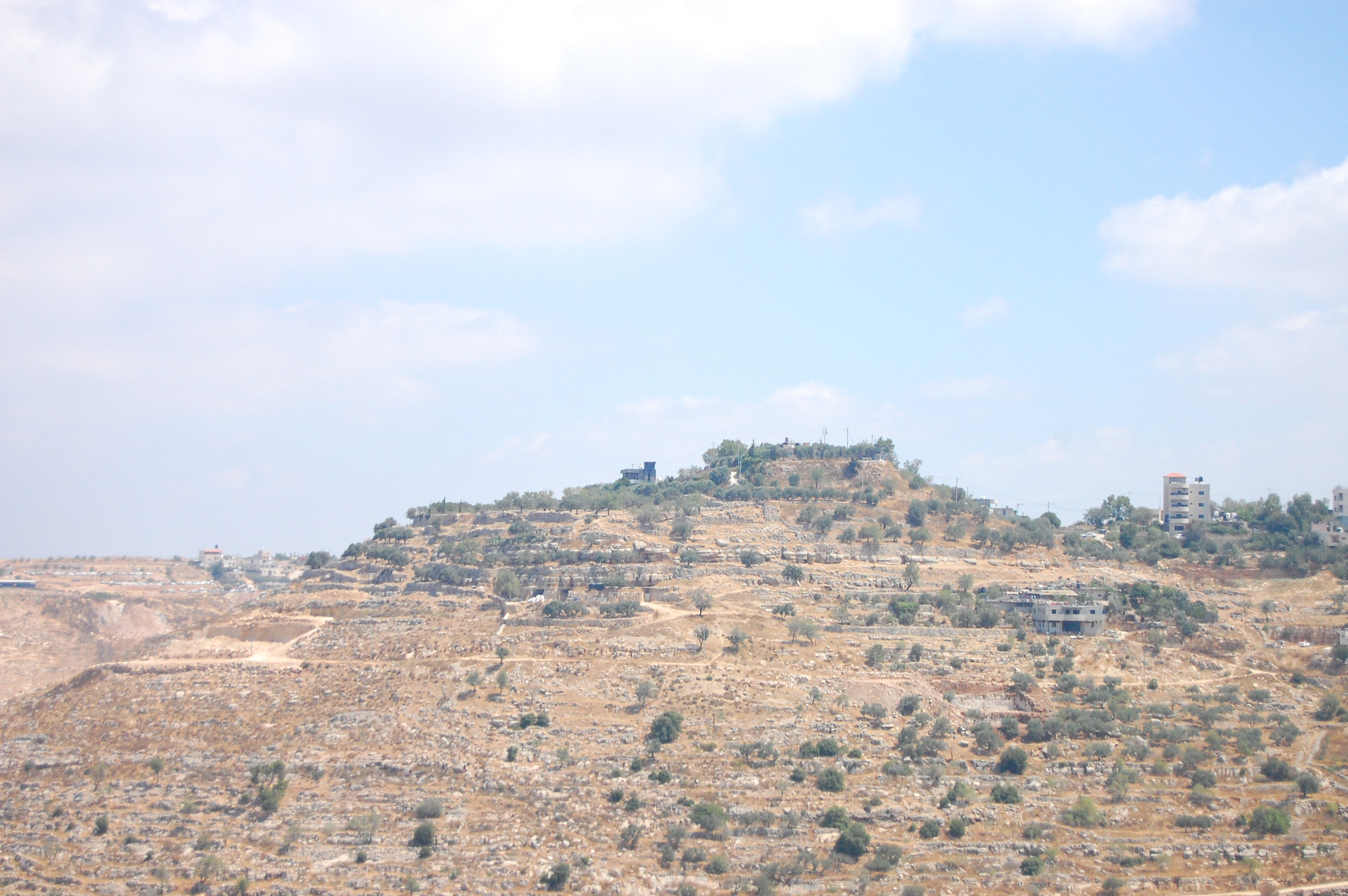
Chephirah

Chephirah is one of four towns named in Joshua 9:17 along with Gibeon, Beeroth, and Kiriath-Jearim. The context is a story explaining a peace treaty between the Israelites and the natives of this region. Chephirah appears again in 18:26 as one of the towns assigned to the Tribe of Benjamin.

No other noteworthy event occurred at Chephirah for hundreds of years until it was named again in the parallel passages of Ezra 2:25, Nehemiah 7:29, and apocryphal 1 Esdras 5:19. Here the context is not of the location, but of the families who formerly resided there prior to being taken captive to Babylon. The people of Chephirah are grouped together with those of Beeroth and Kirjath Jearim, but the Gibeonites comprise a separately numbered family.

The location of Chephirah is now known as Khirbet el-Kafira.

== See also ==
- List of Biblical names that begin with "C"
