= Artabba =

Archaeological site in the central West Bank

- خربة أرطبة (Arabic)
- Khirbet Artabba, Khirbet Atrabbeh
- Aerial view

- Location within the West Bank
- Type: Fortress
- Periods: Hasmonean and Herodian
- Location: Deir Abu Mash'al, West Bank
- Region: Western Bethel Hills, northern Judea (historic)

History
- Built: Mid-2nd century BCE
- Built by: Simon Thassi (according to Dvir Raviv)
- Abandoned: Late 1st century BCE

Site notes
- Elevation: 364 m (1,194 ft)
- Area: 22 dunams (2.2 ha)
- Archaeologists: Dvir Raviv
- Condition: In ruins

Khirbet Artabbeh (Arabic: خربة أرطبة, lit. 'the ruin of Artabbeh'), also known simply as Artabba or Artabbeh, is an archaeological site in the central West Bank, southeast of Deir Abu Mash'al. The site comprises the remains of a Hasmonean-Herodian fortress, an adjacent ruin, and a spring. Archaeological evidence dates the fort's establishment to the mid-2nd century BCE, and indicates that it remained in use until the late 1st century BCE. Archaeologist Dvir Raviv has proposed that the fortress was established under Hasmonean leader Simon Thassi in connection with the consolidation of Judea's northern frontier.

== Name ==
According to Edward Henry Palmer, the name Artabbeh may derive from the Arabic word raṭb (رطب), meaning "moist, fresh". The ancient name of the site is unknown, and several identifications have been proposed. Dvir Raviv considers Arbel (Hebrew: ארבל), a place listed in the later rabbinic work Midrash Vayisau among the fortified sites associated with the sons of Jacob, a possible candidate, citing the phonetic resemblance, the site's proximity to Thamna (identified with the nearby Khirbet Tibnah), and the presence of fortifications. He also points to 1 Maccabees 9:2, which mentions an Arbel in the account of Bacchides's campaign during the Maccabean Revolt. While this place is usually identified in Galilee, Raviv relies on a proposal by Bezalel Bar-Kochva to locate it in the Bethel highlands. As a more tentative alternative he suggests Ga'ash (Hebrew: געש), a stronghold known from later Jewish sources, associated with Thamna and Eilon (identified with the nearby Beitilu).

== Geography ==
Map showing the hilltop fortress, nearby ruins, the spring, and the riverbed

The fortress stands on a hilltop about 364 m (1,194 ft) above sea level in the western Bethel Hills of the central West Bank, with the village of Deir Abu Mash'al about 1 km (0.62 mi) to the northwest. The summit covers about 22 dunams (2.2 ha) and is bounded by steep slopes on the east, north and west, where the riverbed of Wadi Artabba/Nahal Natuf cuts around its base. In antiquity, the fertile Natuf Valley also provided a convenient route between the central Bethel Hills and the Modi'in region. Despite commanding the immediate area, the hill is difficult to distinguish from a distance.

The spring of 'Ein Artabba lies about 200 m (660 ft) to the west, and a larger group of springs about 2 km to the east. Khirbet Artabbeh, a ruin of about 20 dunams (2.0 ha), lies at the southwestern foot of the hill.

== Archaeology ==
The site contains defensive walls, with sections of the perimeter preserved in three parts of the summit. The most substantial remains were recorded near the southwestern corner, where two walls meet at a right angle and may represent a corner of the fortification or part of a square tower. The best-preserved masonry stands about 2.5 m (8.2 ft) high and consists of large ashlar blocks, many with drafted margins and projecting central bosses, laid in alternating headers and stretchers. This style is attested in Hasmonean constructions at Jerusalem, Samaria, Alexandrium (Sartaba) and Khirbet el-'Ormeh.

Ashlar blocks with drafted margins and layout characteristic of Hasmonean construction

Architectural material found at the site includes dressed stones and parts of a column. A decorated stone fragment recovered from a cistern preserves elements of an Ionic entablature, comparable to Herodian palatial constructions at Jericho, Masada and Machaerus.

Five large rock-cut cisterns with an estimated combined capacity of more than 3,400 cubic meters have been documented on the summit. Their walls and floors were coated with hydraulic plaster of types dated to the late Hellenistic and Herodian periods, and they appear to have relied largely on surface runoff. Comparable cisterns are known at Alexandrium, Cypros, Hyrcania, Machaerus and Masada. Taken together, these features appear to support a Hasmonean date of construction, with one cistern possibly a later Herodian addition.

Entablature dated to the Herodian period

Two mikva'ot (Jewish ritual baths) were found at the site; one, later incorporated into a cistern, may date to the Hasmonean period. The slopes around the sites contain numerous rock-cut installations, including caves, cisterns, quarries, storage facilities, and structural remains. Nearby, rock-cut tombs with kokhim, typical of Jewish burial practices during the late Second Temple period, were found. Two of the tombs contained fragments of ossuaries, one of which featured a red rosette. Another tomb features an arcosolium.

Pottery exposed on the fortress hill includes Hellenistic and early Roman material. Among the most identifiable forms are jars with parallels dated to the mid-2nd century BCE in Jerusalem's Jewish Quarter and at Mazor-El'ad. Earlier surveys by Israel Finkelstein and his team also recovered Hellenistic and Roman pottery from the nearby Khirbet Artabba.

== Historical interpretation ==
Raviv dates the fort's establishment to the Hasmonean period, during the mid-2nd century BCE, and its final occupation in the Herodian period, during the late-1st century BCE. He attributes its construction to Simon Thassi, High Priest and Hasmonean ruler from 142 to 135/134 BCE. A few years before Simon rose to power, his brother and predecessor Jonathan Apphus was granted three districts transferred from Samaria to Judea, among them the district of Ramathaim, which Raviv considers to include the area of Artabba. Ancient sources associate Simon with fortification activity at Beth-zur, Jaffa, Gezer, Hadid and Jerusalem, and Raviv suggests that this program may have included Artabba as well.

View

Raviv suggests that Artabba and Hadid may both have been part of a network established to strengthen the Hasmonean hold on northern Judea. Alternatively, Raviv suggests that Artabba formed part of a chain of Hasmonean fortifications along the western slopes of the Judaean Mountains, which may have included Khirbet Tura, Khirbet Jamjum, Khirbet Kefireh and others. During the Herodian period, a monumental structure was constructed at the fortress. Raviv suggests it may have been a palace associated with Herod or a royal estate belonging to someone in his circle.

== Research history ==
The toponym appears on the late 19th-century Survey of Western Palestine (SWP) map, produced by the Palestine Exploration Fund. In their account of the map survey, C. R. Conder and H. H. Kitchener recorded "traces of ruins" at the site. According to Raviv, the SWP map places Khŭrbet Artabba on the hilltop, whereas maps from the British Mandate period and later Israeli maps place it to the southeast. The site remained largely unstudied until modern agricultural development by residents of the nearby village. The use of heavy machinery reportedly exposed some of the site's remains, and the site has also suffered from archaeological looting.

Cistern

Archaeologist Dvir Raviv of the Bar-Ilan University surveyed the site in 2015 as part of his doctoral research on Second Temple-period settlement in the historical regions of southern Samaria and northern Judea.

== See also ==
- Hasmonean Judea#Military
- Khirbet esh-Shuna

== Bibliography ==
=== Sources ===
- Conder, Claude Reignier; Kitchener, Horatio Herbert (1882). Palmer, Edward Henry; Besant, Walter (eds.). The Survey of Western Palestine: Memoirs of the Topography, Orography, Hydrography, and Archæology. Vol. II. London: Committee of the Palestine Exploration Fund. p. 327.
- Palmer, Edward Henry (1881). The Survey of Western Palestine: Arabic and English Name Lists. London: Committee of the Palestine Exploration Fund. pp. 221, 232.
- Raviv, Dvir (2018). "The Artabba Fortress: An Unknown Hasmonaean-Herodian Fortress on the Northern Border of Judaea". Israel Exploration Journal. 68 (1): 56–76. JSTOR 26740637.
