= Khirbet Kefireh =

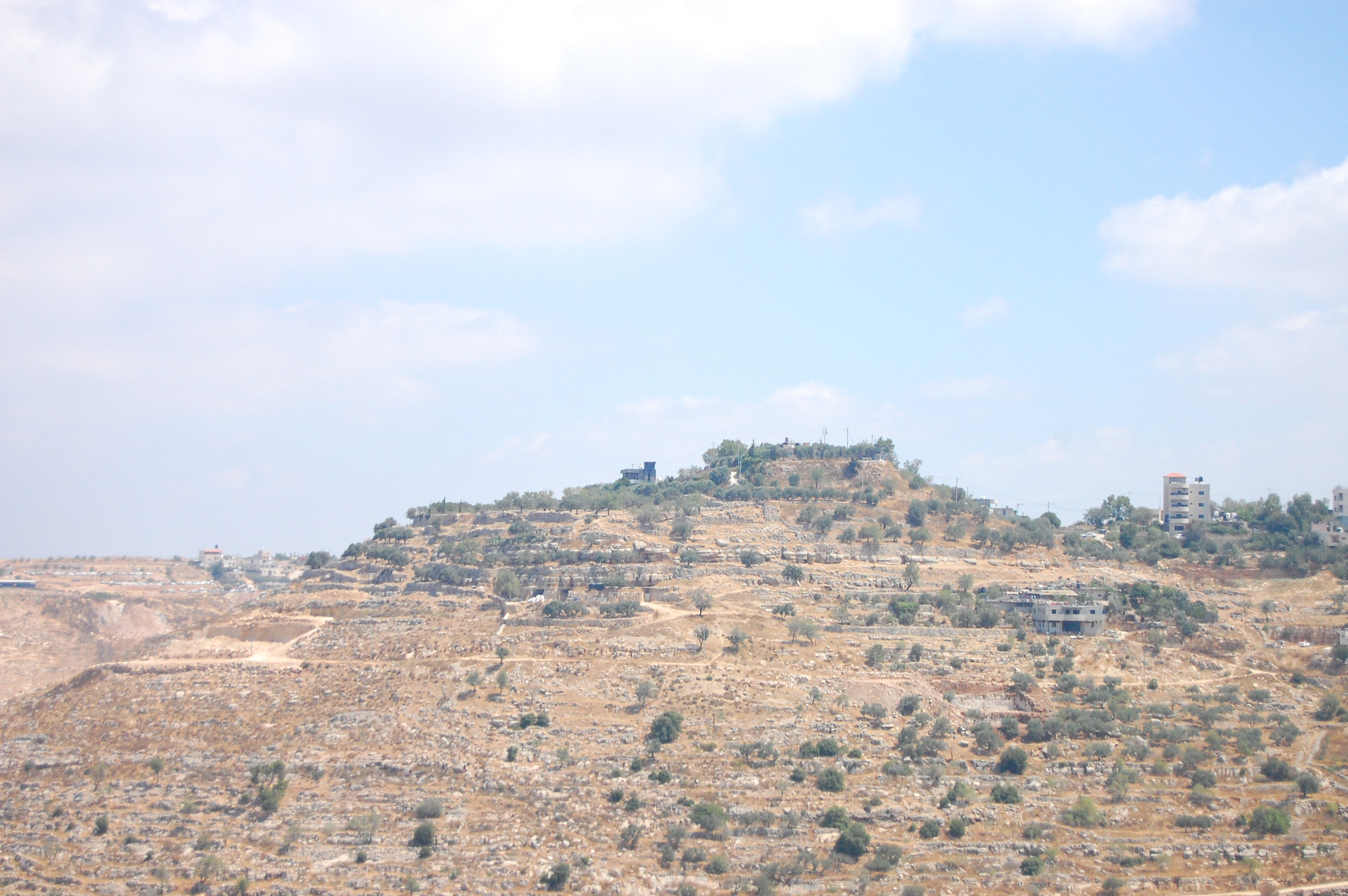
- Khirbet Kefireh (2021)

- Location within State of Palestine
- 31.8309°N 35.106769°E
- Location: Palestine

Khirbet Kefireh, also Khirbet Kefire, Khirbet el-Kefirah, is an archeological site just north of the Palestinian town of Qatanna, West Bank. It is situated atop a hill covering about 4-5 acres. It appears in the Survey of Western Palestine map compiled in the 1870s, and most Bible dictionaries identify it with the ancient town of Chephirah.

Dutch archaeologist Karel J.H. Vriezen extensively surveyed the site during September 1970, June and July 1973, and again in March and July 1974. The site contains two major sections: an upper citadel on the east side near its elevation peak (774 m), and a lower village on the west side. Additionally, three graves were examined about 150 meters to the northeast of the site.

Vriezen found evidence for major architectural changes dating to the Iron-II and Byzantine eras, and pottery shards spanning the Early Bronze, Iron I, Iron II, Hellenistic, Roman, and Byzantine periods. Highlights include a jar handle bearing a LMLK seal impression, and another handle bearing a pre-fired plus (+) mark.

The walls of the site included nine towers and three gates. A cistern and a quarry were found enclosed within the city walls.

Site plan

Excavations are no longer possible due to the presence of modern habitations.

== See also ==
- Biblical archaeology
- Artabba
- Gibeon
- Khirbet Jamjum
