= Horvat Berachot =

Archaeological site in the central West Bank

Horvat Berachot, Khirbet Breikut
- Location within the West Bank
- 31°38′37″N 35°08′38″E
- Type: Settlement, hiding complexes, church
- Periods: Second Temple; Late Roman; Byzantine; Early Islamic period
- Cultures: Second Temple Judaism; Byzantine culture; Islamic culture
- Location: Near Migdal Oz and Kfar Etzion, West Bank
- Region: Judea (historical); Northern Hebron Hills
- Palestine grid: 163/116

History
- Built: 1st/2nd century CE (hiding complexes); 4th century CE (cave-chapel); second half of the 5th century CE (church)
- Abandoned: Late 6th or early 7th century CE

Site notes
- Height: 945 m (3,100 ft) above sea level
- Area: 45 dunams (4.14 ha, 10.22 acres)
- Excavation dates: 1976, 1980, 2020
- Archaeologists: Yoram Tsafrir, Yizhar Hirschfeld, David Amit, Rachel Hachlili, Dvir Raviv and Haim Shkolnik
- Condition: In ruins; mosaics preserved at the Inn of the Good Samaritan

Horvat Berachot or Khirbet Breikut (also Khirbet Bureikut) is an archaeological site located in the Israeli settlement of Migdal Oz in the central West Bank. It is home to a 6th-century Byzantine-era basilical church with a prayer hall, crypt, and atrium surrounded by rooms. Earlier remains include hiding complexes cut during the Jewish–Roman wars and a Bar Kokhba coin.

The church is notable for its mosaic floors which feature geometric designs and animal medallions depicting lions, birds and a wild ox. The church was abandoned during the early Muslim period and reused for domestic or storage purposes. During this period, a Kufic inscription was written on its southern wall. The mosaic floors are today on display at the Israel Museum and the Inn of the Good Samaritan.

== Location ==
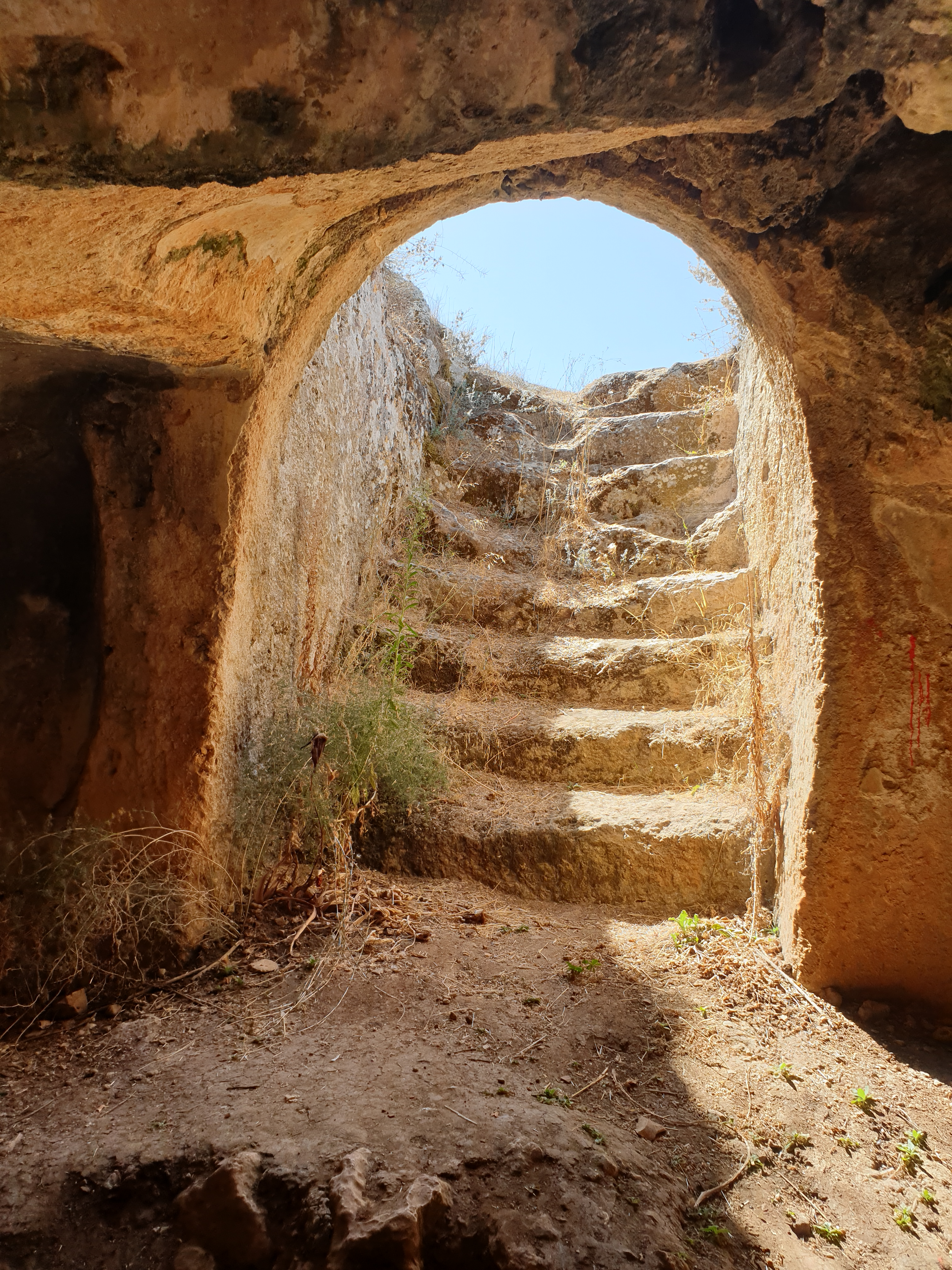
Mikveh (Jewish ritual bath)

The ruin is situated on a wide hill and its slopes, inside the Israeli settlement of Migdal Oz. It is located near the ancient Hebron–Bethlehem road, approximately 3 kilometres (1.9 mi) east of Kfar Etzion. The archaeological site's location within an Israeli settlement limits access to the site for Palestinian people.

== Archaeology ==
Horvat Berachot contains remains dating from the Second Temple, Late Roman, Byzantine, and early Islamic periods.

Two hiding complexes were discovered at the site. Both have entrances concealed within caves, a feature shared with many hiding complexes in the Shephelah (Judaean Lowlands) and with another nearby at Al-Arroub. The earliest finds in them are ceramics dating from the first and second centuries CE, including limestone examples, which were typical containers that fell out of use after the Jewish–Roman wars. The architecture of one complex, 43 metres (141 ft) long, suggests it was built in preparation for the Bar Kokhba Revolt (132–136 CE), or possibly earlier, during the First Jewish–Roman War (66–73 CE).

A Bar Kokhba coin dating to the revolt's second year (132/133 CE) was found in a large Persian/early Hellenistic structure. The obverse features the Hebrew name שמע[ון] (Sim'on, in reference to Simon bar Kokhba) alongside a palm tree, while the reverse bears the Hebrew word ישראל (Israel) with a vine leaf.

== Church ==
Khirbet Breikut is home to a Byzantine-era basilica comprising a prayer hall, a crypt, and an atrium surrounded by rooms. It measures approximately 15.5 metres (51 ft) by 12.5 metres (41 ft). Built directly on bedrock, it had walls about 70 centimetres (2.3 ft) thick, constructed of large stones with some exceeding a 1 metre (3.3 ft) in length. The stones were roughly worked on their inner faces, while the outer faces were generally dressed with marginal drafting around a projecting central boss. The inner faces of the walls were coated with white plaster. Because the ground slopes eastward, the eastern end required additional fill and construction to bring its floor to the level of the rest of the building.

The church was probably abandoned in the late 6th or early 7th century and was subsequently converted into a dwelling or storage space as indicated by partition walls built inside it; this phase is primarily from the 8th century CE. Most of the structure's stones and architectural elements were eventually stolen, and agricultural works further damaged the site, especially its mosaics. The outer walls survive to a height of about 2 metres (6.6 ft) in only a few places, mainly along the eastern slope. The ruins are overgrown and have been damaged by erosion.

=== Structure ===
The church had a nearly square prayer hall divided by two rows of columns into a nave and two aisles. Each row had three stone column bases set in the stylobate, along with a half-column base attached to the west wall; no column shafts were found. Only the foundations of the eastern end survive, so its reconstruction depends largely on a single apse stone. Triangular black-stone tiles found nearby may have formed an opus sectile pavement for a bema in the apse. The collapse of the crypt vault apparently brought down the bema and probably the apse, after which the remaining stones were removed for reuse.

A narthex extended across the entire west side of the hall. It had three openings from the atrium, with the central opening directly opposite the hall's main entrance, and another opening leading south into a large room with a mosaic floor. Its floor was white with a black border and decorated with rows of black and red buds.

The western part of the complex comprised an atrium and side rooms that together covered a larger area than the church itself. A large, deep cistern cut into the rock occupied the centre of the atrium and has largely collapsed. Stylobates survive along the north, south and west sides, indicating porticoes about 2 metres (6.6 ft) wide with floors of white mosaic incorporating coarse stones. Rooms adjoined the atrium on the south and west. They may have belonged to a monastery built beside the church.

=== Mosaic floors ===
The prayer hall's mosaic floor comprised three main areas: the nave carpet, the aisle carpets, and the panels between the columns. Only a small section at the western end survives. The nave and intercolumnar panels use finer tesserae, about 160 per square decimetre, than the aisle pavements.

Each intercolumnar panel is divided into three fields. The smaller fields contain nested rhombi shaded to create a three-dimensional effect, while the larger central field contains a rhombus enclosing a symmetrical red running-wave pattern on a white ground. The aisle carpets feature geometric patterns of squares in white, grey, and red. The nave carpet was the principal element of the mosaic floor. Its centre consisted of a network of elongated hexagons with rounded sides, arranged in five rows of six, for a total of 30; only the westernmost row survives. Bands of graduated colour around the hexagons create an illusion of relief. Where the pattern meets the outer frame, the hexagons form semicircles decorated with shell motifs in alternating colour schemes and triangles filled with zigzags.

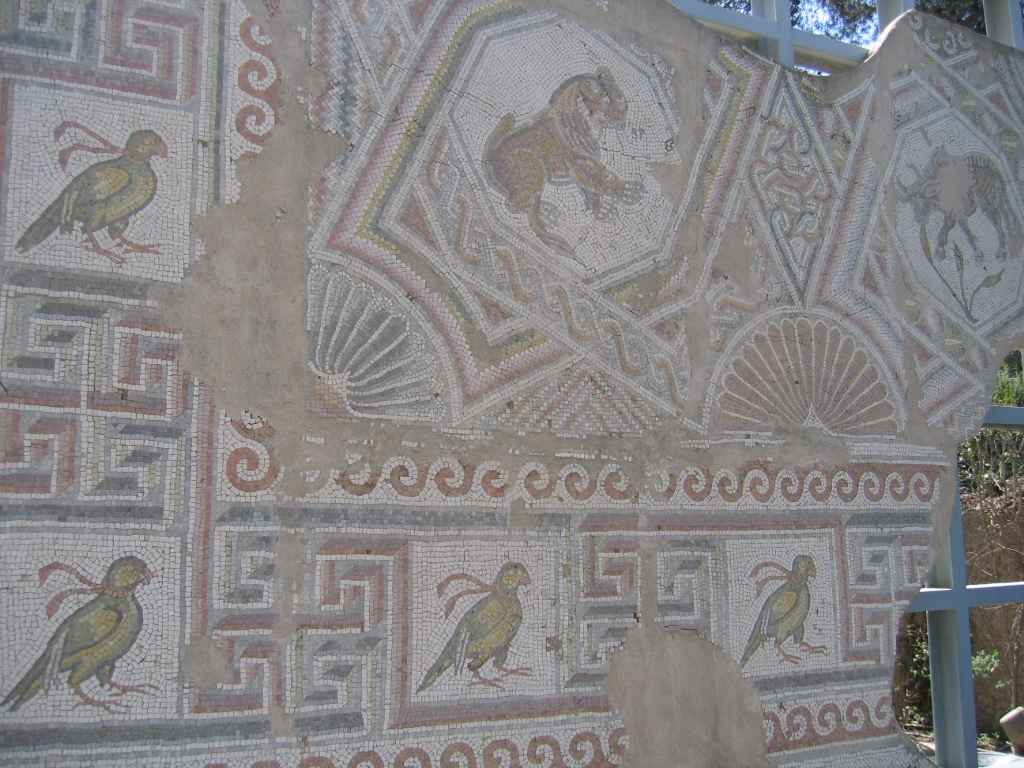
Animal mosaics, Israel Museum

The hexagonal panels contained animal medallions. They include two crouching lions in the side medallions, facing each other toward the centre of the hall, and a wild ox feeding on a plant between them. The outer border featured volutes, while the inner border was composed of square medallions depicting birds, separated by meanders. The lions are shown roaring and apparently poised to spring, and are realistically rendered in multiple colours, though their proportions are imperfect. The excavators found no exact parallel but compare certain features to the lions on the Ma'on synagogue mosaic.

=== Crypt ===
A crypt was discovered beneath the bema at the eastern part of the church. It features a stone lintel with a cross motif. The crypt originated as a natural cave turned chapel; at this stage it had plastered walls and a white mosaic floor. A small plastered grave in the floor contained a secondary burial. Anthropological examination by Joe Zias identified the remains of 11 individuals in total. A nearby clay lamp decorated with a grape cluster and two doves, a type characteristic of the 4th century CE, supports the interpretation that the cave was used for Christian worship by the 4th century CE.

Mosaic floor from the crypt, on display at the Inn of the Good Samaritan

When the church was built, the cave was converted into a crypt accessed by two flights of steps, one from the north and one from the south. The separate entrance and exit have been taken to indicate the movement of pilgrims and processions through the crypt. The excavators compared the arrangement with crypts at the Church of the Nativity in Bethlehem, the Eleona church on the Mount of Olives, the church of St. Elianos at Madaba, and, most closely, the northern church at Rehovot-in-the-Negev (whose crypt the excavators dated to the second half of the 5th century). The columns partly obstructed the stairs leading to the aisles, however, restricting movement within the church. The crypt's mosaic floor is almost intact and is decorated with rows of flowers of various types, using about 60 tesserae per square decimetre. It is today on display at the Inn of the Good Samaritan near Ma'ale Adumim.

During the early Muslim period, the Byzantine floor was covered by a packed floor of reddish earth, containing a few potsherds. A small marble column with a square base, possibly part of an altar, was found above the mosaic. The pottery, including several lamps of types used over an extended period, and the absence of glazed ware indicate an early Muslim date for the occupation. A three-line Muslim inscription in the Kufic script on the southern wall, deciphered by Rina and Yosef Drori, invokes God and asks forgiveness for a man named Yusuf. He may have been an Arab ascetic who lived during the Umayyad period. The inscription suggests that the site's sanctity may have continued to be recognized into the early Muslim period.

== Research history ==
Following the Six-Day War in 1967, Israel occupied the West Bank and the Archaeological Staff Officer of Judea and Samaria assumed control over archaeological sites. The site was excavated in 1976 by an expedition led by Yoram Tsafrir and Yizhar Hirschfeld, along with David Amit, in cooperation with the Kfar Etzion field school, the Archaeological Staff Officer of Judea and Samaria, and the Institute of Archaeology of the Hebrew University of Jerusalem. The excavation was prompted by antiquities looting and was conducted as a salvage excavation. The 1954 Hague Convention for the Protection of Cultural Property in the Event of Armed Conflict prohibits excavations in occupied territories except for salvage excavations. Measurements and reconstruction drawings were prepared by architect Giora Solar.

Salvage work started again in 1980, led by Rachel Hachlili, as part of the expansion of Migdal Oz into the site's area. Two hiding complexes were discovered by Shlomo Ben Shalom and Uzi Kokhva.

In 2020, excavations took place by Dvir Raviv and Haim Shkolnik on behalf of the Staff Officer.

== See also ==
- Horvat Midras
- Khirbet Beit Lei
- Khirbet Beit Sila
- Khirbet el-Lattatin
- Khirbet Jamjum
- Na'aran synagogue

== Bibliography ==
=== Bibliography ===
- Ben Shalom, Shlomo (1983). "מערכות מסתור בחורבת ברכות" [Hiding complexes at Horvat Berachot]. Nikrot Zurim (in Hebrew). 8: 26–35.
- Keinan-Schoonbaert, Adi (2016), "Multiple inventories and divided archaeology in the West Bank: An assessment of databases in the Etzion Bloc", Journal of Field Archaeology, 41 (6): 645–659, doi:10.1080/00934690.2016.1235460
- Magen, Yitzhak (2010). The Good Samaritan Museum. Jerusalem: Staff Officer of Archaeology, Civil Administration of Judea and Samaria, Israel Antiquities Authority. pp. 214–215. ISBN 978-965-406-219-0.
- Magen, Yitzhak; Kagan, Evgeni D. (2012). Malka, Ayelet Hashahar (ed.). Christians and Christianity. Vol. II: Corpus of Christian Sites in Judea. Jerusalem: Staff Officer of Archaeology, Civil Administration of Judea and Samaria, Israel Antiquities Authority. pp. 141–145. ISBN 978-965-406-253-4.
- Merlonghi, Marzia (2025). "Archaeology and shared heritage under occupation: the case of Israel/Palestine". In Sadowski, Mirosław M.; Bonaviri, Gianluigi Mastandrea; Ceccotti, Filippo (eds.). Heritage in War and Peace IV: Selected Strathclyde Papers. University of Strathclyde Publishing. doi:10.17868/strath.00093374. ISBN 978-1-914241-80-2.
- Raviv, Dvir; Zissu, Boaz (2024). "An Update on the Geographical Distribution of the Coins Minted by the Bar Kokhba". Israel Numismatic Research. 19: 71–88.
- Silberman, Neil Asher (2003), "Power, politics and the past: the social construction of antiquity in the Holy Land", in Levy, Thomas E. (ed.), The Archaeology of Society in the Holy Land (2nd; reprint ed.), London and New York: Continuum, pp. 9–23, ISBN 0-8264-6996-5
- Tsafrir, Yoram; Hirschfeld, Yizhar (1978). "כנסייה מן התקופה הביזאנטית בחורבת ברכות" [A Church of the Byzantine Period at Ḥorvat Berachot]. Qadmoniot: A Journal for the Antiquities of Eretz-Israel and Bible Lands (in Hebrew). 11 (4 (44)): 120–128. JSTOR 23674058.
