= Khirbet el-Lattatin =

Ruin in the West Bank

Khirbat el-Latatin
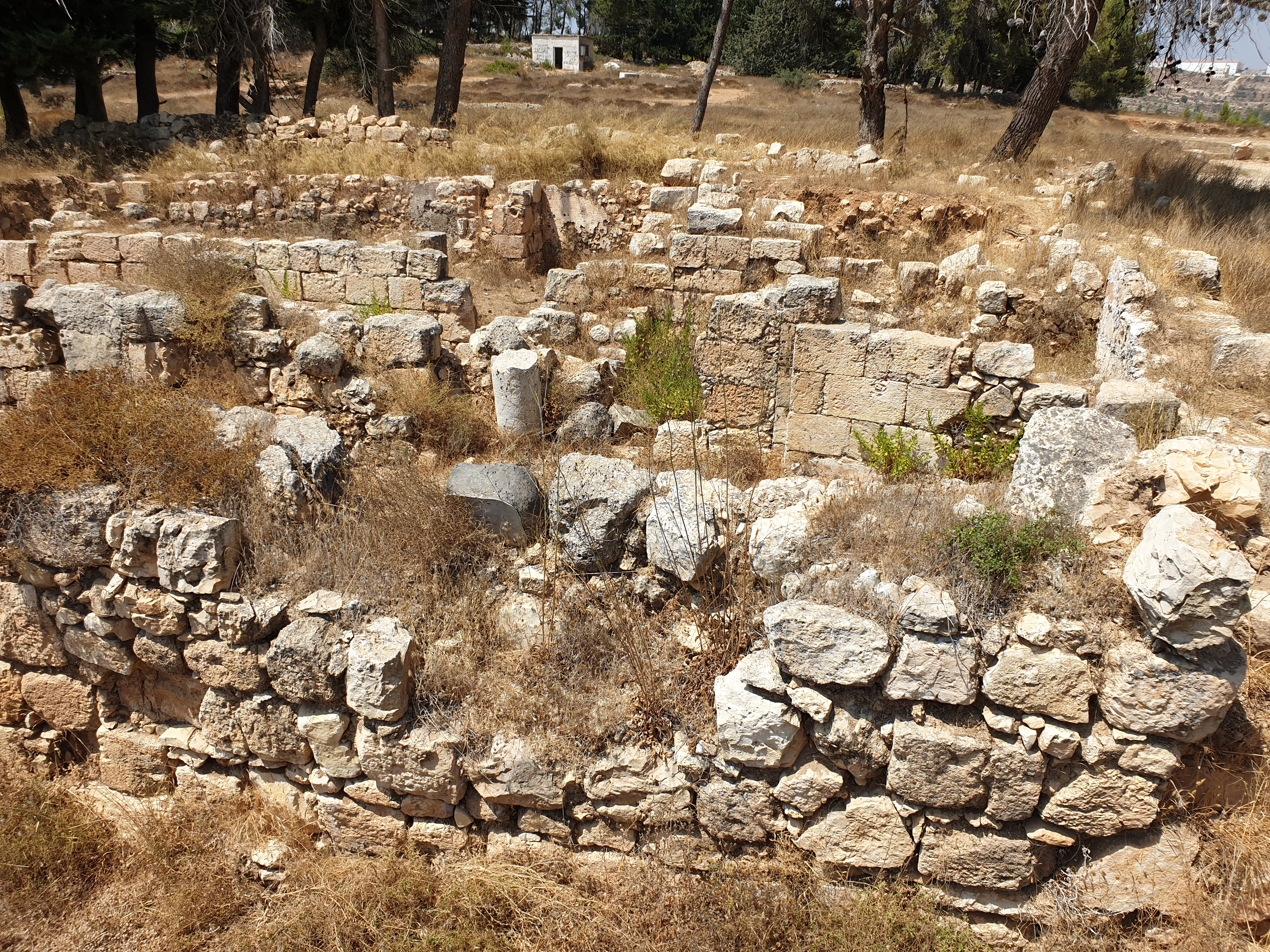
- The ruins in 2020

- Location within the West Bank
- 31°52′08″N 35°10′03″E
- Type: Settlement, church
- Periods: Byzantine period
- Cultures: Second Temple Judaism, Byzantine culture
- Location: West Bank
- Region: Samaria
- Part of: Byzantine period

Site notes
- Height: 760 m (2,490 ft)
- Area: 2 ha (4.9 acres)
- Condition: In ruins; mosaics preserved at Good Samaritan Inn
- Owner: Public
- Public access: Yes

Khirbat el-Latatin (also: Khirbat el-Latatin) is a ruin in the West Bank located about 300 meters north of the Israeli settlement of Givat Ze'ev, north west of Jerusalem, on a hill 760 meters above sea level covering an area of about four dunams.

== The findings on the site ==
Mosaic from Khirbat el-Latatin, Good Samaritan Inn

Archaeological surveys carried out on the site during the Mandatory period uncovered findings from the Second Temple period. In June 1995 excavations were conducted on the site and the remains of a church, a road station, a mosaic floor, and an oil press were found there dating back to the beginning of the 5th century CE.

== Site identification ==
Since the beginning of the 20th century, the site of Kh. El Latatin has been identified with the road station mentioned on the Madaba Map as TO ENNATON (literally: "the ninth"). This is due to a certain preservation of the in the name of the ruins, due to the findings of the road station at the site, and due to the location of the site around the ninth milestone on the Roman road between Jerusalem and Lod, via Bethoron.

According to a minority opinion, the site of the ninth mile mentioned in the Madaba Map refers to the second Roman road that connected Jerusalem to Lod, which passed through Motza (Roman Colonia Amosa), through today's Abu Ghosh and Emmaus.

== See also ==
- Bir ed-Duwali
- Horvat Diab
- Khirbet Beit Sila
- Khirbet al-Biyar
