= Khirbet al-Biyar =

Archaeological site in the central West Bank

- Interactive map of Khirbet al-Biyar
- 31°49′52″N 35°11′56″E
- Type: village
- Periods: Hellenistic, Roman periods (Jewish village); Late Roman, Byzantine, Early Islamic periods (resettled)
- Cultures: Second Temple Judaism
- Location: West Bank
- Region: Judaean Mountains
- Palestine grid: 169/137

History
- Built: 3rd century BCE (Jewish village)
- Abandoned: First Jewish–Roman War

Site notes
- Excavation dates: 2007–2008
- Archaeologists: Zechariah Kallai, Naftali Aizik and Benjamin Har-Even
- Condition: In ruins

Khirbet al-Biyar is an archaeological site located near Beit Hanina, northwest of Jerusalem, at the foot of the Nabi Samwil ridge, in the West Bank. Covering roughly 20 dunams, the site preserves evidence of occupation, though not continuously, from the Iron Age through the Early Islamic period.

Excavations at Khirbet al-Biyar, carried out in the late 2000s, revealed a Jewish village established in the Hellenistic era (3rd century BCE) and continuously occupied until it was abandoned during the First Jewish Revolt of 66–73 CE. The site was resettled on a smaller scale in the 4th–5th centuries CE, in the Late Roman and Byzantine periods, with continued activity after the Muslim conquest.

Among the most notable discoveries is a fragmentary sarcophagus lid bearing the Hebrew inscription "son of the high priest," carved in the distinctive lapidary script of Second Temple–period Jerusalem. The fragment, reused in an Early Islamic installation, likely originated in a nearby Jewish cemetery whose tombs, mainly kokhim-type caves, date to the Second Temple period and were used through the Bar Kokhba revolt. According to the excavators, the inscription and burial evidence suggest that the surrounding area may once have belonged to an elite priestly family—possibly the Beit Hanan clan known from ancient Jewish sources—and that the modern toponym of Beit Hanina preserves their name.

== Geography ==
The site lies half a kilometer west of the village of Beit Hanina and 1.5 km southeast of Nabi Samwil, 7 km north of Jerusalem. It stands at an elevation of 675 meters above sea level, at the foot of a slope descending from the Nabi Samwil ridge. The ancient site covers about 20 dunams and is centered on a large, stone-cleared ruin. In antiquity, it lay close to the road from Hadid to Jericho.

The Tabula Imperii Romani – Iudaea/Palaestina notes a possible identification with Beeroth, a place mentioned in 1 Maccabees and by Eusebius, though it may also be identified with modern Al-Bireh.

== Archaeology ==
=== Settlement ===
Pottery sherds indicate occupation from the Iron Age through to the Early Islamic period. Archaeological excavations at the site uncovered the remains of a Jewish settlement of the Second Temple period, founded in the Hellenistic period in the 3rd century BCE and continuously inhabited until the First Jewish Revolt against Rome, as indicated by a coin from the revolt's second year (67/68 CE) found in one of the structures. The site was then abandoned, probably in connection with the Roman campaign in the area.

In the Late Roman/early Byzantine periods (4th–5th centuries CE), the site was reoccupied as a small rural settlement. Occupation continued in the Early Islamic period, during which a large residential building was constructed that incorporated an olive press.

=== "Son of the High Priest" inscription ===
One of the site's most striking finds was identified as Second Temple-era spolia incorporated into a medieval installation dating from the Early Islamic period: a fragment of a sarcophagus lid looted from the ancient Jewish cemetery. The fragment preserves part of a Hebrew inscription carved in square lapidary script typical of Jerusalem in the Second Temple period, reading "son of the high priest." It was likely once part of a longer epitaph that originally included the deceased's name and his father's name.

The fact that the inscription comes from a sarcophagus, rather than an ossuary (far more common in this period), also points to the deceased's wealth and associates him with an elite able to afford a more costly burial container. The inscription itself is exceptional in the quality of its carving and letter forms. On this basis, the excavators suggested that the high priestly family referenced, serving in the Second Temple, may have held a private estate in the area. They further proposed a toponymic link between the nearby village name Beit Hanina and the high-priestly clan Beit Hanan (also Beit Ḥanin in the Talmud), known from late Second Temple sources; according to this view, the area of present-day Beit Hanina may once have formed part of that family's estate.

== Cemetery ==
West of the site is a large cemetery containing tombs from several periods; one survey counted 49. The great majority—40 caves—belong to the Second Temple period, while nine caves date to the Late Roman and Byzantine periods, reflecting the settlement's scale in each phase. Use of the Second Temple–period cemetery appears to have continued into the time of the Bar Kokhba revolt, as indicated by glass vessels and oil lamps dating to the early 2nd century CE.

Most of the Second Temple–period tombs are of the kokhim type typical of the era, in a relatively simple form, most with arched (vaulted) ceilings, though some have gabled roofs. A number of caves appear particularly early, featuring burial benches rather than kokhim; they may have been hewn at the beginning of the Second Temple period, or even earlier, in the Iron Age. The Late Roman/Byzantine tombs are rock-cut burial caves of the arcosolia type.

== Research history ==
The site was surveyed in the 1968 Emergency Survey by Zecharia Kallai, and again in the 1990s as part of the Benjamin Survey. A further survey was conducted in 2006 by Naftali Aizik and Benjamin Har-Even, during preparations for construction of the West Bank barrier.

In 2007–2008, a salvage excavation was conducted by Naftali Aizik and Benjamin Har-Even on behalf of the Staff Officer for Archaeology in the Civil Administration of the West Bank, due to the construction of the West Bank barrier near Ramot.

== See also ==
- Bir ed-Duwali
- Horvat Diab
- Khirbet Badd 'Isa
- Khirbet el-Lattatin

== Sources ==
- Isaac, Naftali; Har-Even, Benyamin (2011). "Khirbet al-Biyar / חורבת אל-ביאר: נחלת משפחת כהונה גדולה מימי הבית השני". Qadmoniot: A Journal for the Antiquities of Eretz-Israel and Bible Lands / קדמוניות: כתב-עת לעתיקות ארץ-ישראל וארצות המקרא (in Hebrew). מד (142): 78–83. ISSN 0033-4839.
- Giambrone, Anthony (2021). Rethinking the Jewish War: Archeology, Society, Traditions. Études Bibliques. Leuven: Peeters Publishers & Booksellers, ISD Distribution. ISBN 978-90-429-4301-8.
- Tsafrir, Yoram; Di Segni, Leah; Green, Judith (1998) [1994]. Tabula Imperii Romani – Iudaea·Palaestina: Eretz Israel in the Hellenistic, Roman and Byzantine Periods (2nd ed.). Israel Academy of Sciences and Humanities. ISBN 965-208-107-8.
