= Monastery of Martyrius =

Former monastery in the West Bank

Coordinates: 31°46′45.05″N 35°18′01.14″E

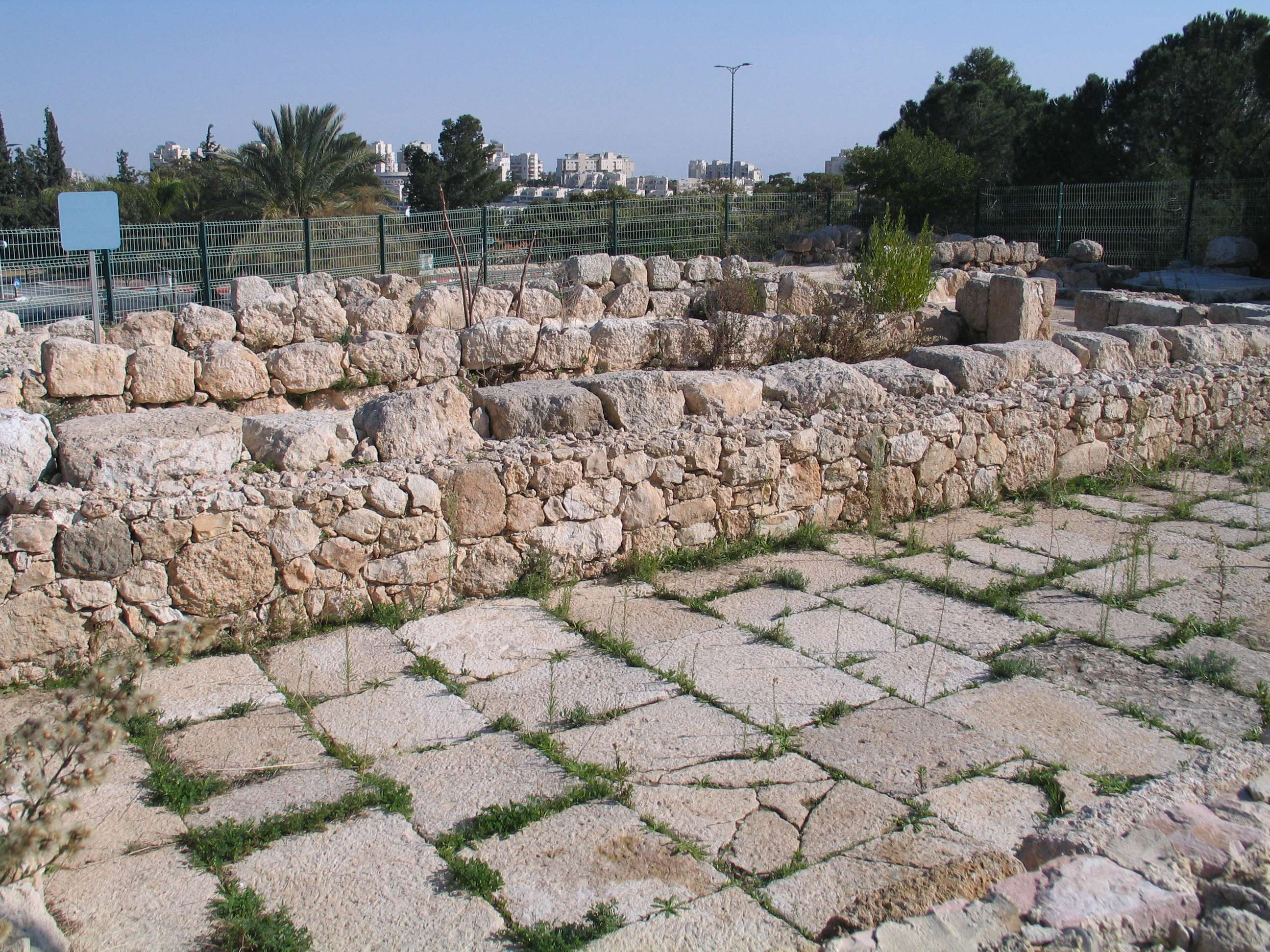
Monastery of Martyrius, Ma'ale Adumim

Monastery of Martyrius, whose ruins, known as Khirbet el-Murassas in Arabic, have been excavated in the centre of the West Bank settlement and city of Ma'ale Adumim, was one of the most important centres of monastic life in the Judean Desert during the Byzantine period. It was active between the second half of the 5th and the mid-7th century.

== History ==
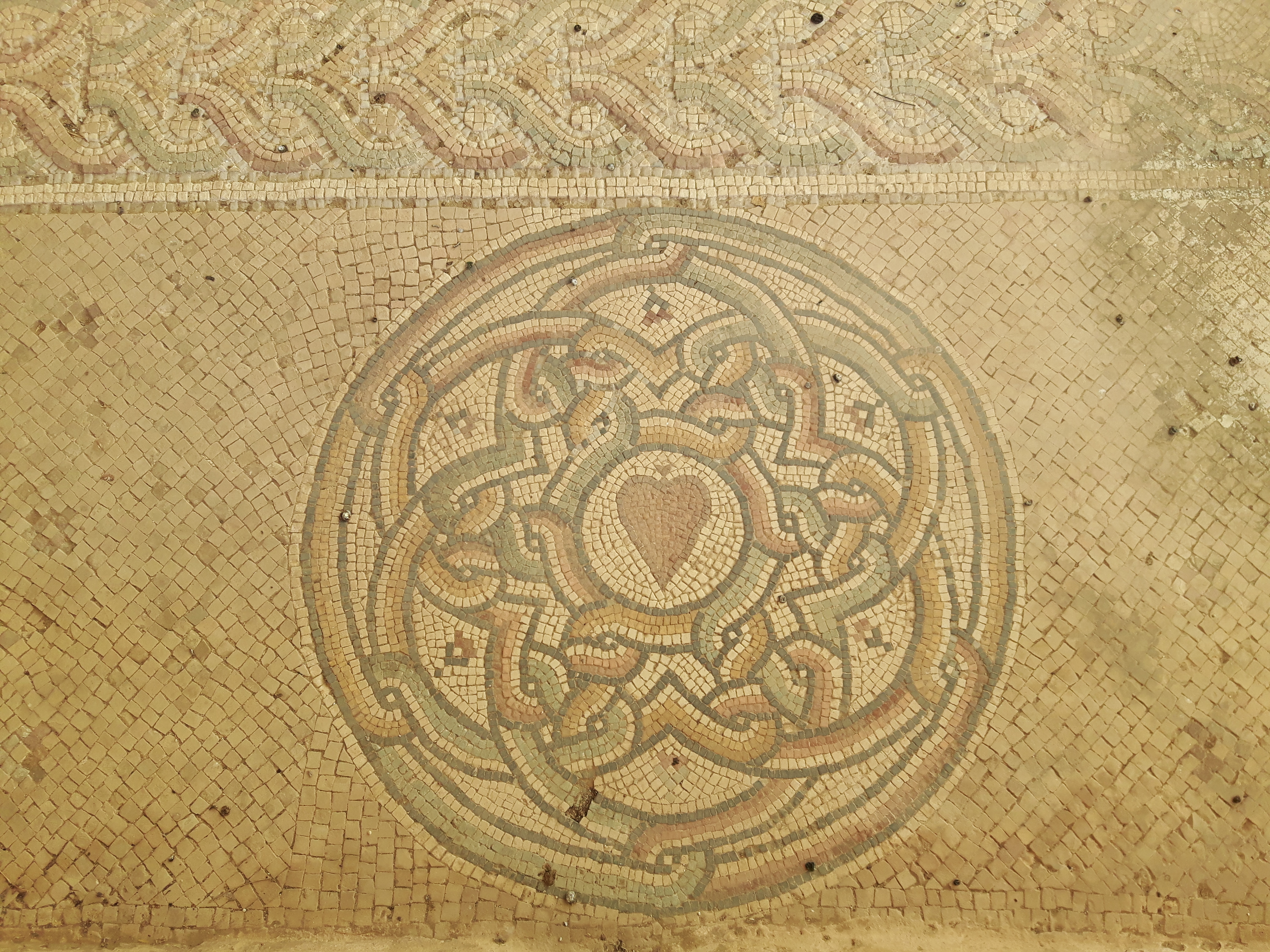
Part of the mosaic at the Monastery of Martyrius

Martyrius was born in Cappadocia (present-day Turkey) during the first half of the fifth century. After spending some time at the Laura of Euthymius in 457 CE, he lived as a hermit in a nearby cave. Later, After entering the Holy Orders, Martyrius served as a priest of the Church of the Holy Sepulcher in Jerusalem. He succeeded Anastasius of Jerusalem as Patriarch of Jerusalem in 478 and served until 486. It is believed that he built the monastery along the road from Jericho to Jerusalem bearing his name at this time.

Martyrius of Jerusalem was the Patriarch of Jerusalem from 478 to 486. He was succeeded by Sallustius of Jerusalem.

It was probably during his term as patriarch that Martyrius built the Monastery of Martyrius in the Judean hills east of Jerusalem. Martyrius died on April 13, 486.

The xenodocheion (pilgrim hostelry) was a source of considerable income to the Sabaite monks of the coenobium.

The monastery was damaged during the Persian invasion in 614 CE and was abandoned after the Arab conquest in the mid-7th century.

== 19th-century description ==
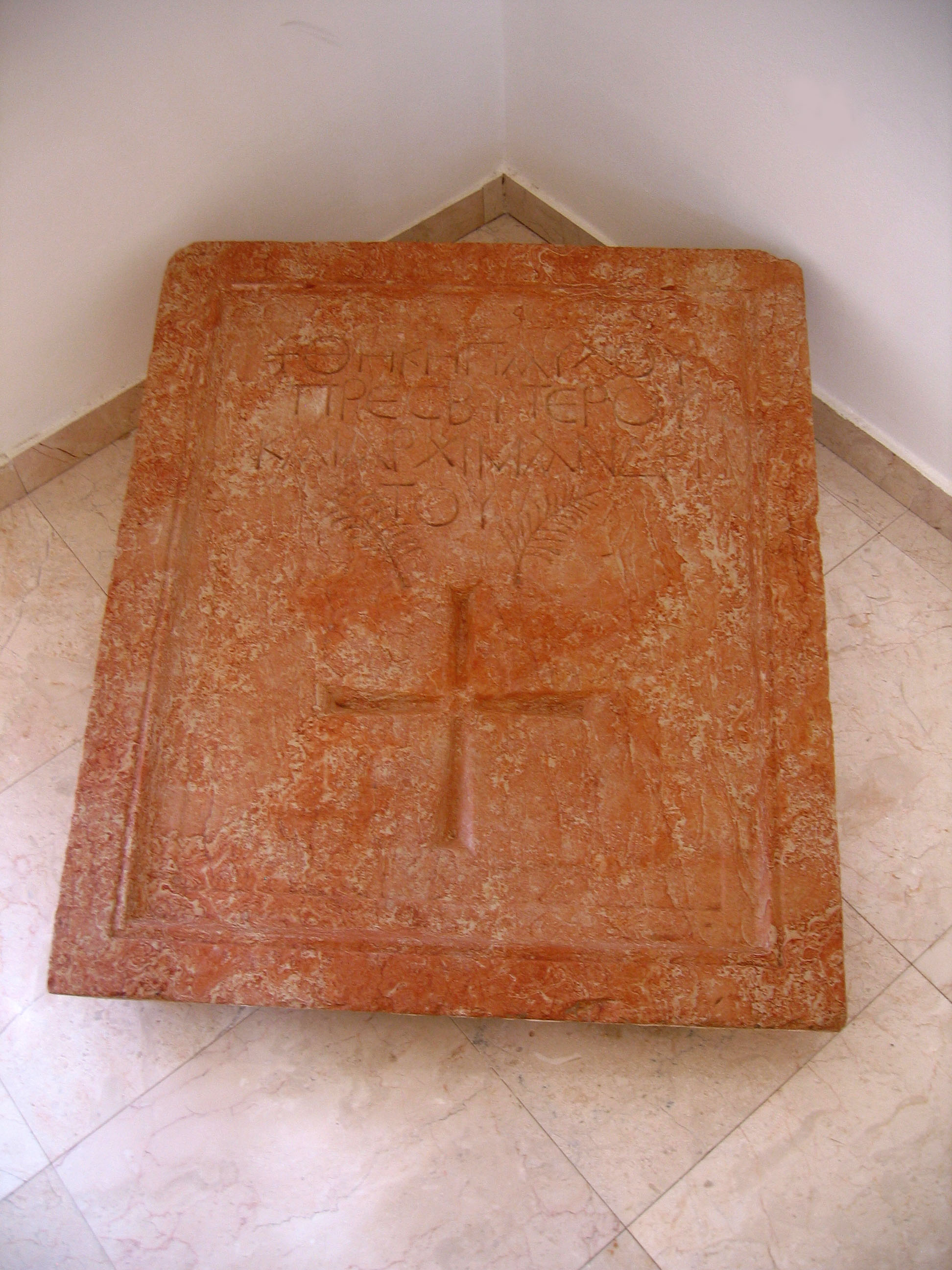
Gravestone of Paulos, presbyter and archimandrite of the monastery during Martyrius' time as Patriarch of Jerusalem (478-486), on display at the Museum of the Good Samaritan

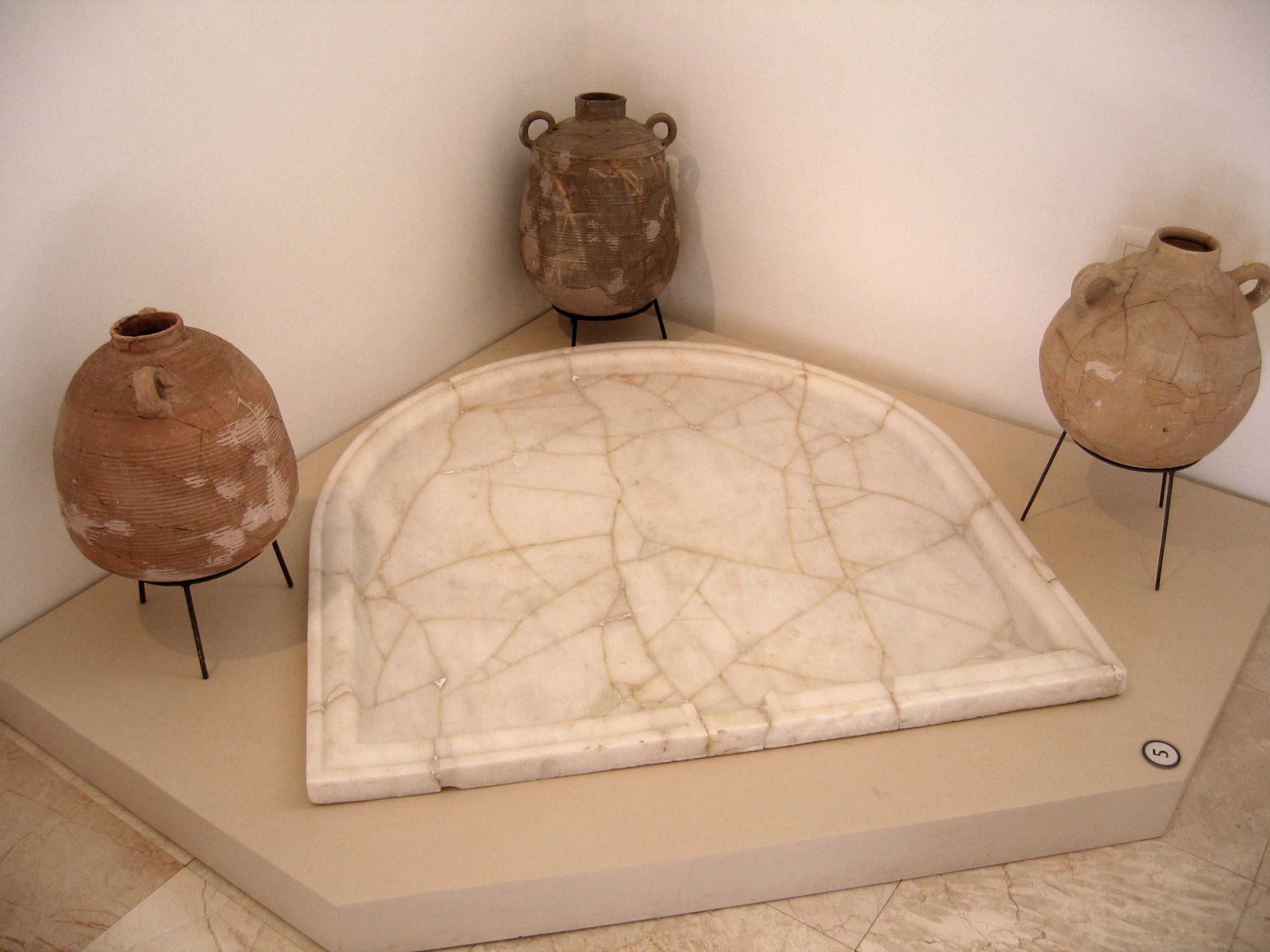
Marble table from the monastery, on display at the Museum of the Good Samaritan

The Palestine Exploration Fund's Survey of Western Palestine visited and measured up Khurbet el Murussus in 1874. They described it as:

A ruined monastery with a chapel, the foundations only remaining. The building has a total measure of 270 feet east and west on a line 86° west. The width north and south is about 90 feet. The chapel to the east has three apses. The nave 18 feet 3 inches diameter, the aisles 15 feet 6 inches. The length inside from the back of the apse is 64 feet. The northern aisle is almost entirely destroyed. Remains of tesselated pavement occur on the floor of the southern aisle. The chapel has an atrium on the west and narrow cloisters on the north and south. In the latter is a well. A tower of later date (Shunet Murussus) has been built in the south-west corner of the building, and to the south of this are remains of the cobble-pavement (whence the place is named), in a courtyard the eastern wall of which is visible. The tesselated pavement of the chapel has a simple pattern, red, white, blue and black. West of the building there is a cistern mouth with an octagonal cover, 6 feet 4 inches diameter, or 2 feet side. The Maltese cross is cut on each side of this octagon. The cover may perhaps have been originally a font removed from its proper place. The cistern beneath is of considerable extent, and has to the north another entrance, with steps leading down. A water-channel runs some 10 yards south-west to a small reservoir, about 10 feet square, which was fed from the larger cistern. One of the stones in the building was measured and found to be 3 feet 1 inch long, 1 foot 5 inches high, 2 feet 2 inches thick. The stones in the tower are older material used up; one had a cross, in a lozenge and square, cut on it. The ruin stands on a hill 500 feet above the valleys, and there are traces of a considerable site and other cisterns of good size. Between the ruin and Khurbet ed Dikki there is a rude erection which looks almost like a dolmen. Two slabs rest on others, and below there is a small semicircular platform of unhewn stones, and lower down a small natural cave."

== Recent excavation ==
In 1982–1985, the remains of the Monastery of Martyrius (Khirbet Murassas) were uncovered on a hill overlooking the road from Jericho to Jerusalem. The site was excavated by Yitzhak Magen of the Israel Antiquities Authority.

== Archaeological findings ==
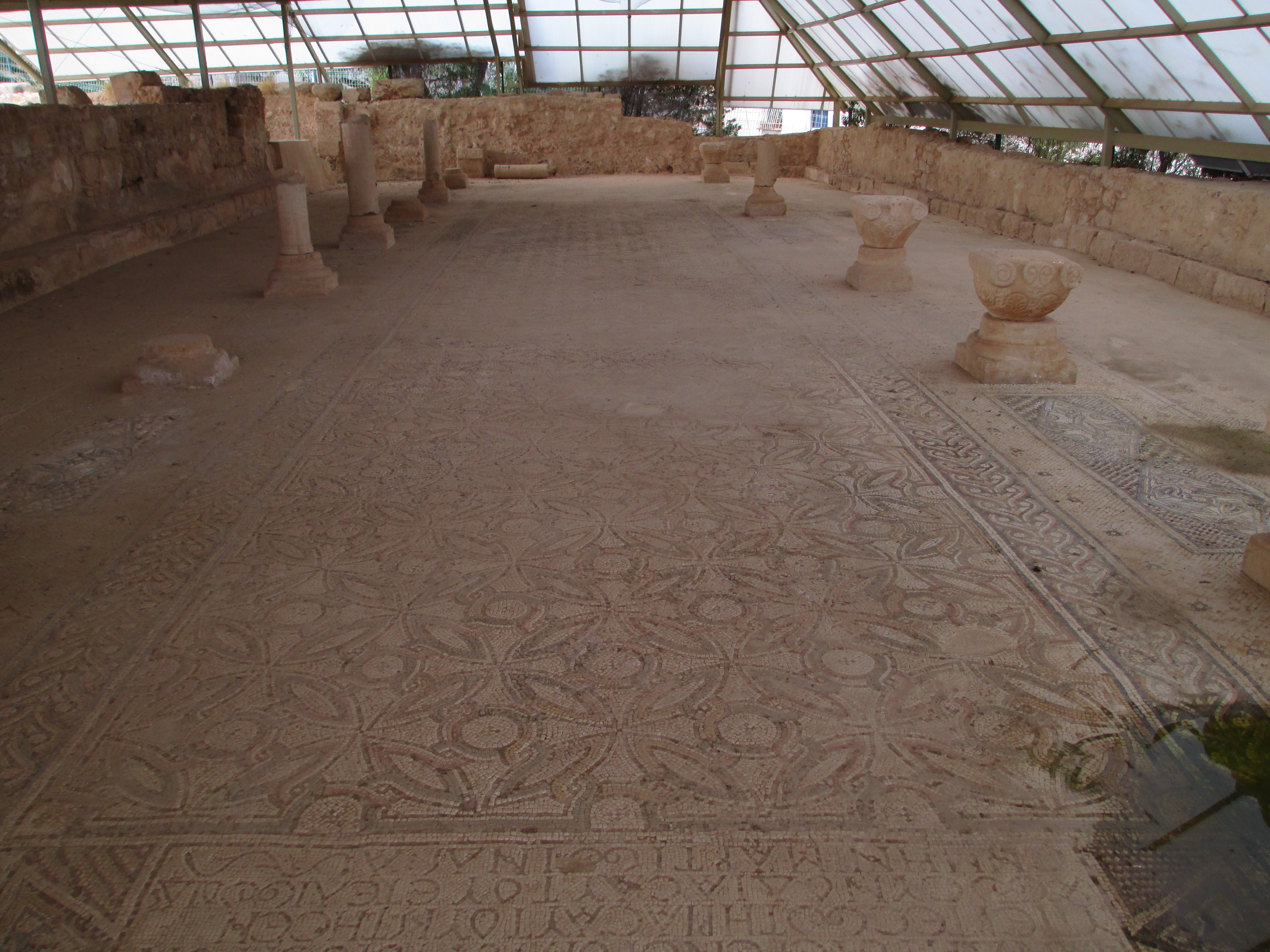
Mosaic floor, Monastery of Martyrius

=== Walls and gate ===
The square-shaped compound of the monastery covers an area of 2.5 acres (10,000 m^{2}). It is surrounded by walls preserved to a height of two meters. The gate was located in the eastern wall. A round rolling-stone, 2.5 meters in diameter, was found inside the gate, probably for additional protection.

=== Layout ===
The monastery was built around a large courtyard and included a church, several chapels, a refectory, a kitchen, a storeroom, a bathhouse, residential quarters and an animal pen. Outside the wall was a pilgrims hostel.

=== Main church ===
The main church was paved with colorful mosaics in geometric patterns interspersed with pictures of animals. A Greek inscription mentions the abbots Genesius and Iohannes.

=== Burial cave ===
On the northern side of the complex is a cave in which several skeletons were found. A Greek inscription cites the names of three priests buried there. It is believed this is the cave where Martyrius lived before joining the church hierarchy in Jerusalem.

=== Refectory and kitchen ===
The refectory is surrounded by stone benches and divided by two rows of columns which supported a second story. The floor, discovered intact, is covered with mosaics in geometrical designs. The kitchen was also paved with mosaics and contained marble tables. Hundreds of ceramic vessels, cooking pots and wine cups were found there.

=== Pilgrims hostel ===
The hostel provided guests with a chapel, sleeping quarters and a stable.

=== Water supply ===
Numerous rock-cut cisterns were found, as were canals for collecting and channelling rainwater into the cisterns.A massive, two-aisled vaulted cistern was found, hewn from rocks. The cistern could hold 20,000-30,000 m3 of water which may have been used to irrigate vegetable gardens and fruit plantations. When one cistern was filled, the overflow was conveyed to another.

== See also ==
- Adummim, biblical place-name connected to the ascent of Adummim, leading up from Jericho towards Jerusalem
- Archaeology of Palestine
- Horvat Berachot
- Khirbet Beit Sila

== Bibliography ==
- Conder, C.R.; Kitchener, H.H. (1883). The Survey of Western Palestine: Memoirs of the Topography, Orography, Hydrography, and Archaeology. Vol. 3. London: Committee of the Palestine Exploration Fund.
- Palmer, E.H. (1881). The Survey of Western Palestine: Arabic and English Name Lists Collected During the Survey by Lieutenants Conder and Kitchener, R. E. Transliterated and Explained by E.H. Palmer. Committee of the Palestine Exploration Fund.

== External sources ==
- Survey of Western Palestine, Map 17: IAA, Wikimedia commons
- Map showing location of monastery in Ma'ale Adumim (Hebrew) http://www.jr.co.il/ma/monast.htm
- BibleWalks.com article with pictures and plans
