= Beitunia =

Beitunia بيتونيا
- Municipality type B

Arabic transcription(s)
  - Arabic: بيتونيا
  - Latin: Beituniya (official); Beatonia (unofficial)
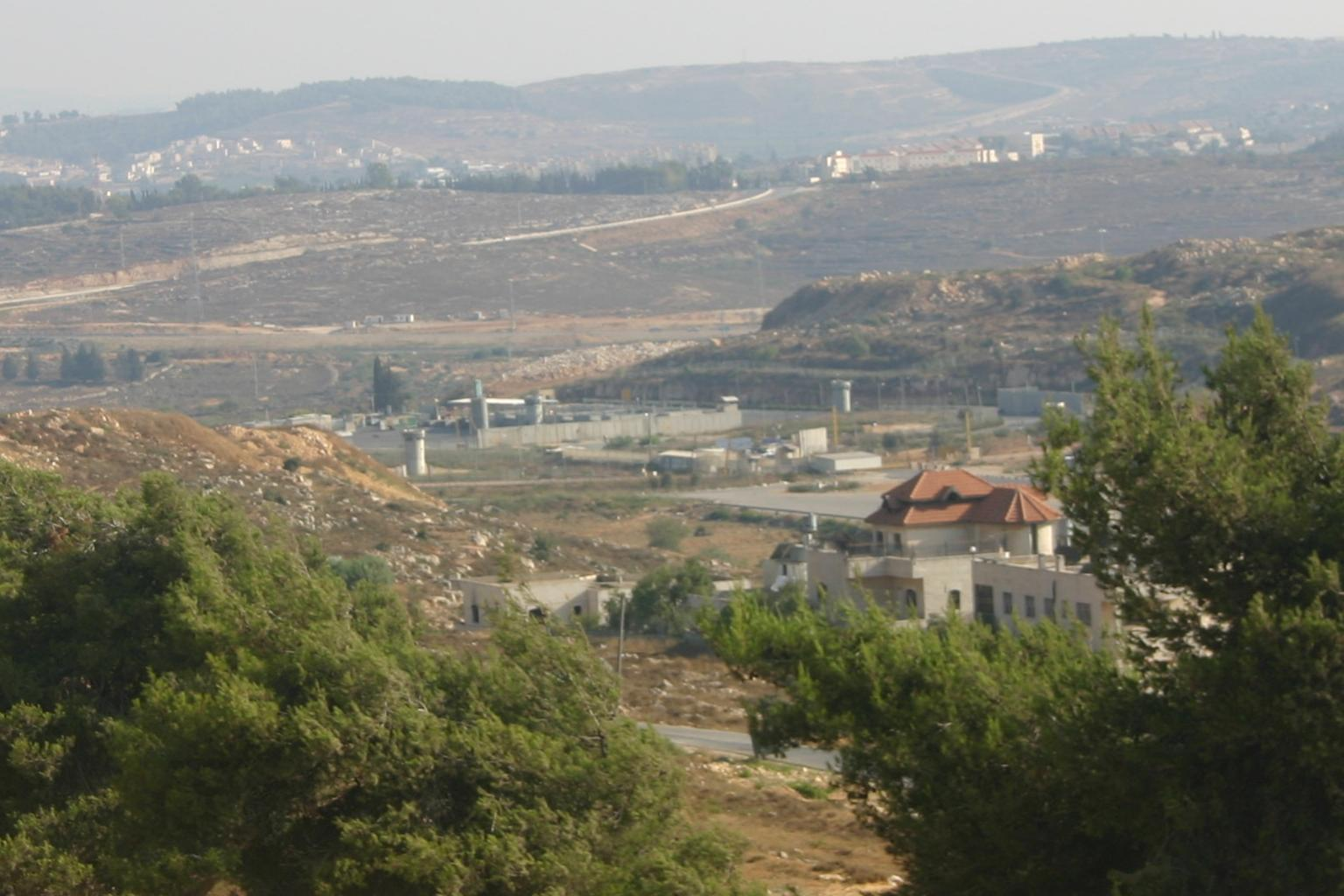
- View of the city from the west

- Municipal Seal of Beitunia

- Location of Beitunia within Palestine
- Coordinates: 31°53′20″N 35°10′03″E
- Palestine grid: 166/143
- State: State of Palestine
- Governorate: Ramallah and al-Bireh

Government
  - Type: Municipality
  - Head of Municipality: Ribhi Dola

Area
  - Municipality type B: 26.2 km^{2} (10.1 sq mi)

Population (2017)
  - Municipality type B: 26,604
  - Density: 1,020/km^{2} (2,630/sq mi)
  - Metro: 153,237
- Name meaning: Beitunia, personal name
- Website: www.beitunia.ps

Beitunia (Arabic: بيتونيا), also Bitunya, is a Palestinian city located 3 kilometers (1.9 mi) west of Ramallah and 14 kilometers (8.7 mi) north of Jerusalem, in the Ramallah and al-Bireh Governorate of Palestine, in the central West Bank. According to the Palestinian Central Bureau of Statistics, the city had a population of 26,604 in 2017, making it the third largest locality in its governorate after al-Bireh and Ramallah.

== History ==
Potsherds from the Byzantine, Mamluk and early Ottoman period have been found. A 1982 survey found two pillars and remnants of an olive press, along with another pillar located in one of the courtyards. The Mandatory DOA documented a medieval structure in ruins, characterized by vaults, alongside a white mosaic floor, a damaged pillar, a winepress, a rock-cut reservoir, and burial caves. (In 1883, the PEF's Survey of Western Palestine mentioned that "[t]o the east are cisterns, wine-preses, and a pond (el-Balûā), which contains water in winter. On the north and east are rock-cut tombs with well-cut entrances, but blocked up.").

To the east are cisterns, wine-presses, and a pond (el-Balûā), which contains water in winter. On the north and east are rock-cut tombs with well-cut entrances, but blocked up.

=== Crusader period ===
In 1883, the PEF's Survey of Western Palestine suggested that Beitunia was the Crusader village Uniet, which was one of 21 villages given by King Godfrey as a fief to the Church of the Holy Sepulchre. However, in 1887, Röhricht identified Beitunia with Beitiumen, another fief given by the King to the Holy Sepulchre. Conder found this to be "evidently correct" and hence "very doubtful" that Beitunia was Uniet. Abel, writing in 1931, suggested that Beitunia was Beit Uniet, mentioned in an early 12th-century text.

A large vaulted building in the town, named Badd al-Balad ("oil press of the village"), later part of several modern houses, has been dated to the Crusader period.

=== Mamluk period ===
Beitunia is the most frequently referenced village in a corpus of waqf (religious endowment)-related documents found in Jerusalem dated to 1306–1308, during Mamluk rule in Palestine (1260–1516). The documents largely concerned the grain and olive revenues of Beitunia, called 'Bayt Uniya', earmarked for the Haram al-Sharif (Temple Mount) in Jerusalem, but also provide other information about the villagers. The documents mention headmen from the village, all belonging to the clan of al-Subahiyyun (sing. Subah): Sulayman ibn Yusuf ibn Ghazwan, Ali ibn Hamad ibn Hammad, Musa ibn Muhammad ibn Hamdan and Ali ibn Manna' ibn Sultan. The headmen guaranteed each other's obligations to pay the waqf from Beitunia's olive and grain harvests in 1306, 1307 and 1308. These and a third document also obligated the headmen to cultivate Beitunia's lands and not to leave them fallow and to ensure a fourth villager, Kamil ibn Hamad ibn Musa, tended to his lands and vineyards and sowed summer and winter crops. Also in this corpus were orders to Beitunia's residents not to travel to the village of Yalo, presumably in support of its inhabitants with whom they were allied, and regarding the leasing of a shop to a Christian dyer, Abu al-Wahsh ibn Yuhanna, from nearby Beit Rima.

=== Ottoman period ===
Beitunia, like the rest of Palestine, was incorporated into the Ottoman Empire in 1517, and in the census of 1596, the village was located in the Nahiya of Quds of the Liwa of Quds. The population was 75 households and 5 bachelors, all Muslim. They paid a fixed tax rated of 33,3% on wheat, barley, olives, vineyards, fruit trees, goats and/or beehives, in addition to occasional revenues; a total of 23,000 akçe.

In 1738 Richard Pococke called it "a place called Bethany to the north." The American scholar Edward Robinson noted it in 1838, as a Muslim village, part of the El-Kuds district.

In 1870 the French explorer Victor Guérin found that Beitunia contained six hundred inhabitants. Socin found from an official Ottoman village list from about the same year (1870) that Beitunia had a total of 147 houses and a population of 481, though the population count included men, only. Several inscriptions, dating to 1873-74 and forwards, have been described from the house of the village Mukhtar. In 1883, the PEF's Survey of Western Palestine described Beitunia as "A good-sized village of stone, surrounded by olives, standing high on a flat rocky ridge, with a plain to the east. To the east are cisterns, wine-presses, and a pond (el-Balûā), which contains water in winter. On the north and east are rock-cut tombs with well-cut entrances, but blocked up." In 1896 the population of Betunja was estimated to be about 1,056 persons.

=== British Mandate ===
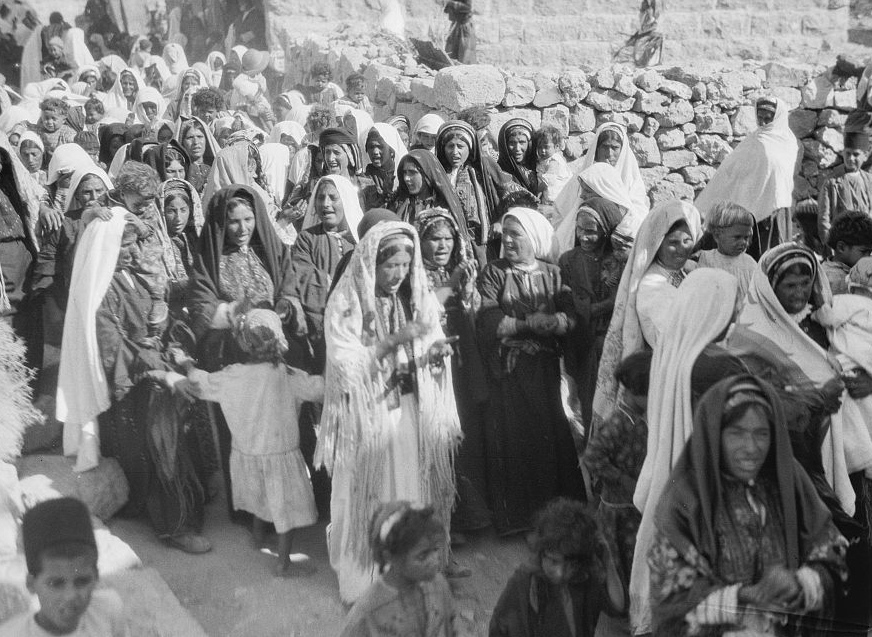
Wedding procession, between 1934 and 1939

In the 1922 census of Palestine conducted by the British Mandate authorities, Beitunia had a population of 948 Muslim, increasing in the 1931 census to 1,213, still all Muslim, in 277 houses.

Due to a lack of economic opportunities in the early 20th century, many people emigrated. Some went to the Chicago area, and were involved in the startup of the Bridgeview Mosque.

In the 1945 statistics the population was 1,490, all Muslims, while the total land area was 23,366 dunams, according to an official land and population survey. Of this, 7,854 were allocated for plantations and irrigable land, 8,381 for cereals, while 77 dunams were classified as built-up areas.

=== Jordanian period ===
In the wake of the 1948 Arab–Israeli War, and after the 1949 Armistice Agreements, Beitunia came under Jordanian rule.

In 1961, the population of Beituniya was 2,216.

=== Post-1967 ===
Since the Six-Day War in 1967, Beitunia has been under Israeli occupation. After 1995, under the Oslo Accords, 3,759 dunums (17.8%) of the town's lands were classified as Area A, 472 dunums (2.2%) were classified as Area B, while the remaining 16,896 dunums (80%) were classified as Area C. Israel has confiscated land from Beitunia in order to construct two Israeli settlements: Beit Horon and Giv'at Ze'ev.

==== Second Intifada: Israeli West Bank barrier, killings ====
The Second Intifada took place between September 2000 and February 2005. In June 2002, Israel began building the West Bank barrier.

Beitunia's land area consists of 2, 617.4 hectares (26,174 dunams) of which 336.2 hectares is built-up area. The Israeli West Bank barrier separates the urban area from 66% of the town's lands, however, most of the cut-off territory (Seam Zone) is made-up of forest and open spaces making it prime agricultural and grazing land.

According to the Oslo Accords, the IDF is prevented from entering areas A (an area under full Palestinian Authority control), but Operation Defensive Shield in March to May 2002 abolished this distinction when the IDF searched that year in Beitunia for a suspect who wanted to make himself a "martyr." The IDF-search extended to Qalandiya, Bayt Surik, Bayt Deko, al-Judeirah, and Hizma. Fadel Abu Zahira (9 years old) was shot and killed on 18 April 2002 in his own home in Beitunia. The bullet came from an armored vehicle and went through the window.

Hussein Mahmoud 'Awad 'Alian (17 years old) was killed by Israeli gunfire on 16 April 2004 during demonstrations against the barrier.

==== Killings after the Second Intifada ====
Two boys, Nadim Nawarah and Mohammad Odeh, were shot and killed in the Beitunia killings on 15 May 2014. One Israeli policeman was arrested for Nawarah's death, and was later under a plea deal sentenced to 9 months in jail.

==== Salah ad-Din Mosque ====
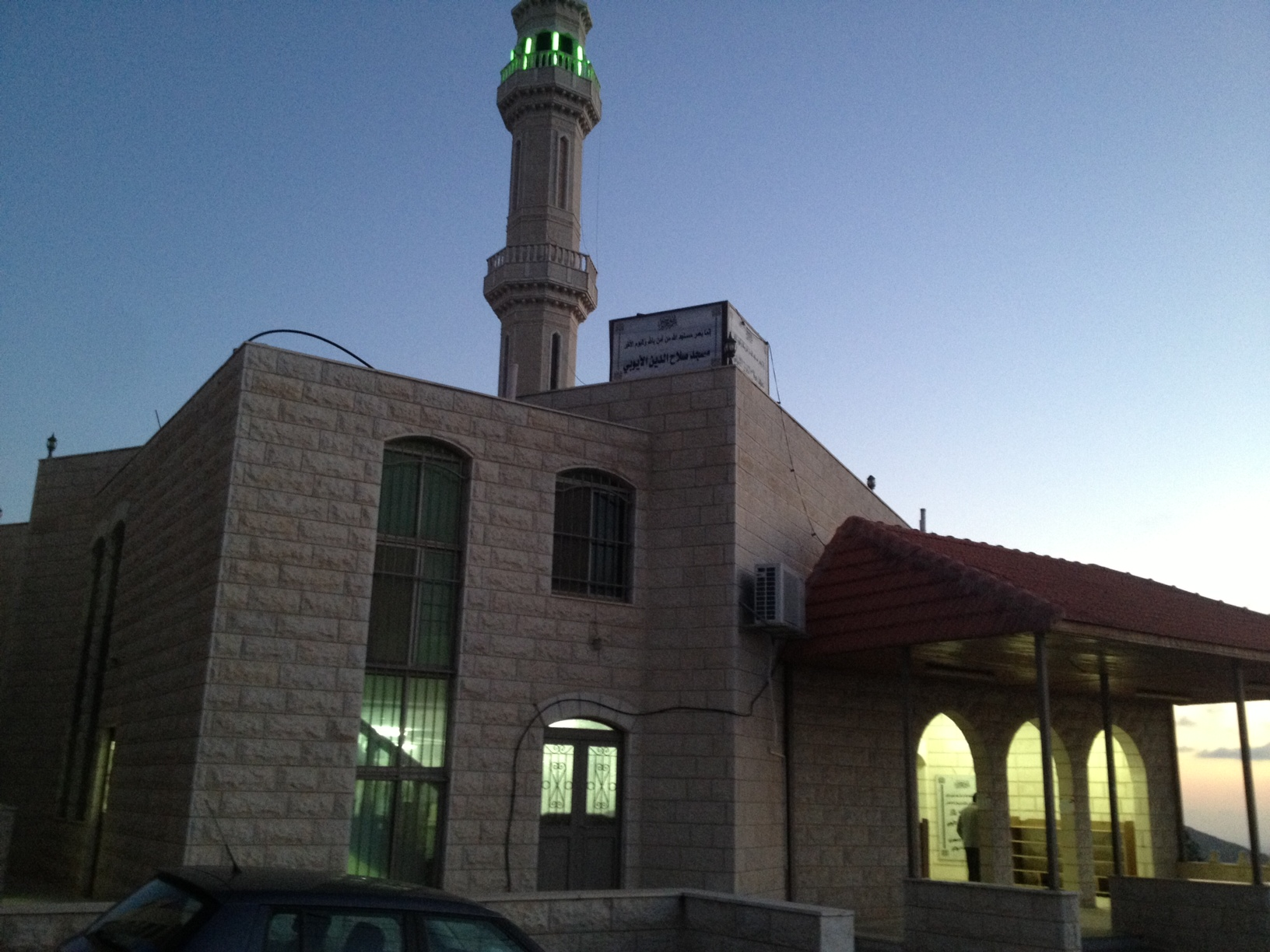
Salah ad-Din Mosque

Salah ad-Din Mosque is located to the west of the city and was established in 2002. It is named related to the old Muslim leader Salah ad-Din al-Ayubi. It is considered one of the main mosques in the area. It consists of 3 floors and has a capacity for approximately 500 persons.

== See also ==
- Bir ed-Duwali – adjacent archaeological site
- Khirbet Beit Sila – adjacent archaeological site

== Bibliography ==
- Barron, J.B., ed. (1923). Palestine: Report and General Abstracts of the Census of 1922. Government of Palestine.
- Conder, C.R.; Kitchener, H.H. (1883). The Survey of Western Palestine: Memoirs of the Topography, Orography, Hydrography, and Archaeology. Vol. 3. London: Committee of the Palestine Exploration Fund.
- Conder, C.R. (1890). "Norman Palestine". Quarterly Statement - Palestine Exploration Fund. 22: 29–37.
- Ellenblum, R. (2003). Frankish Rural Settlement in the Latin Kingdom of Jerusalem. Cambridge University Press. ISBN 9780521521871. (pp. 73, 185)
- Finkelstein, I.; Lederman, Zvi, eds. (1997). Highlands of many cultures. Tel Aviv: Institute of Archaeology of Tel Aviv University Publications Section. ISBN 965-440-007-3.
- Government of Jordan, Department of Statistics (1964). First Census of Population and Housing. Volume I: Final Tables; General Characteristics of the Population (PDF).
- Government of Palestine, Department of Statistics (1945). Village Statistics, April, 1945.
- Guérin, V. (1875). Description Géographique Historique et Archéologique de la Palestine (in French). Vol. 2: Samarie, pt. 2. Paris: L'Imprimerie Nationale.
- Hadawi, S. (1970). Village Statistics of 1945: A Classification of Land and Area ownership in Palestine. Palestine Liberation Organization Research Centre.
- Hartmann, M. (1883). "Die Ortschaftenliste des Liwa Jerusalem in dem türkischen Staatskalender für Syrien auf das Jahr 1288 der Flucht (1871)". Zeitschrift des Deutschen Palästina-Vereins. 6: 102–149.
- Hütteroth, W.-D.; Abdulfattah, K. (1977). Historical Geography of Palestine, Transjordan and Southern Syria in the Late 16th Century. Erlanger Geographische Arbeiten, Sonderband 5. Erlangen, Germany: Vorstand der Fränkischen Geographischen Gesellschaft. ISBN 3-920405-41-2.
- Mills, E., ed. (1932). Census of Palestine 1931. Population of Villages, Towns and Administrative Areas. Jerusalem: Government of Palestine.
- Palmer, E.H. (1881). The Survey of Western Palestine: Arabic and English Name Lists Collected During the Survey by Lieutenants Conder and Kitchener, R. E. Transliterated and Explained by E.H. Palmer. Committee of the Palestine Exploration Fund.
- Pococke, R. (1745). A description of the East, and some other countries. Vol. 2. London: Printed for the author, by W. Bowyer.
- Pringle, D. (1997). Secular buildings in the Crusader Kingdom of Jerusalem: an archaeological Gazetter. Cambridge University Press. ISBN 0521-46010-7.
- Pringle, D. (2009). The Churches of the Crusader Kingdom of Jerusalem: Volume IV The cities of Acre and Tyre with Addenda and Corrigenda to Volumes I-III. Cambridge University Press. ISBN 978-0-521-85148-0.
- Rapoport, Yossef (2025). Becoming Arab: The Formation of Arab Identity in the Medieval Middle East. Princeton: Princeton University Press. ISBN 9780691210636.
- Robinson, E.; Smith, E. (1841). Biblical Researches in Palestine, Mount Sinai and Arabia Petraea: A Journal of Travels in the year 1838. Vol. 2. Boston: Crocker & Brewster.
- Robinson, E.; Smith, E. (1841). Biblical Researches in Palestine, Mount Sinai and Arabia Petraea: A Journal of Travels in the year 1838. Vol. 3. Boston: Crocker & Brewster.
- Röhricht, R. (1887). "Studien zur mittelalterlichen Geographie und Topographie Syriens". Zeitschrift des Deutschen Palästina-Vereins. 10: 195–344.
- Röhricht, R. (1893). (RRH) Regesta regni Hierosolymitani (MXCVII-MCCXCI) (in Latin). Berlin: Libraria Academica Wageriana.
- de Roziére, E., ed. (1849). Cartulaire de l'église du Saint Sépulchre de Jérusalem: publié d'après les manuscrits du Vatican (in Latin and French). Paris: Imprimerie nationale.
- Schick, C. (1896). "Zur Einwohnerzahl des Bezirks Jerusalem". Zeitschrift des Deutschen Palästina-Vereins. 19: 120–127.
- Sharon, M. (1999). Corpus Inscriptionum Arabicarum Palaestinae, B-C. Vol. II. BRILL. ISBN 9004110836.
- Socin, A. (1879). "Alphabetisches Verzeichniss von Ortschaften des Paschalik Jerusalem". Zeitschrift des Deutschen Palästina-Vereins. 2: 135–163.
