= Inn of the Good Samaritan =

Museum and historical inn in the West Bank, Palestine

Coordinates: 31°48′59″N 35°21′34″E

The Good Samaritan Museum
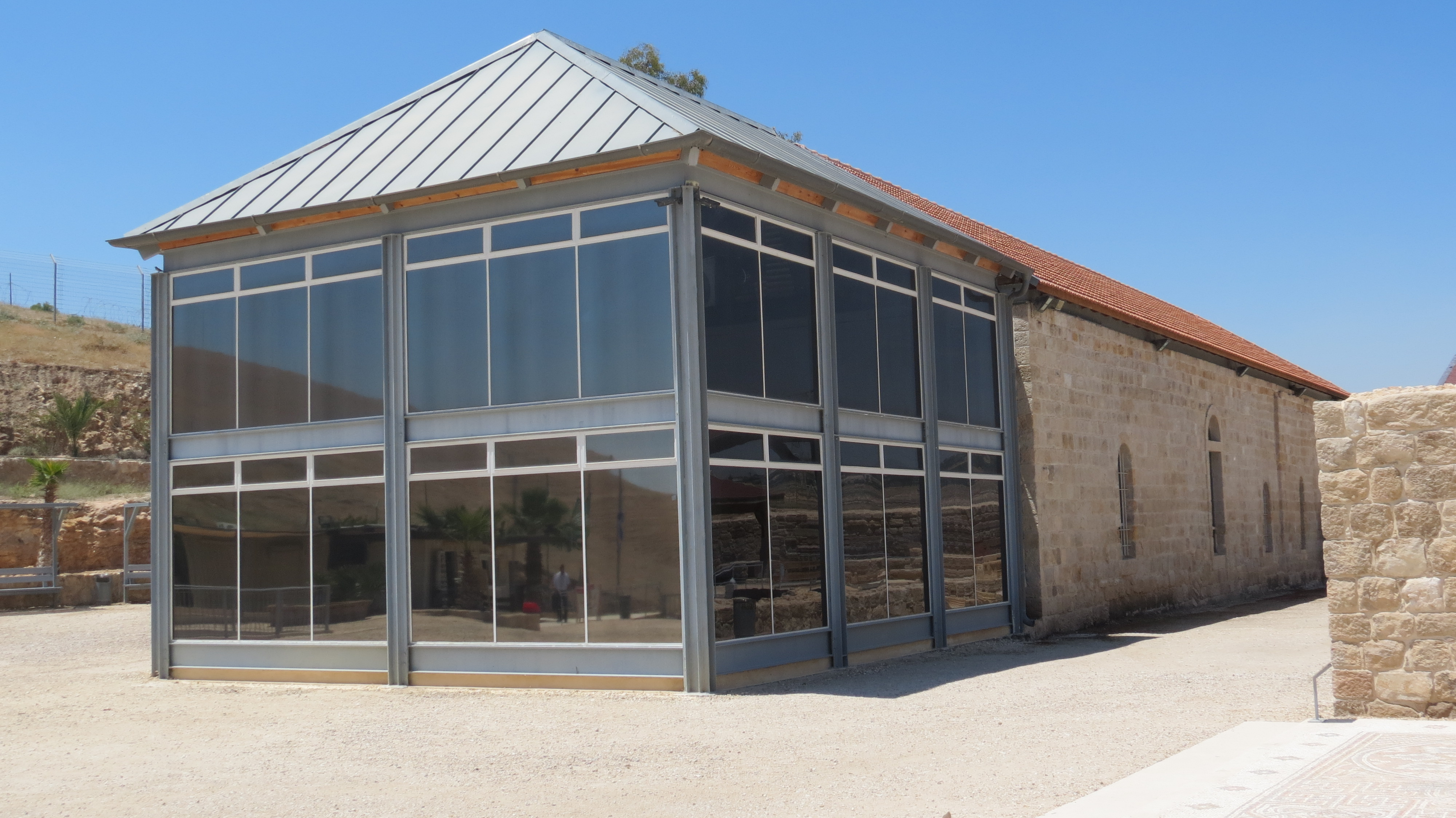
- The Good Samaritan Museum entrance
- Established: 4 June 2009 (opening date)
- Location: West Bank
- Type: Archaeology museum, biblical site
- Collection size: Mosaics from ancient churches and synagogues
- Curator: Yitzhak Magen
- Website: The Good Samaritan Museum

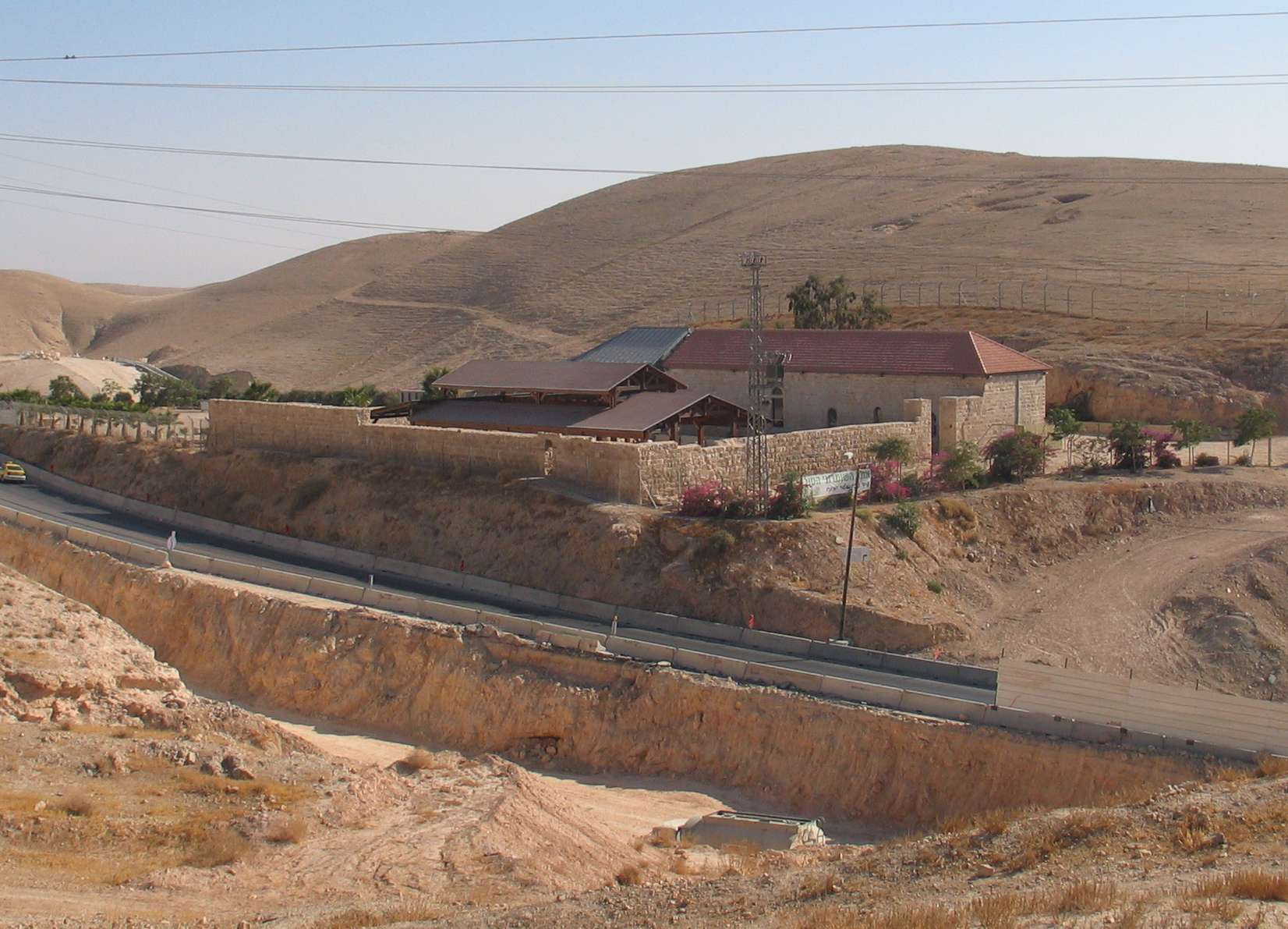
The "Inn of the Good Samaritan Museum" in 2010, during construction work to expand Highway 1 (Israel) to a dual carriageway, separating the inn from the Crusader castle ruins

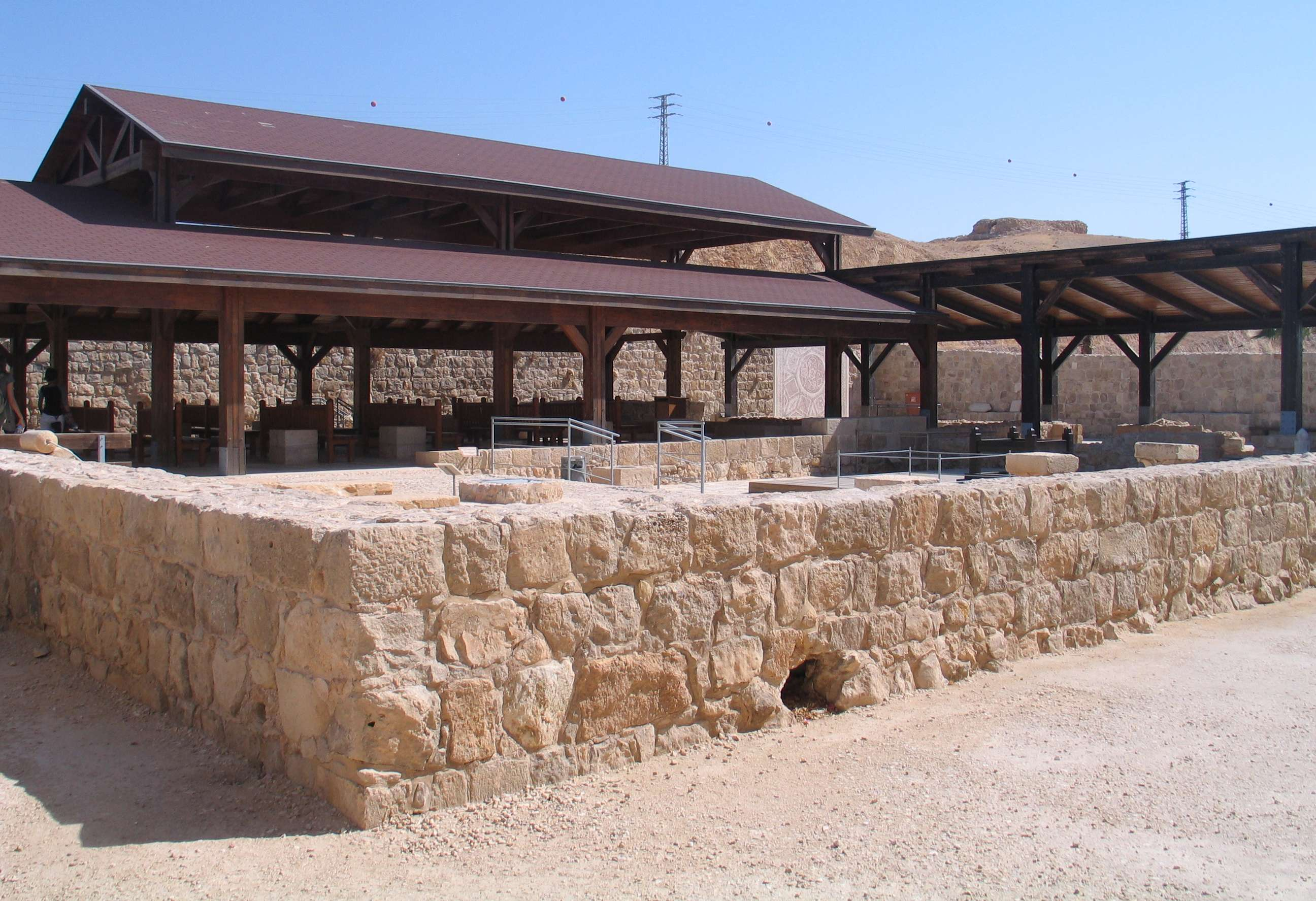
Roof over the restored mosaic floor of the Byzantine church. The structure can again be used for Christian worship.

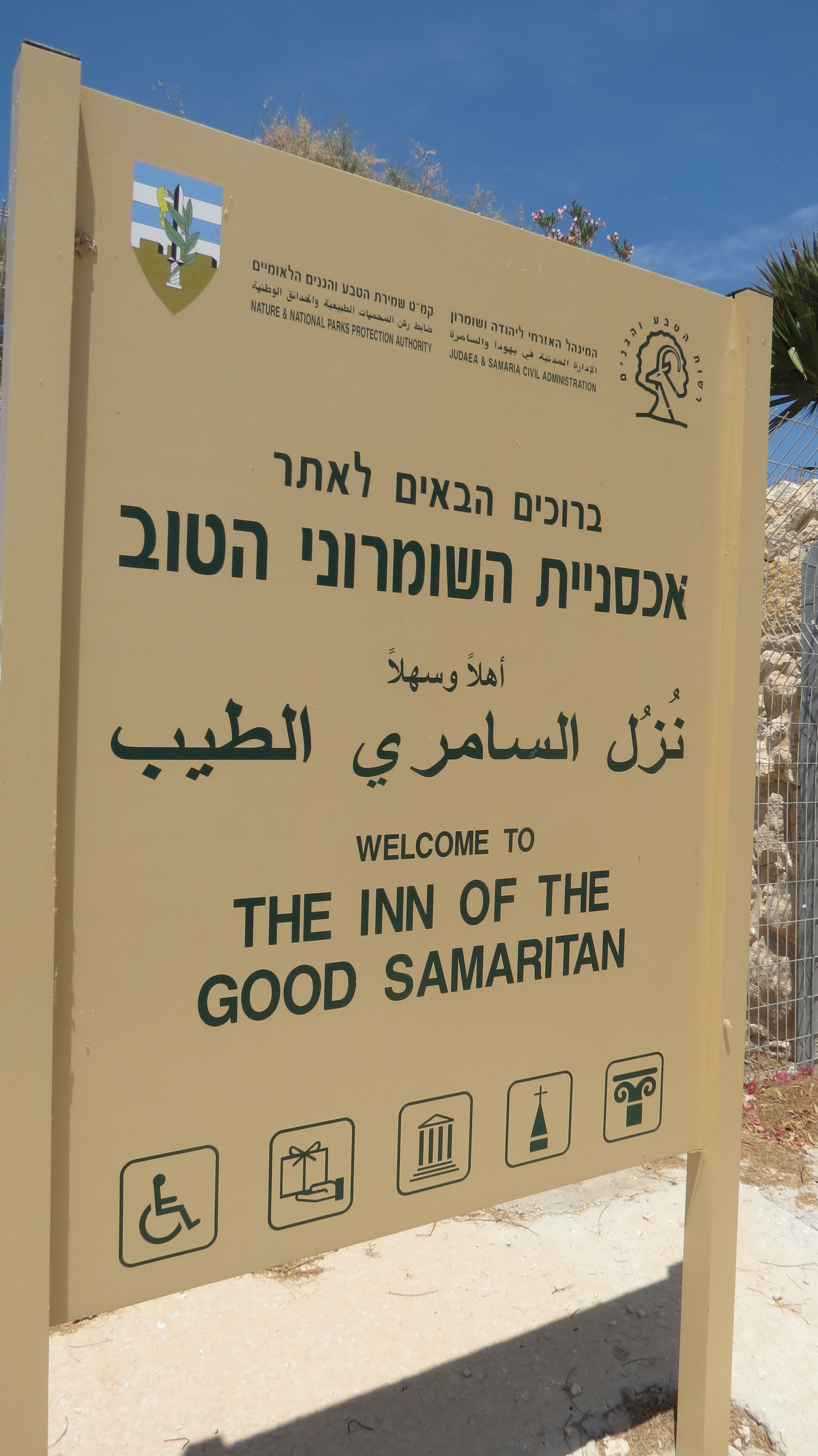
Welcome sign at the Good Samaritan Museum

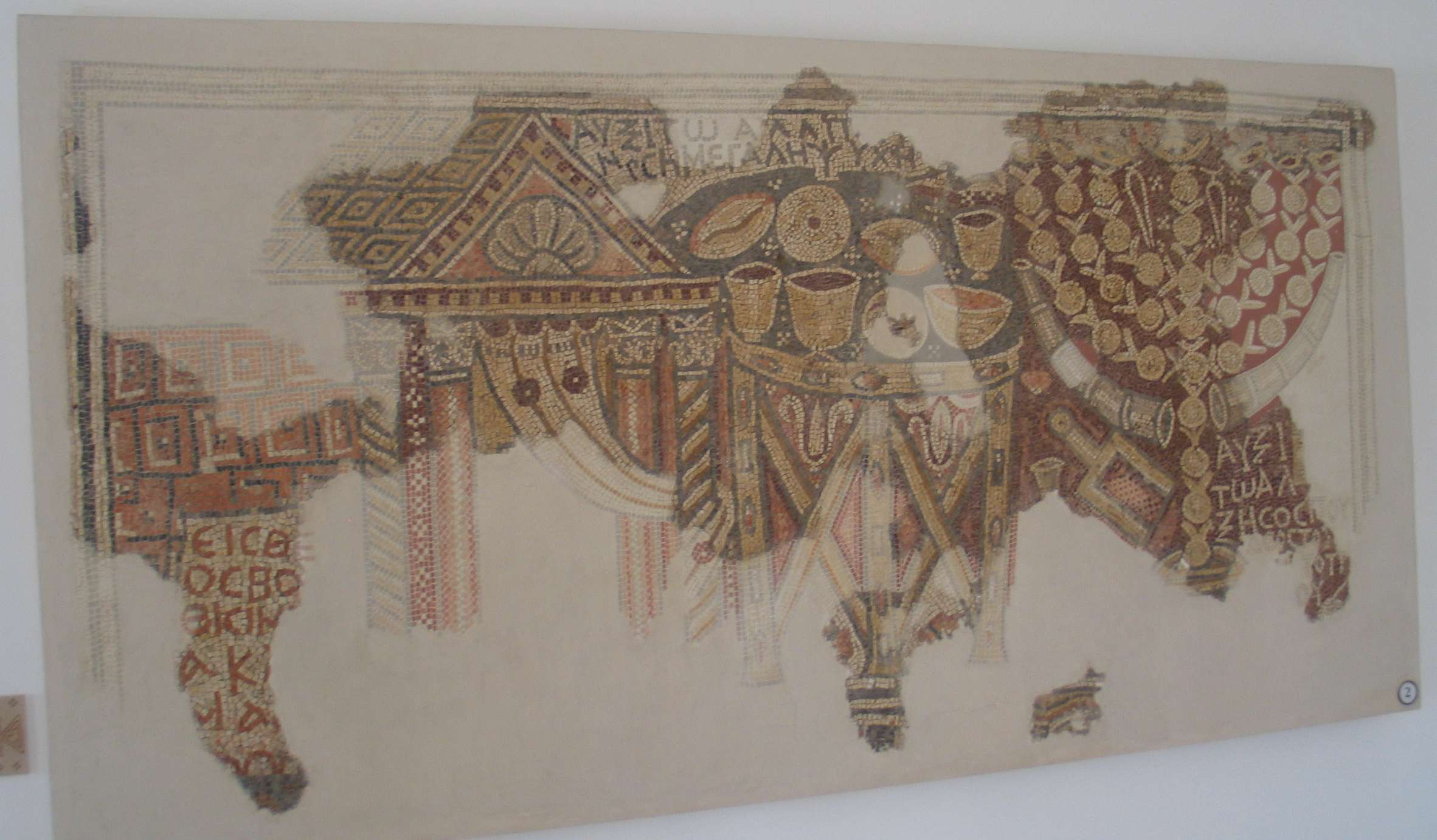
Mosaic floor from the Byzantine-era Samaritan synagogue at El-Khirbe

The Inn of the Good Samaritan (Hebrew: אכסניית השומרוני הטוב; Arabic: خان الحترورة) is a national park, museum, ancient archaeological site and former inn administered by the Israel Nature and Parks Authority located near Ma'ale Adumim, halfway between Jerusalem and Jericho, at an elevation of 298 metres above sea level.

The Inn is named after the New Testament's Parable of the Good Samaritan, and houses a museum of ancient mosaics and other archaeological findings mostly dating from the 4th-7th centuries that were collected from churches and Jewish and Samaritan synagogues from the West Bank and from the ancient Gaza synagogue.

Beginning in biblical times, Israelite and later Jewish pilgrims from Galilee took the Jericho–Jerusalem road passing by the site to worship at the Temple in Jerusalem. In later times, Christian pilgrims used the road to reach the baptismal site of Jesus on the Jordan River near Jericho (see Al-Maghtas and Qasr al-Yahud). The area of the Inn of the Good Samaritan was repeatedly fortified, and traveller inns were built a little below the hilltop. This is reflected in the presence of two distinct, if related, archaeological sites in close proximity to each other, the other site being the ruins of a Templar castle probably built on top of a Byzantine monastery, although today they are separated by the modern Jerusalem–Jericho highway.

Today, the Inn of the Good Samaritan is a mosaic museum, and serves as a tourist attraction visited especially by international tourists, particularly Christians. The museum features a guided audio tour, and is accessible to persons with disabilities.

== Christian tradition ==
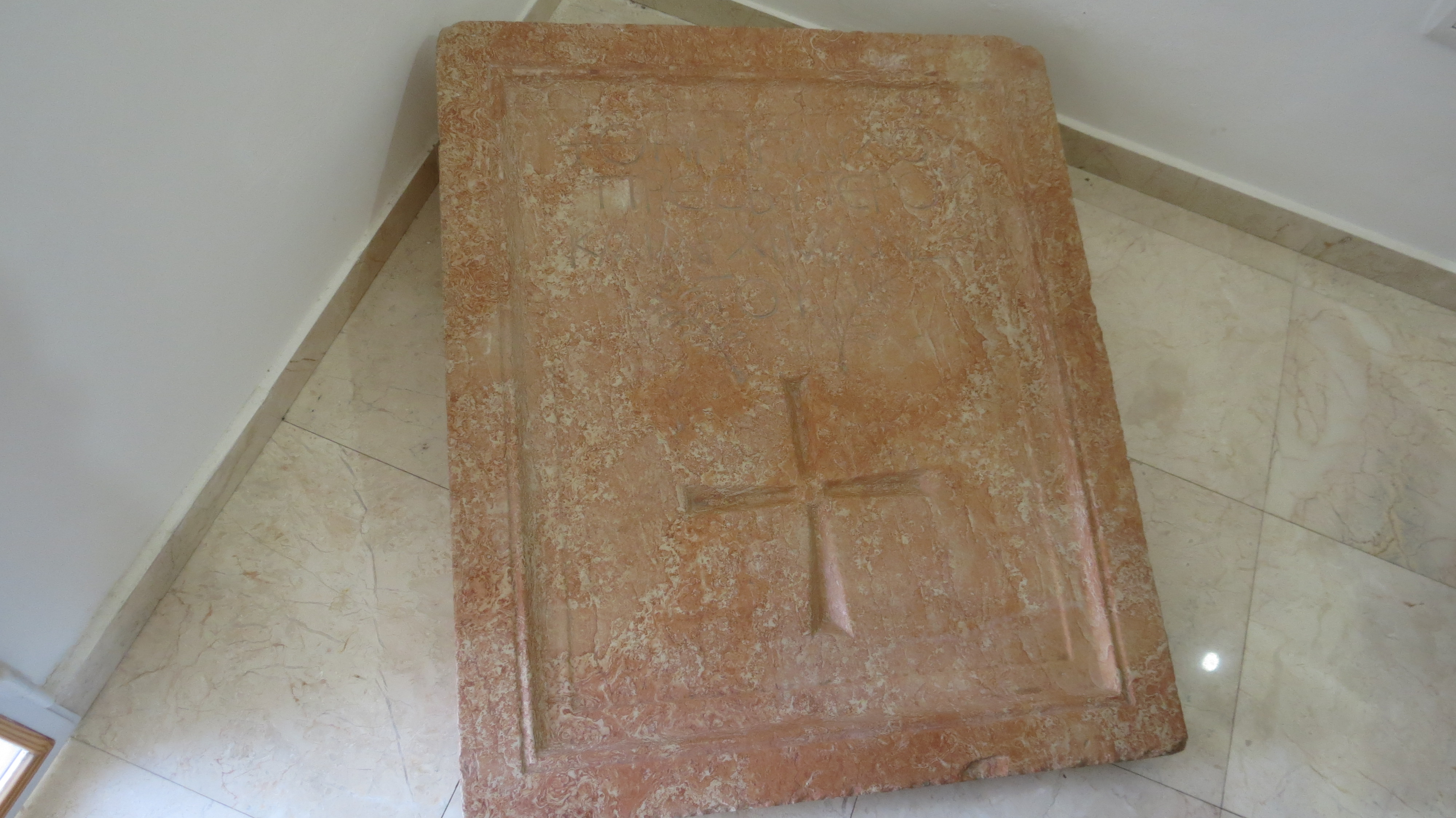
Tombstone of the head of the monastery of Martyrius, late 5th or early 6th century. Inscription in Greek: "This is the tomb of Paul, priest and archimandrite."

According to the Christian tradition, the site may have been the location of the event of the "Parable of the Good Samaritan" in the Gospel of Luke (Lk 10:25–37, specifically Lk 10:33). The association is made already by Jerome in 385 and continued through the centuries, the British Mandate authorities adopting the name Good Samaritan Inn for the site. There are few inns located between Jerusalem and Jericho, and The Inn of the Good Samaritan is a plausible fit for the location of the story. After 1967 Israel developed the ruins as a tourist site officially called the "Good Samaritan Inn". However, the identification as the "inn of the good Samaritan" is neither of Byzantine, nor of Crusader date, but of a later time, when pilgrims saw in the blood-coloured rocks rather the symbolic proof that this was the place where the traveller in the parable was beaten by the robbers.

== History ==
=== Israelites ===
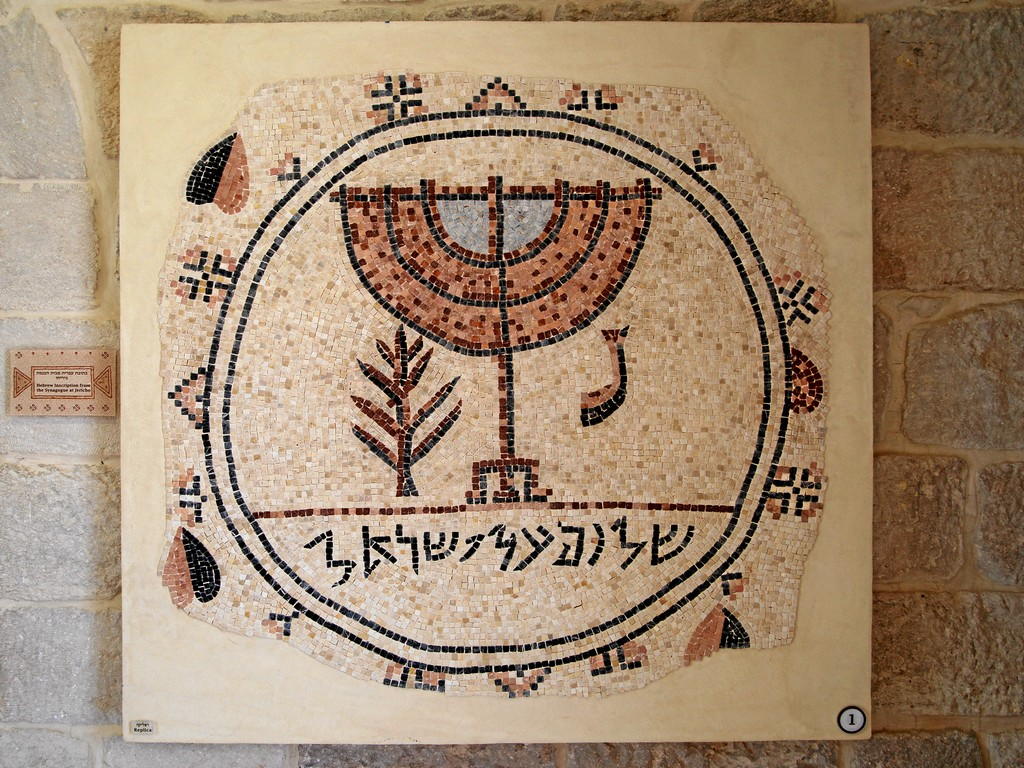
Replica of a mosaic from the Jericho synagogue, depicting a menorah from the Jewish Temple in Jerusalem, alongside the inscription "Peace upon Israel"

The Iron Age Israelites called this area Maale Adumim, "ascent of Adummim" or "Red Ascent" (Josh. 15:7, 18:17), due to the red rocks seen here, and it was part of the Kingdom of Judea and part of the territory of the ancient Jewish tribe of Binyamin, and was located along the Israelite road between Jerusalem and Jericho. The site marked the border between the territory of the Tribe of Judah and the Tribe of Benjamin.

=== Late Roman and Byzantine periods ===
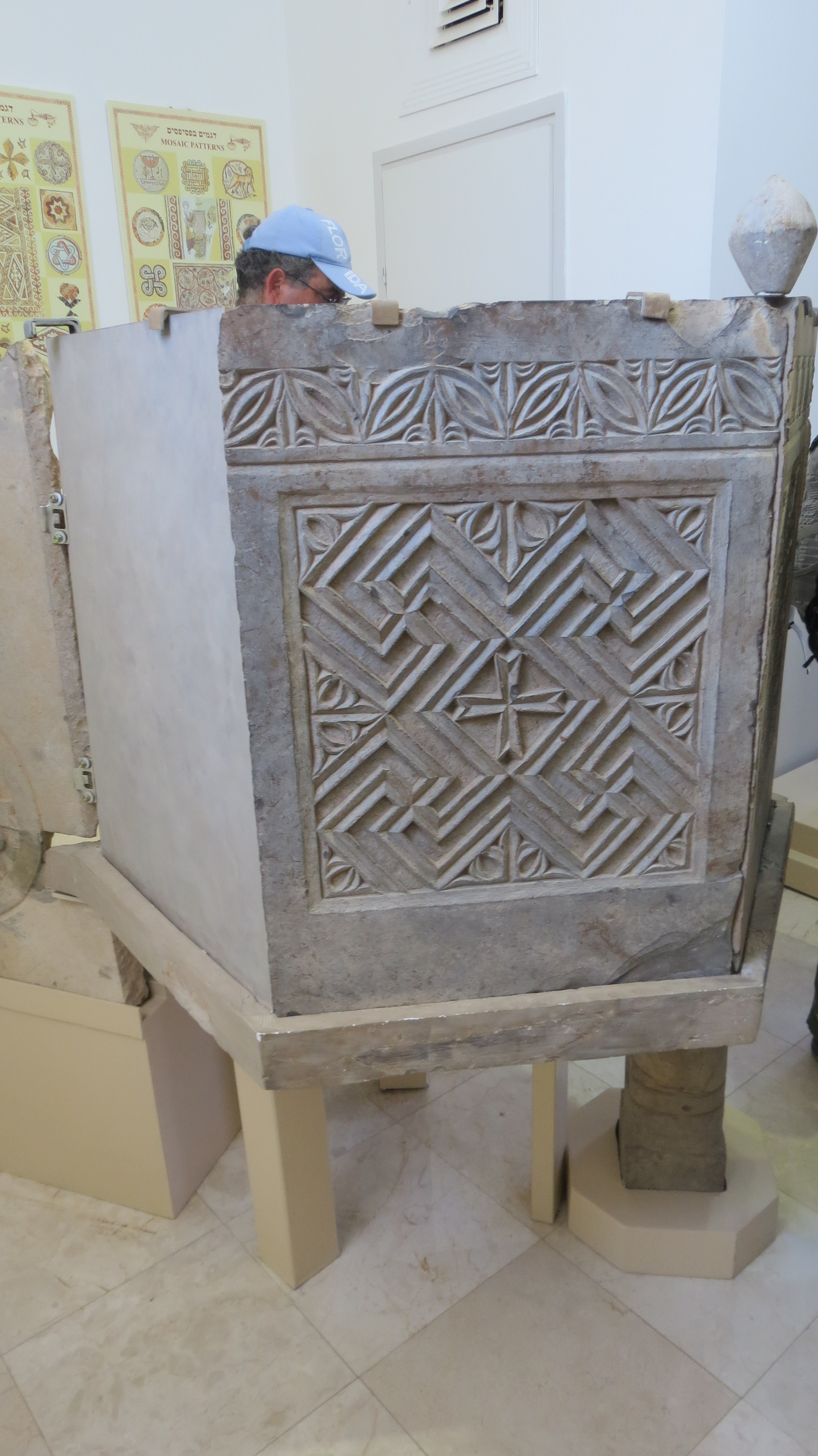
Byzantine-era ambo from Khirbet Beit Sila

Eusebius, writing before 324 CE, mentions the Late Roman fort of Maledomni, whose traces have disappeared under a Crusader castle, the Templar's Maldoim. The fort was already standing by 331, and around 400 it was garrisoned by Cohors I Salutaris, a Roman (Byzantine) auxiliary unit commissioned with protecting the travellers. Under the protection of the fortified place, a caravanserai was established. In 385, St Jerome accompanied his benefactress, the Roman patrician Paula, on her pilgrimage to Jericho, and at this site recalled the parable of the merciful Samaritan, seemingly hinting at the existence there of a church and road station. He introduces the interpretation that the name Adummim, derived from the Semitic root for blood and the colour red, stems from the blood shed there by the victims of road robbers, an idea later picked up by medieval authors.

The Templar castle on the hill was probably built on top of a Byzantine structure, as suggested by a recently discovered mosaic.

In the Early Byzantine period there appears to have been a fortress at the site (4th to 5th century), replaced below it, where the khan stood & stands! The Parks probably misunderstood the archaeological reports. |date=September 2020}} in the 6th century by a square-shaped inn, erected around a central courtyard, providing Christian pilgrims with rooms, water from a central cistern, and a large church for worship.

=== Crusader period ===
The Templar castle of Maldoim (also Maledoim, Adumim, Castrum Dumi, Turris Rubea, Rubea Cisterna, Rouge Cisterne; most being variations on "Red Tower"/"Red Cistern" in Latin and Medieval French), preserves the Israelite Hebrew name, Maale Adumim. The castle is mentioned by Theoderic in 1172. Its ruins stand at the hilltop dominating the site, although now it is separated from it by the modern highway. The hill is known in Arabic as Tal'at ed-Dam, "hill of blood". The protection offered by the castle had as a result the establishment of an inn, a remote precursor of the buildings we are seeing today.

=== Ayyubid and Mamluk periods ===
After the Battle of Hattin in 1187, the castle, already deserted by the Knights Templar, was occupied by Saladin's troops. A French author, writing around 1230, identifies the site as the inn where "the Samaritan carried the man". Later medieval authors start making a distinction between the khan and the castle.

Felix Fabri wrote, after his 1483–84 pilgrimage to the Holy Land, about the ruined inn of which only the dangerously weathered four walls were still standing around a small well, a rare and important landmark along the steep ascent in an arid landscape.

=== Ottoman period ===
In 1767 Giovanni Mariti, an Italian (it:Giovanni Mariti), writes of the ruin on the hill that it "is called Castle of the Samaritan, after the nearby khan...".

The Palestine Exploration Fund studied the site in 1873 and reported on the ruins of the inn:

"Khan Hathrurah — A Saracen hostel, standing on high ground, and just north of the present Jericho road. A few piers and some of the walls are still standing. On the opposite side of the road are two or three small caves, in one of which is a stone with an Arabic inscription. Cisterns, well-built and supported on arches, exist beneath the Khan, and contain water. North-east of this, on the highest part of the hill, are the remains of a strong fortress, which commands the road here, ascending through a narrow pass between walls of rock on the east. On the west also there is a winding ascent to the neighborhood of the Khan. The rock, especially on the west, is of a ruddy color like burnt brick, whence the title, Tal'at ed Damm, 'Ascent of Blood ', is applied to the whole hill, and sometimes to the castle on the summit".

The khan was rebuilt in its present shape in 1903.

== The Good Samaritan Museum of Mosaics ==
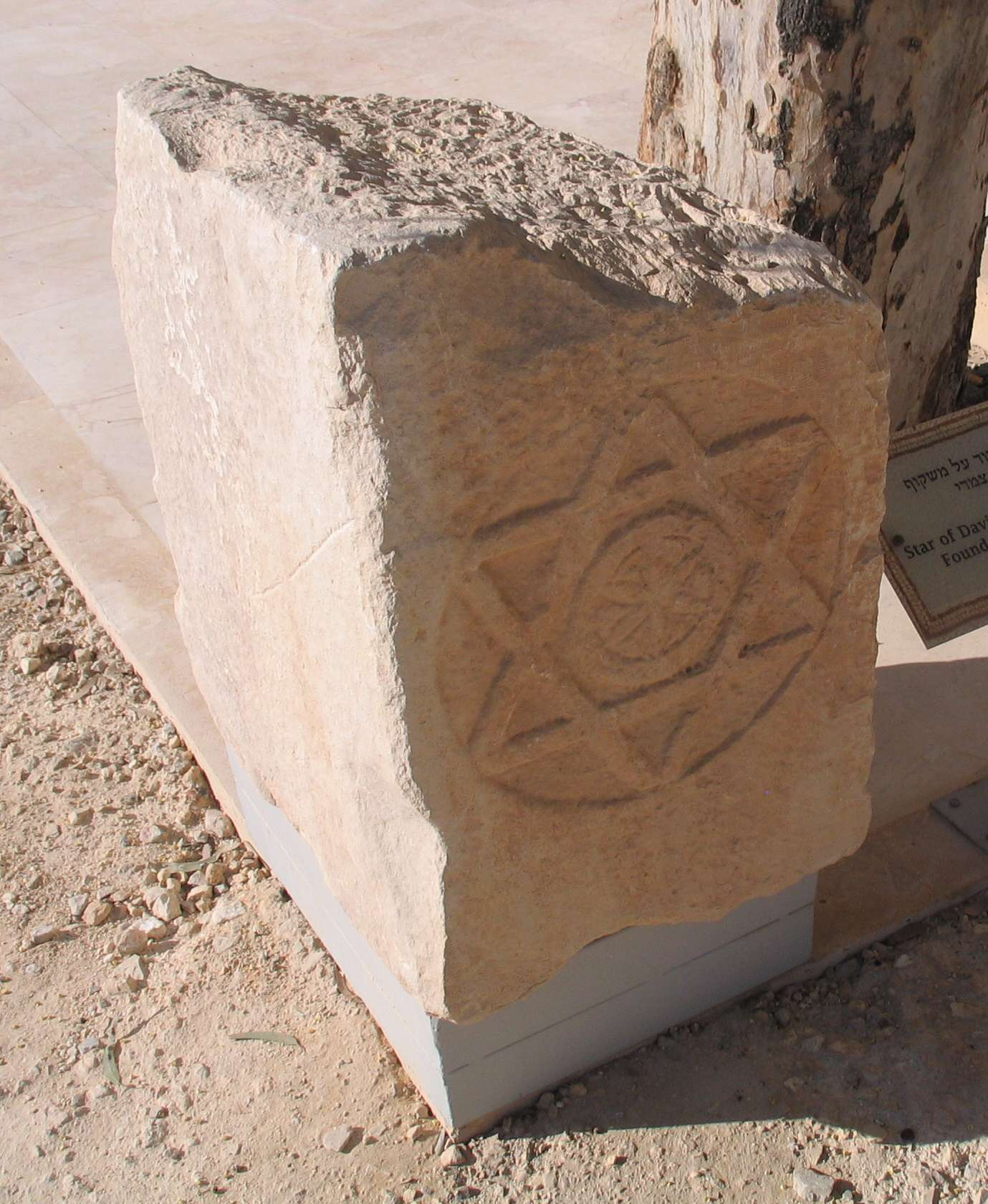
A cornerstone depicting a hexagram, similar to the Star of David

Stunning geometric patterns, inscriptions in Hebrew and Greek, an image of King David, and a variety of classic Jewish symbols (menorah, shofar, incense pan, lulav, and so on) are among the motifs that populate the mosaics on display. Some of the exhibits are outdoors, others in the (air-conditioned) restored Turkish inn. — Mike Rogoff, Haaretz

In 2010, a Museum of Mosaics was opened at the site. It was initiated by Yitzhak Magen, the Staff Officer for Archaeology at the Israeli Civil Administration for the Judea and Samaria Area. Magen discovered that the site had been rebuilt in several historical periods, and in every phase the site had apparently functioned as an inn for travellers. In the Byzantine period a church was also built at the site, suggesting its importance for early Christian pilgrims. The floor of the church was once decorated by a beautiful mosaic of geometric patterns that had largely disappeared in modern times. Magen decided that he and his team would restore the mosaic based on early photographs taken before the tiles had disappeared. After the successful restoration of the church's mosaic floor, it was decided to take the project further and create a mosaic museum there.

The museum contains ancient Jewish mosaic floors featuring religious iconography such as the temple menorah, lulav, and shofar as well as depictions of ancient Israelite figures such as David, that were excavated from all across what is now the West Bank.

The museum also includes a wing dedicated to the history and customs of the Samaritans, an indigenous ethnoreligious group closely related to the Jews, showcasing several mosaics, including those from the Samaritan synagogues of Khirbet Samara and el-Khirbe.

The museum displays a number of items recovered from Byzantine-period monasteries and churches, including from Beit Sila, Shiloh, and the Monastery of Martyrius.

=== Access, visitor services ===
The restored mosaic floor of the 6th-century church has been provided with benches along the ruined walls and is used for holding mass by visiting Christian groups.

== See also ==
- The ancient road from Jericho to Jerusalem followed the Ascent of Adummim, along the southern side of Wadi Qelt, past the khan, and on to the Mount of Olives ridge.

== Bibliography ==
- Conder, C.R.; Kitchener, H.H. (1883). The Survey of Western Palestine: Memoirs of the Topography, Orography, Hydrography, and Archaeology. Vol. 3. London: Committee of the Palestine Exploration Fund. (pp. 172, 207−209)
- Pringle, D. (1997). Secular buildings in the Crusader Kingdom of Jerusalem: an archaeological Gazetter. Cambridge University Press. ISBN 0521-46010-7. (grid 1841/1361) (pp. 78−79)
- Pringle, D. (1998). The Churches of the Crusader Kingdom of Jerusalem: L-Z (excluding Tyre). Vol. II. Cambridge University Press. ISBN 0-521-39037-0. (grid 1841/1386) (pp. 345− 346, 454)
