= Khirbet Beit Sila =

Archaeological site in the central West Bank

- خربة بيت سيلا (Arabic)
- Public structure

- Location within the West Bank
- 31°52′42″N 35°9′22″E
- Type: Settlement and church
- Periods: Settlement: Second Temple period (Late Hellenistic, Hasmonean, Herodian, early and middle Roman periods; Church: Byzantine period; Later reuse: Early Islamic to Ayyubid periods
- Cultures: Second Temple Judaism, Byzantine culture, Islamic culture
- Location: Near Beitunia, West Bank
- Region: Northern Judea / Benjamin (historical)

History
- Built: First half of the 2nd century BCE
- Abandoned: After the Bar Kokhba Revolt (Jewish settlement); second half of the 7th century CE (church)

Site notes
- Elevation: 650 m (2,130 ft)
- Excavation dates: 1997 (salvage excavation)
- Archaeologists: Shahar Batz, A. Reuben
- Condition: In ruins; mosaics preserved at Good Samaritan Inn

Khirbet Beit Sila is an archaeological site located south of Beitunia, in the central West Bank. It is situated in the historical Benjamin Hills area, above Nahal Modi'im and beside a secondary route that led from the Shephelah up to Jerusalem.

The settlement was founded in the first half of the 2nd century BCE, around the time of the Maccabean Revolt. In the late Second Temple period it was a Jewish settlement with a large public building and a mikveh (Jewish ritual bath). A cemetery of rock-cut tombs lay nearby. The site was partly deserted before the First Jewish Revolt and abandoned after the Bar Kokhba Revolt.

In the 6th century CE, a basilical church dedicated to Saint Theodore, a Byzantine military saint, was built on the foundations of the public building. It is known for its almost perfectly preserved mosaic floors, five Greek inscriptions and liturgical furnishings, which include two reliquaries and an ambo. The church was abandoned in the second half of the 7th century, after the Muslim conquest of the Levant. Nomads then reused the building, which stayed in use in some form until the Ayyubid period. The site was excavated in 1997 as a salvage excavation.

== Location ==
Khirbet Beit Sila is located in the western part of the historical Benjamin region, north of Jerusalem, about 2 kilometres (1.2 mi) south of Beitunia. It stands about 650 metres (2,130 ft) above sea level, on the northern bank of the Nahal Modi'im stream. The road alongside its riverbed climbed from the Judean Lowlands (Shephelah) to the central highlands and served as a secondary, less exposed route to Jerusalem. The ruins form two clusters around 350 metres (1,150 ft) apart, of which the eastern cluster is the larger. About 250 metres (820 ft) to the northwest, a cemetery including seventeen rock-cut tombs from the Second Temple period was documented.

In the 1920s, A. T. Richardson suggested identifying Khirbet Beit Sila with biblical Shiloh, based on the similarity of the names. However, Shiloh is now identified with Tel Shiloh.

== History ==
=== Second Temple period ===
The settlement was probably founded in the first half of the 2nd century BCE, on the eve of the Maccabean Revolt or shortly afterward. The earliest coin from the site was minted under the Seleucid king Antiochus III (r. 223–187 BCE), who conquered Coele-Syria, including Judea, from the Ptolemies. The coin was found in the foundations of a public building, which is therefore dated to the first half of the 2nd century BCE. Coins of Herod the Great (r. 37–4 BCE), Herod Archelaus (r. 4 BCE–6 CE) and Agrippa I (r. 41–44 CE) were found near the building's walls. The coins and pottery indicate that the building was in use from the 2nd century BCE into the 1st century CE.

The public building's walls were built of dressed fieldstones, except for one wall cut into the bedrock. The building contained several rooms, and its southern entrance opened onto an alley. West of the building was a large open courtyard, which contained a stepped mikveh (Jewish ritual bath) with a feed channel and, nearby, a large cistern about 7 metres (23 ft) deep. A rock-cut cave east of the building was apparently used for storage.

One tomb in the cemetery northwest of the site has been excavated. It consists of a square chamber with a central standing pit and burial benches on three sides. Two pits cut into one bench held human bones. Two juglets found in the tomb indicate that it is the oldest in the cemetery, and it is the only one that was not reused for later burials. Archaeologists Amos Kloner and Yehiel Zelinger cite the tomb as evidence that Jerusalem's burial practices influenced the surrounding region. Tombs of this kind, built in the Hasmonean period, continued the plan of bench tombs used in the First Temple period (before 587/6 BCE). Like other Jewish settlements in the Benjamin region, the site was partly deserted on the eve of the First Jewish Revolt and was finally abandoned after the Bar Kokhba Revolt.

=== Byzantine period ===
The site was resettled in the Byzantine period.

==== Church ====
In the early 6th century, a Byzantine church was built on the foundations and outer walls of the Second Temple-era building, and reused some of its stones as flagstones. The church features a basilica plan, including an atrium, a narthex, a prayer hall divided by columns with Byzantine capitals into a nave and two aisles, and a chancel flanked by two side rooms. All in all, it measures about 19 metres (62 ft) by 11.5 metres (38 ft). One column was found still standing, and bears an incised cross at whose centre part of a bronze cross survives. Fragments of secco wall painting survive, the largest of which shows a grapevine. The northern pastophorium served as baptistery and contains a built limestone baptismal font.

The church is dated to the 6th century based on a coin of Justin I (r. 518–527) which was found beneath the floor of the narthex. The main dedicatory inscription, a mosaic panel set in a tabula ansata in front of the bema, gives no year; it is also dated on paleographic grounds to no later than the first third of the 6th century. It names Saint Theodore as the church's patron, a military martyr popular in the Palestine region, and records that the church was built by a priest named Peter, who credits the saint's favour for his ability to pay for the church's main body and apse. The inscription records that relics were deposited in the church on 10 November, which accords with the reliquaries found at the site. The day appears to have mattered more than the year, since it marked the anniversary celebrated each year. The last lines extend beyond the frame, which may be because the date was added at the last moment, when the church was ready for its inauguration.

A short, partly monogrammed inscription at the main entrance reads "offering of John". Epigrapher Leah Di Segni takes it to mean that John paid for the nave mosaic, while Peter paid for the building itself. The site's excavator, Shahar Batz, instead understood the monogram as honouring the donor of the funds for building the church.

Lintel with a carved cross

The church went through two main building stages. In the second stage, the chancel was enlarged and entirely repaved, and the altar and reliquary were replaced. The inscribed stone fittings of the altar and the ambo date to somewhat later in the 6th century. Di Segni suggests they may have been ordered from workshops that followed fashion more closely than the village craftsmen who laid the mosaics. Alternatively, she proposes that the church may first have been fitted out with only the essentials and furnished more richly later.

===== Mosaics =====
The church's mosaic floors are almost perfectly preserved. The two building stages differ clearly in quality. The first-stage floors of the prayer hall and side rooms are fairly coarse and use only three colours: white, red and black. The second-stage chancel floor, the finest in the church, is laid with smaller stones in eight colours.

Mosaics from Beit Sila, on display at the Good Samaritan Inn

The prayer halls feature geometric mosaics. The main nave carpet is a grid of diamonds. The southern aisle has a central medallion of interlaced squares. Six panels laid between the columns each carry a different pattern. A schematic cross recurs throughout the design of the chancel floor. The apse floor has two rows of interlocking medallions. The central medallion of the outer row shows an amphora on a three-legged stand, with a bird on either side turned toward it. The other medallions show a bunch of grapes, a pomegranate, flowers and water birds. The central medallion of the inner row holds the head of a fish, a prominent Christian symbol.

==== Chancel and furniture ====
In the first stage, a single step separated the chancel from the nave. The chancel contained a marble altar table on four colonnettes with lotus-decorated capitals, and a two-compartment limestone reliquary stood in a niche at the altar. In the second stage, the chancel was extended a short distance westward and closed off with a decorated marble chancel screen. A new altar table was installed. The old table was reused as an offering table in a corner of the chancel, and pieces of its broken base were reused elsewhere in the church.

The marble slab of the altar base found at the site commemorates six Christ-loving "brothers" (not religious brothers) named Peter, John, Mary, Anastasia, Mary and Andrew. Di Segni suggests they were either real siblings or members of the same village community. It is impossible to say whether Peter and John are the donors named in the mosaics. Fragments of the altar table record a vow by a man whose name began with Chry-, probably Chrysippus. This Greek name points to a different cultural background from the plain Christian names of the other donors, though not necessarily a different ethnic one.

The limestone reliquary was moved to a plastered niche in the northern wall of the prayer hall. A marble reliquary in the form of a miniature sarcophagus took its place. It was found in place beneath the altar, still fastened with its bronze clasps. Inside it was a single brown hair, which the excavator suggests may be a relic of a saint, perhaps of the church's patron.

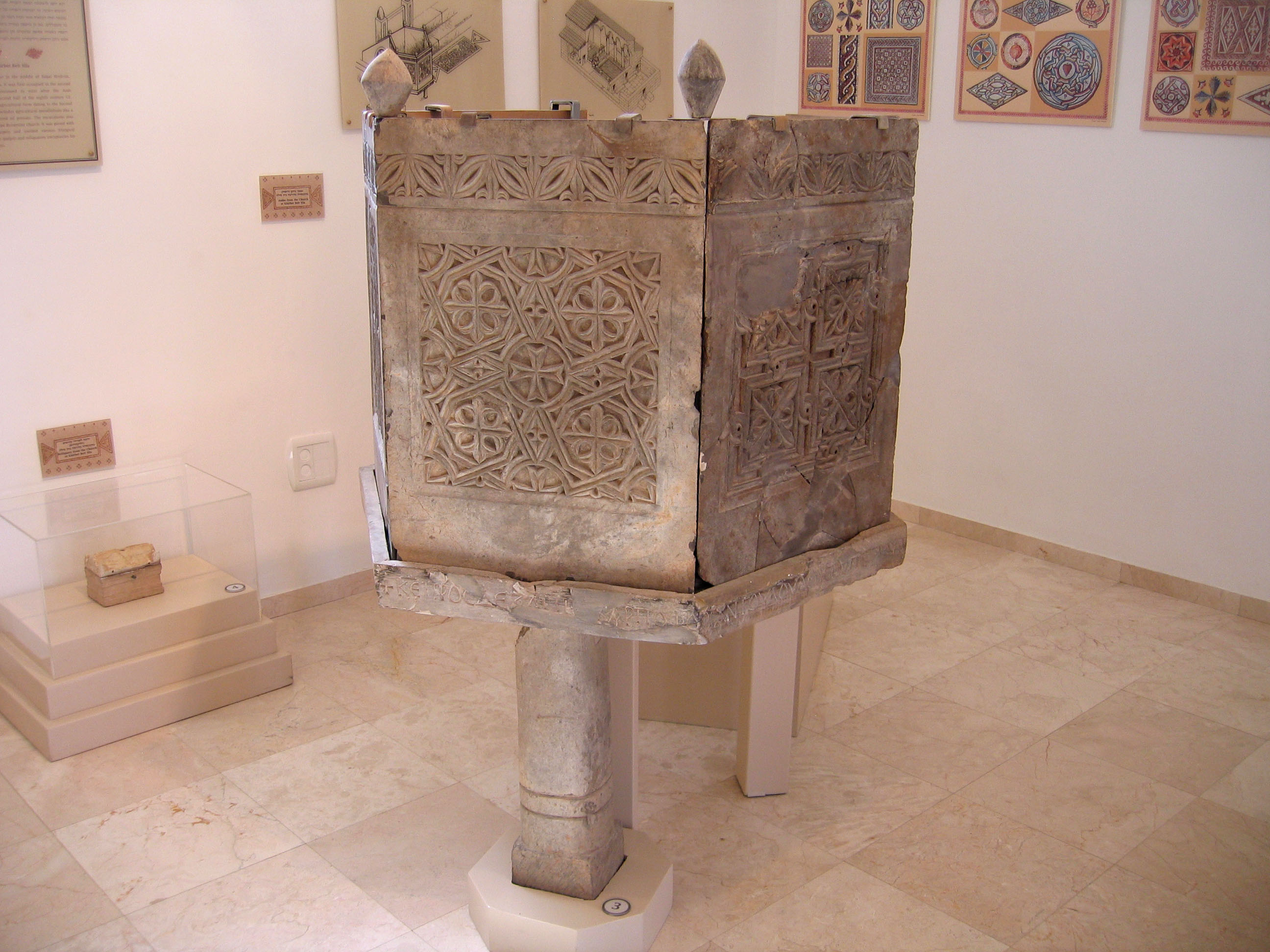
The ambo, Good Samaritan Inn

A hexagonal ambo of bituminous chalk stood at the northwestern corner of the bema. It was reached from the bema by a wooden ramp with stone railings. Unlike most ambos, its supporting colonnettes were set directly into the mosaic floor rather than on a stone base. Its carved panels are the most richly decorated objects in the church, and their dark colour makes them resemble woodwork. The base of the ambo carries a standard dedicatory formula asking God to accept the offering of Peter the priest.

==== Other constructions ====
A Byzantine-era building with stone pillars was constructed over the Second Temple-era mikveh and cistern. It had two phases and included an upper storey. Remains of stoves and 6th- and 7th-century cooking vessels were found inside. A rare silver plaque with openwork decoration, which once held a small mirror, was found in its western part.

A vaulted burial chamber was built northwest of the church, in front of the entrance to the Second Temple-era building. It held eight burials in three troughs made of reused stone slabs.

=== Early Islamic to Ayyubid periods ===
The church was abandoned in the second half of the 7th century, following the Muslim conquest. Afterward, the building appears to have been occupied casually.

The newcomers made several changes. They built makeshift installations and a small lime kiln in the narthex. Wooden church furnishings may have been burned as fuel. They also blocked the doorways between the narthex and the prayer hall with the ambo's stone screen panels. Additionally, twelve graves were dug near the atrium; their crude construction may point to a nomadic population. Two oil presses were also built at the site.

Olive oil press

Coins from the 7th century through the reign of Ayyubid sultan al-Kamil (1227–1238) show that the building was still in use in the 13th century. At some point after the church had been abandoned, an earthquake damaged it. The debris of two arches of the southern colonnade was found in the nave.

== Research history ==
The site was surveyed in the 1990s as part of the archaeological survey of the Land of Benjamin. Excavations, headed by Shahar Batz and A. Reuben on behalf of the Staff Officer of Archaeology of the Civil Administration, took place in late 1997 as part of a salvage project ahead of work on Road 45. The dedicatory inscription, which mentions 10 November, was uncovered on that same date in 1997. Batz also excavated a Second Temple-era tomb.

== See also ==
- Bir ed-Duwali
- El-Khirbe
- Khirbet Beit Lei
- Khirbet el-Lattatin
- Khirbet Samara
- Monastery of Martyrius

== Bibliography ==
=== Sources ===
- Batz, Shahar (2004). "כנסיית תיאודורוס הקדוש בחורבת בית סילה" [The Church of St. Theodore at Ḥ. Beit Sila]. Qadmoniot (in Hebrew). 37 (128): 113–119. JSTOR 23682827 – via JSTOR.
- Batz, Shahar (2012). "A Byzantine Church at Khirbet Beit Sila". In Carmin, Noga (ed.). Christians and Christianity: Churches and Monasteries in Samaria and Northern Judea. Vol. III. Jerusalem: Israel Antiquities Authority; Staff Officer of Archaeology – Civil Administration of Judea and Samaria. pp. 373–408. JSTOR j.ctt1x76gvs.21.
- Di Segni, Leah (2012). "Greek Inscriptions from the Church at Khirbet Beit Sila". In Carmin, Noga (ed.). Christians and Christianity: Churches and Monasteries in Samaria and Northern Judea. Vol. III. Jerusalem: Israel Antiquities Authority; Staff Officer of Archaeology – Civil Administration of Judea and Samaria. pp. 409–416. doi:10.2307/j.ctt1x76gvs.22. JSTOR j.ctt1x76gvs.22.
- Kloner, Amos; Zelinger, Yehiel (2007). "The Evolution of Tombs from the Iron Age through the Second Temple Period". In Crawford, Sidnie White; et al. (eds.). Up to the Gates of Ekron: Essays on the Archaeology and History of the Eastern Mediterranean In Honor of Seymour Gitin. Jerusalem: W. F. Albright Institute of Archaeological Research, Israel Exploration Society. pp. 209–220.
