= Bir ed-Duwali =

Archaeological site in the central West Bank

- Kh. Bir ed-Dawali, Kh. 'Awaad
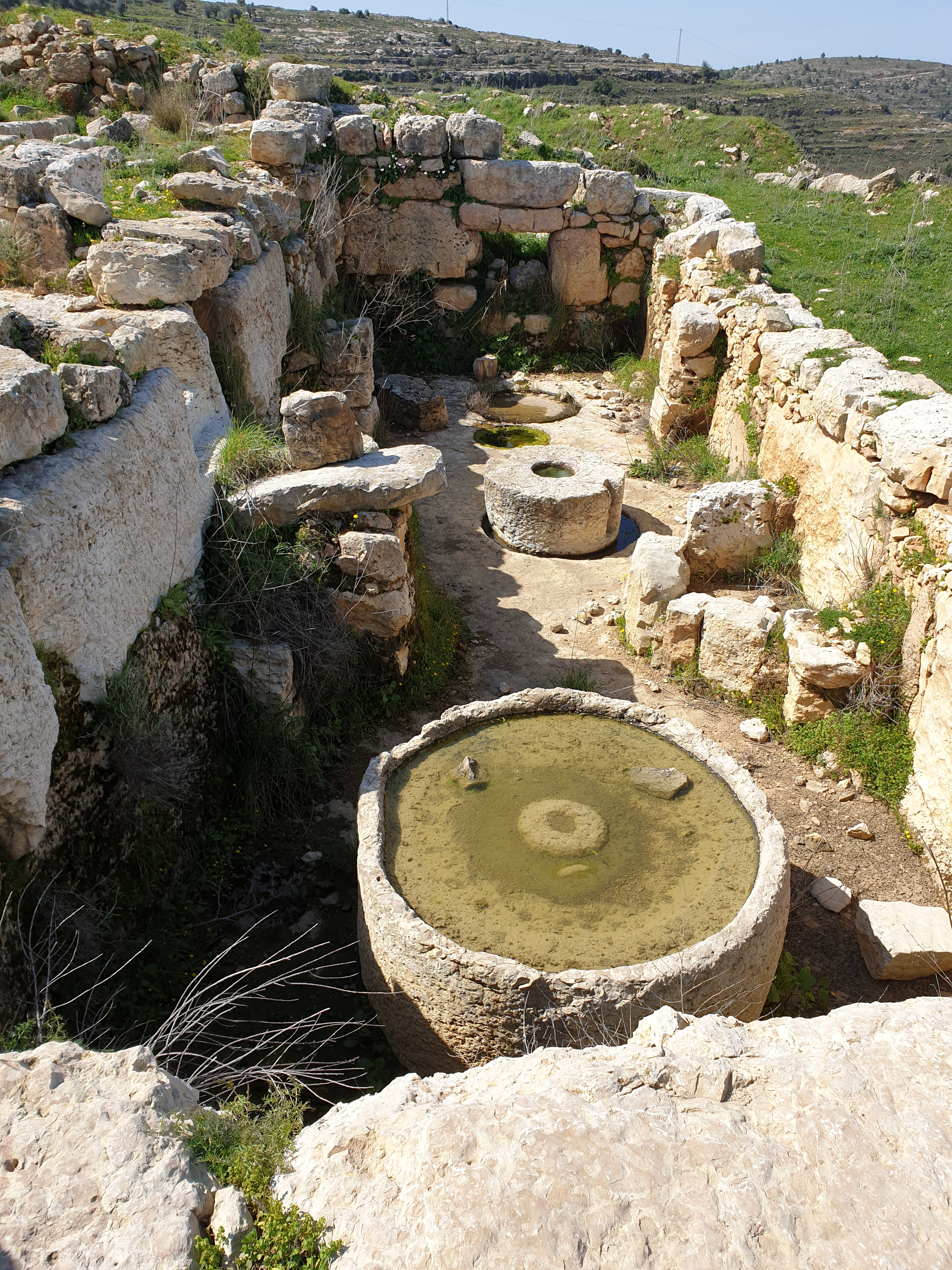
- Olive-press complex, Bir ed-Duwali

- Location within the West Bank
- 31°53′18″N 35°09′43″E
- Type: village
- Periods: Hellenistic, Roman periods (Jewish village); Late Roman, Byzantine, Early Islamic periods (resettled)
- Cultures: Second Temple Judaism
- Location: West Bank
- Region: Judaean Mountains Benjamin (historical)
- Palestine grid: 165/143

History
- Built: 2nd century BCE (Jewish village)
- Abandoned: c. 67 CE (Jewish village)
- Event: First Jewish–Roman War

Site notes
- Height: 780 m (2,560 ft)
- Area: 0.1 km^{2} (0.039 sq mi)
- Excavation dates: 1994–2005
- Archaeologists: Zechariah Kallai, Israel Finkelstein, Benjamin Har-Even, Tzur Abeles, Hanania Hizmi
- Condition: In ruins

Bir ed-Duwali, Kh. Bir ed-Dawali or Kh. 'Awaad is an archaeological site located on the southwestern slopes of Beitunia, West Bank, just north of Giv'at Ze'ev. Founded in the Hasmonean period, likely under John Hyrcanus, it was a Jewish rural settlement of the Second Temple period, occupied through the Hellenistic and early Roman phases until its destruction in 67 CE during the First Jewish–Roman War; the site was reoccupied in the Late Roman, Byzantine, and Early Islamic periods.

Excavations uncovered the remains of several houses, five Jewish ritual baths (mikva'ot), a colonnaded public building, a lever-and-weight (beam) olive press, a pottery workshop, and evidence of stone-vessel production; more than 300 bronze coins were recovered, including hoards from the revolt's second year. Approximately 1 km west of the site, an ancient cemetery serving the settlement contained the remains of 51 individuals interred in kokhim.

== Geography ==
The site lies on the southwestern slopes of Beitunia and a few miles north of Giv'at Ze'ev, approx. 780 metres (2,560 ft) above sea level, on a ridge whose summit reaches 820 metres (2,690 ft) above sea level. The ridge on which the site stands is bounded to the south by Nahal Modi'im (the Modi'in Stream). The site covers roughly 100 dunams (about 10 hectares).

== History ==
Bir ad-Duwali was a Jewish rural settlement of the Second Temple period, flourishing in the Hellenistic and early Roman eras. Founded under the Hasmonean ruler John Hyrcanus I in the later 2nd century BCE, it endured until its destruction in the second year of the First Jewish–Roman War (c. 67 CE). This trajectory mirrors a broader pattern in the historical Benjamin region (modern central West Bank), where textual sources and archaeology alike point to intensified settlement and prosperity through this time, up to Jerusalem's destruction in 70 CE.

After a period of abandonment, the site was reoccupied in the Late Roman period, followed by renewed habitation in the Byzantine and Early Islamic periods.

== Archaeology ==
=== Structures ===
In one excavation area, a residential building was uncovered; in one of its rooms, a destruction layer yielded a coin from the second year of the First Jewish–Roman War. North of this building, a ritual bath (mikveh) was exposed. Additional dwellings were discovered elsewhere on the site, likewise adjacent to ritual baths. At the summit of the ridge, additional building remains were uncovered together with another mikveh featuring two openings separated by a hewn pillar. A plastered forecourt fronts the installation; inside, a twin staircase descends to the floor, divided by a low, hewn partition that separates the mikveh into two sections.

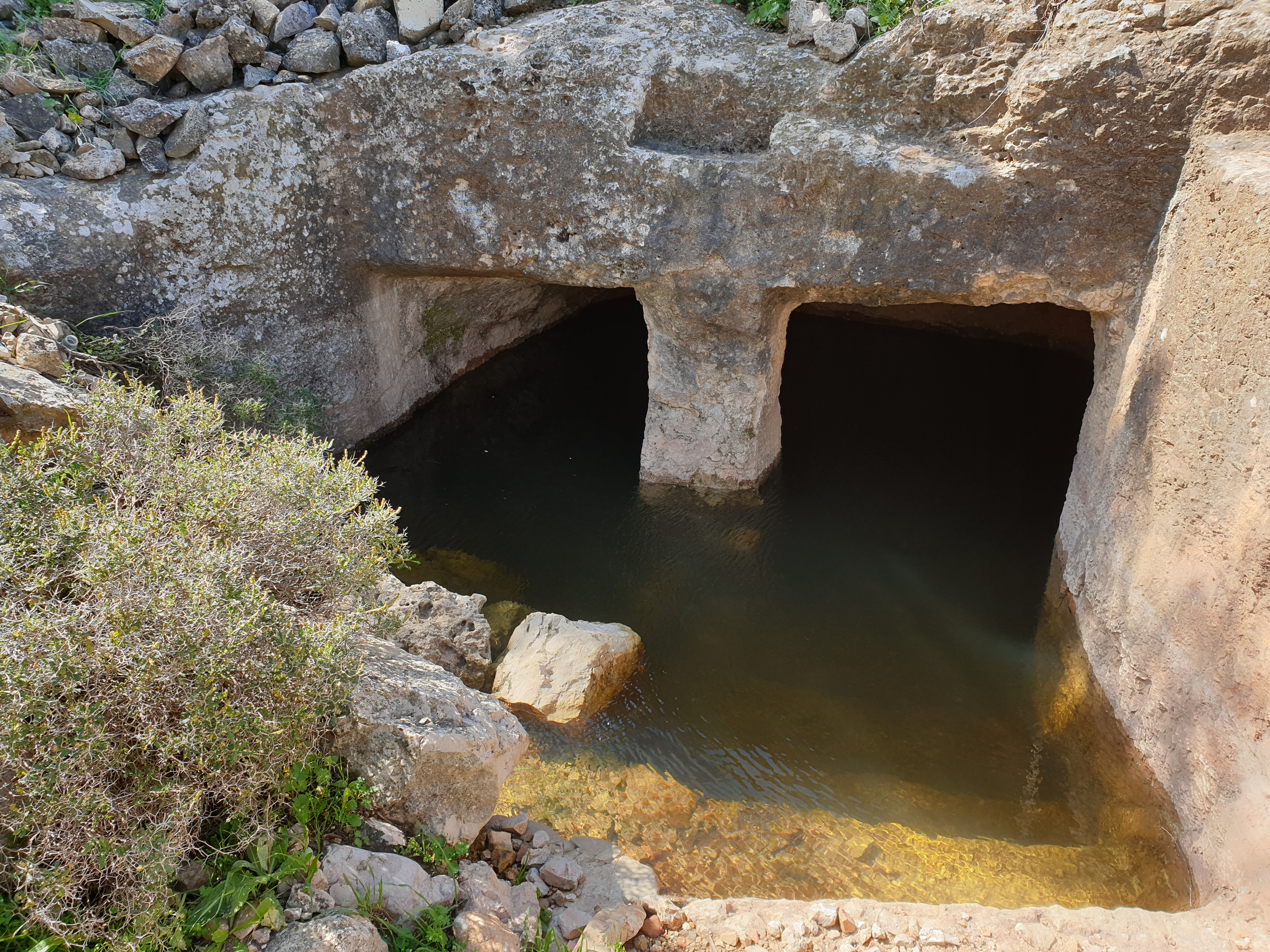
Mikveh (Jewish ritual bath) with two openings at the summit of the ridge

A large rectangular, colonnaded building measuring c. 9 metres (30 ft) × 17 metres (56 ft) was also unearthed. It was likely a public structure, though its precise function is uncertain due to the limited remains. The building is dated to the Second Temple period. North of it, a lever-and-weight (beam) olive press of roughly 100 square metres (1,100 sq ft) was exposed, and nearby another mikveh.

East of the colonnaded building, the remains of five domestic structures were found, differing in plan. In one, three clay ovens (tabuns), smashed ceramic vessels, and another burn layer were recorded. Farther east, three rock-hewn pits about 50 centimetres (20 in) deep were uncovered; one contained debitage from stone-vessel manufacture. South of the colonnaded building stood a rectangular pottery workshop with a main kiln, a smaller auxiliary furnace, and a water cistern; wasters from nearby indicate production in the first century CE. Overall, the presence of five mikva'ot alongside stone vessels underscores the community's emphasis on ritual purity, a central feature of Jewish life in the Second Temple era.

=== Finds ===
More than 300 bronze coins were recovered, ranging from the reign of the Hasmonean ruler John Hyrcanus (late 2nd century BCE) to the second year of the First Jewish Revolt. In one house, a hoard of about one hundred coins from the revolt's second year was found on the floor of a room, while another coin from the same year was found in a destruction layer in another house. Among the finds were also two Herodian-era Tyrian sheqels and half-sheqels, high-value currencies that were frequently imported, dating to 5/6 CE and 36/7 CE. In addition to soft chalk stone vessels (evidence for local production and possibly imported raw material), the assemblage includes basalt millstones and other basalt artifacts, some bearing use-wear.

About one kilometer west of the site lies an ancient cemetery that served the settlement's inhabitants. Five burial caves were excavated, most containing narrow, arched niches (kokhim). Analysis indicates that 51 individuals, including men, women, and children, were interred in these tombs. Several skeletal elements were reasonably well preserved; morphological examination points to traits characteristic of Jewish populations of the Second Temple period, and two individuals showed evidence of anemia.

== Research history ==
Over the years, the site was surveyed by several archaeologists. The Department of Antiquities of the British Mandate reported "two rough columns and a cistern with tessellated pavement." In the 1970s and 1980s, Zechariah Kallai (published 1972) and Israel Finkelstein (visited 1983) conducted surveys. Finkelstein and colleagues noted architectural remains and ancient building stones reused as spolia in terrace walls and water cisterns; the pottery they collected was almost entirely Byzantine, with only two sherds attributable to the Hellenistic and Roman periods. Later, Benjamin Har-Even conducted another survey and likewise recorded building remains, terraces incorporating dressed stones, parts of an olive press, cisterns, and additional agricultural installations. Pottery from the Hellenistic, Roman, Byzantine, and Early Islamic periods was also identified.

Between 1994 and 2005, three excavation seasons were carried out at the site: the first by Tzur Abeles and the two others by Hanania Hizmi.

== See also ==
- Horvat Diab
- Khirbet al-Biyar
- Khirbet Badd 'Isa
- Khirbet Beit Sila

== Bibliography ==
- Ariel, Donald T.; Fontanille, Jean-Philippe (2012). "Gold and Silver Coins During Herod's Reign". The Coins of Herod: A Modern Analysis and Die Classification. Ancient Judaism and Early Christianity. Vol. 79. Brill. pp. 29–42. ISBN 978-90-04-20801-8.
- Finkelstein, Israel; Lederman, Zvi; Bunimovitz, Shlomo (1997). Highlands of Many Cultures: The Southern Samaria Survey—The Sites, Vol. 1. Monograph Series. Jerusalem: Institute of Archaeology, Tel Aviv University. pp. 338–339. ISBN 965-440-007-3.
- Hizmi, Hananiah (2011). "Bir ed-Duwali—A Jewish Village of the Second Temple Period in the Land of Benjamin / ביר א-דוולי - כפר יהודי מתקופת הבית השני בארץ בנימין". Qadmoniot: A Journal for the Antiquities of Eretz-Israel and Bible Lands / קדמוניות: כתב-עת לעתיקות ארץ-ישראל וארצות המקרא (in Hebrew). מד (142): 88–94. ISSN 0033-4839. JSTOR 23685822.
