= Cantarini =

Cantarini is an Italian surname. Notable people with the surname include:

- Chayyim Moses ben Isaiah Azriel Cantarini (fl. 1677), Italian physician, rabbi, poet, and writer
- Giorgio Cantarini (born 1992), Italian actor
- Isaac Chayyim Cantarini (a.k.a. Isaacus Viva; 1644–1723), Italian poet, writer, and physician
- Judah ben Samuel ha-Kohen Cantarini (c. 1650–1694), Italian physician and rabbi
- Simone Cantarini (a.k.a. Simone da Pesaro; 1612–1648), Italian painter and etcher
