= Second Temple =

Temple in Jerusalem (c. 516 BCE–70 CE)

Second Temple Herod's Temple
- בֵּית־הַמִּקְדָּשׁ הַשֵּׁנִי
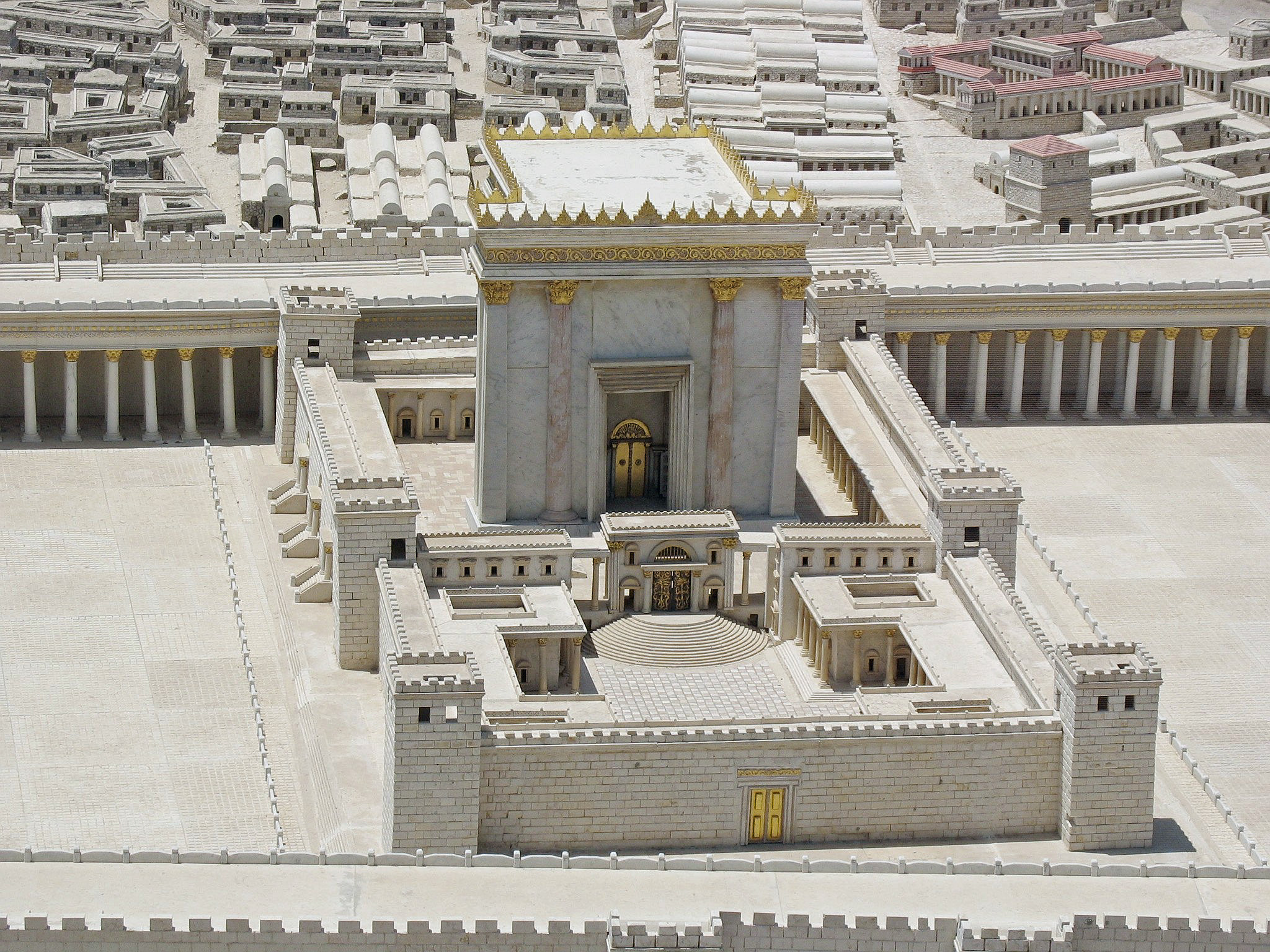
- Model of Herod's Temple (inspired by the writings of Josephus) displayed within the Holyland Model of Jerusalem at the Israel Museum

- Location within the Old City of Jerusalem Location within Jerusalem (modern municipal borders) Location within the State of Israel

Religion
- Affiliation: Judaism
- Region: Land of Israel
- Deity: Yahweh
- Leadership: High Priest of Israel

Location
- Location: Temple Mount
- Municipality: Jerusalem
- State: Yehud Medinata (first); Judaea (last)
- Country: Achaemenid Empire (first); Roman Empire (last)
- Coordinates: 31°46′41″N 35°14′07″E

Architecture
- Founder: Zerubbabel; refurbished by Herod the Great
- Completed: c. 516 BCE or 450-400 BCE (original) c. 18 CE (Herodian)
- Destroyed: 70 CE (Roman siege)

Specifications
- Height (max): c. 46 metres (151 ft)
- Materials: Jerusalem limestone
- Excavation dates: 1930, 1967, 1968, 1970–1978, 1996–1999, 2007
- Archaeologists: Charles Warren, Benjamin Mazar, Ronny Reich, Eli Shukron, Yaakov Billig
- Present-day site: Dome of the Rock
- Public access: Limited; see Temple Mount entry restrictions

The Second Temple (Hebrew: בֵּית־הַמִּקְדָּשׁ הַשֵּׁנִי, romanized: Bēṯ hamMīqdāš hašŠēnī, lit. 'Second House of the Sanctum') was the temple in Jerusalem that replaced Solomon's Temple, which was destroyed during the Babylonian siege of Jerusalem in 587 BCE. The Second Temple was constructed either around 516 BCE or between 450 and 400 BCE and later enhanced by Herod the Great around 18 BCE, consequently also being known as Herod's Temple thereafter. Defining the Second Temple period and standing as a pivotal symbol of Jewish identity, it was the basis and namesake of Second Temple Judaism. The Second Temple served as the chief place of worship, ritual sacrifice (korban), and communal gathering for the Jewish people, among whom it regularly attracted pilgrims for the Three Pilgrimage Festivals: Passover, Shavuot, and Sukkot.

In 539 BCE, the Persian conquest of Babylon enabled the Achaemenid Empire to expand across the Fertile Crescent by annexing the Neo-Babylonian Empire, including the territory of the former Kingdom of Judah, which had been annexed as the Babylonian province of Yehud during the reign of the Babylonian king Nebuchadnezzar II, who concurrently exiled part of Judah's population to Babylon. Following this campaign, the Persian king Cyrus the Great issued the "Edict of Cyrus" (sometimes identified with the Cyrus Cylinder), which is described in the Hebrew Bible as a royal proclamation that authorized and encouraged the repatriation of displaced populations in the region. This event is called the return to Zion in Ezra–Nehemiah, marking the resurgence of Jewish life in what had become the self-governing Persian province of Yehud. The reign of the Persian king Darius the Great saw the completion of the Second Temple, signifying a period of renewed Jewish hope and religious revival. According to the biblical account, the Second Temple was originally a relatively modest structure built under the authority of the Persian-appointed Jewish governor Zerubbabel, who was the grandson of the penultimate Judahite king Jeconiah.

In the 1st century BCE, Herod's efforts to transform the Second Temple resulted in a grand and imposing structure and courtyard, including the large edifices and façades shown in modern models, such as the Holyland Model of Jerusalem in the Israel Museum. The Temple Mount, where both Solomon's Temple and the Second Temple stood, was also significantly expanded, doubling in size to become the ancient world's largest religious sanctuary. The Temple complex was not only a place of worship but also served multiple functions, including being a site for public assemblies. The Sanhedrin, the supreme judicial court, convened in the Temple's Hall of Hewn Stones, and the compound also hosted one of the largest marketplaces in the city.

In 70 CE, at the height of the First Jewish–Roman War, the Second Temple was destroyed by the Roman siege of Jerusalem, (Note: Based on regnal years of Darius I, brought down in Richard Parker & Waldo Dubberstein's Babylonian Chronology, 626 B.C.–A.D. 75, Brown University Press: Providence 1956, p. 30. However, Jewish tradition holds that the Second Temple stood for only 420 years, i.e. from 352 BCE – 68 CE. See: Hadad, David (2005). Sefer Maʻaśe avot (in Hebrew) (4 ed.). Beer Sheba: Kodesh Books. p. 364. OCLC 74311775. (with endorsements by Rabbi Ovadia Yosef, Rabbi Shlomo Amar, and Rabbi Yona Metzger); Sar-Shalom, Rahamim (1984). She'harim La'Luah Ha'ivry (Gates to the Hebrew Calendar) (in Hebrew). Tel-Aviv. p. 161 (Comparative chronological dates). OCLC 854906532.; Maimonides (1974). Sefer Mishneh Torah - HaYad Ha-Chazakah (Maimonides' Code of Jewish Law) (in Hebrew). Vol. 4. Jerusalem: Pe'er HaTorah. pp. 184–185 [92b–93a] (Hil. Shmitta ve-yovel 10:2–4). OCLC 122758200. "According to this calculation, this year which is one-thousand, one-hundred and seven years following the destruction, which year in the Seleucid era counting is [today] the 1,487th year (corresponding with Tishri 1175–Elul 1176 CE), being the year 4,936 anno mundi, it is a Seventh Year [of the seven-year cycle], and it is the 21st year of the Jubilee" (END QUOTE). = the destruction occurring in the lunar month of Av, two months preceding the New Year of 3,829 anno mundi.") resulting in a cataclysmic shift in Jewish history. The loss of the Second Temple prompted the development of Rabbinic Judaism, which remains the mainstream form of Jewish religious practices globally.

== History ==
=== Construction under the Persians ===
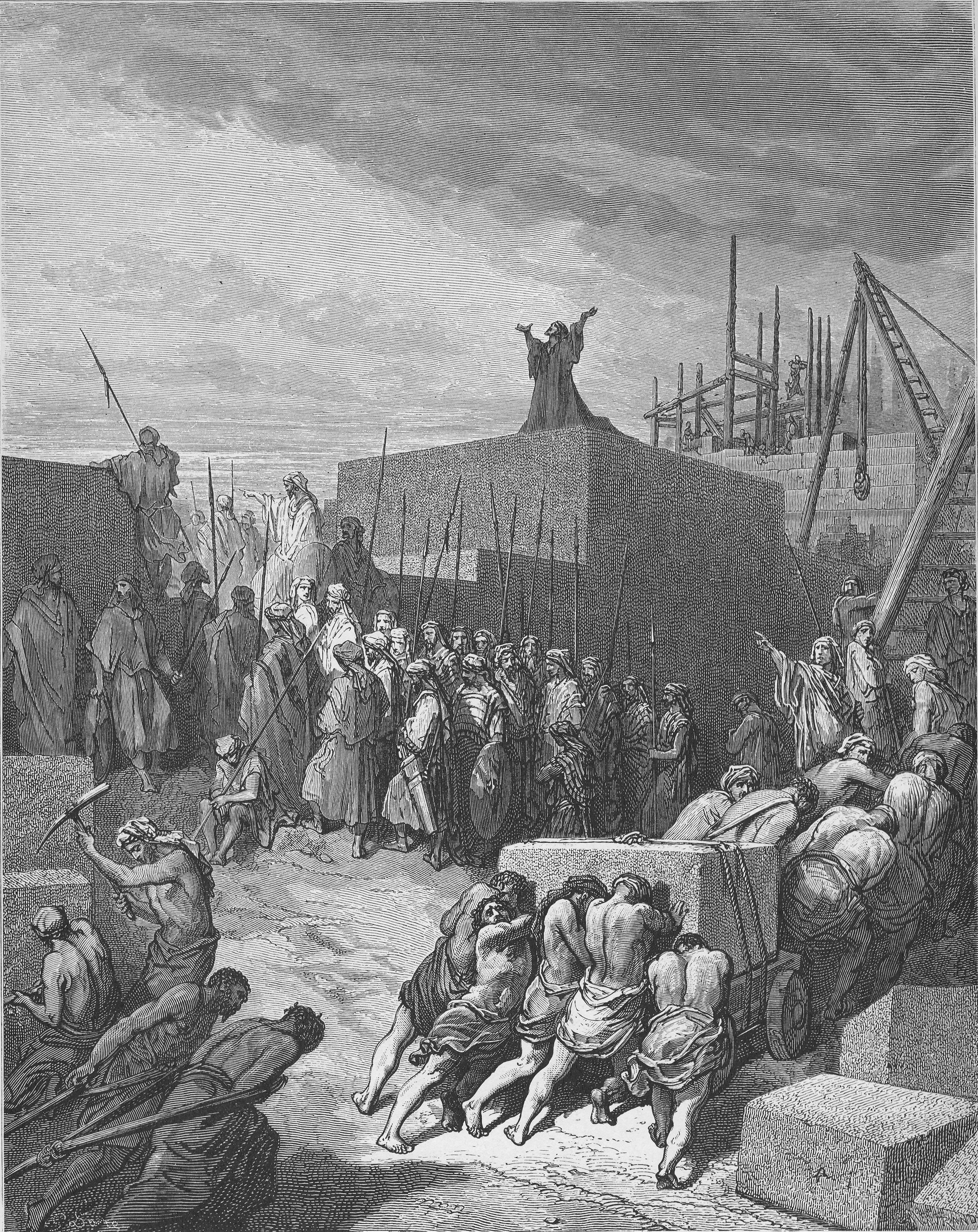
Rebuilding of the Temple (illustration by Gustave Doré from the 1866 La Sainte Bible)

The accession of Cyrus the Great of the Achaemenid Empire in 559 BCE made the re-establishment of the city of Jerusalem and the rebuilding of the Temple possible. Some rudimentary ritual sacrifice had continued at the site of the first temple following its destruction. According to the closing verses of the second book of Chronicles and the books of Ezra and Nehemiah, when the Jewish exiles returned to Jerusalem following a decree from Cyrus the Great (Ezra 1:1–4, 2 Chronicles 36:22–23), construction started at the original site of the altar of Solomon's Temple. These events represent the final section in the historical narrative of the Hebrew Bible. The original core of the book of Nehemiah, the first-person memoir, may have been combined with the core of the Book of Ezra around 400 BCE. Further editing probably continued into the Hellenistic era.

Based on the biblical account, after the return from Babylonian captivity, arrangements were immediately made to reorganize the desolated Yehud province after the demise of the Kingdom of Judah seventy years earlier. The body of pilgrims, forming a band of 42,360, having completed the long and dreary journey of some four months, from the banks of the Euphrates to Jerusalem, were animated in all their proceedings by a strong religious impulse, and therefore one of their first concerns was to restore their ancient house of worship by rebuilding their destroyed Temple.

On the invitation of Zerubbabel, the governor, who showed them a remarkable example of liberality by contributing personally 1,000 golden darics, besides other gifts, the people poured their gifts into the sacred treasury with great enthusiasm. First they erected and dedicated the altar of God on the exact spot where it had formerly stood, and they then cleared away the charred heaps of debris that occupied the site of the old temple; and in the second month of the second year (535 BCE), amid great public excitement and rejoicing, the foundations of the Second Temple were laid. A wide interest was felt in this great movement, although it was regarded with mixed feelings by the spectators.

The Samaritans wanted to help with this work but Zerubbabel and the elders declined such cooperation, feeling that the Jews must build the Temple unaided. Immediately evil reports were spread regarding the Jews. According to Ezra 4:5, the Samaritans sought to "frustrate their purpose" and sent messengers to Ecbatana and Susa, with the result that the work was suspended.

Seven years later, Cyrus the Great, who allowed the Jews to return to their homeland and rebuild the Temple, died, and was succeeded by his son Cambyses. On his death, the "false Smerdis", an impostor, occupied the throne for some seven or eight months, and then Darius became king (522 BCE). In the second year of his rule the work of rebuilding the temple was resumed and carried forward to its completion, under the stimulus of the earnest counsels and admonitions of the prophets Haggai and Zechariah. It was ready for consecration in the spring of 516 BCE, more than twenty years after the return from captivity. The Temple was completed on the third day of the month Adar, in the sixth year of the reign of Darius, amid great rejoicings on the part of all the people, although it was evident that the Jews were no longer an independent people, but were subject to a foreign power.

The Book of Haggai includes a prediction that the glory of the Second Temple would be greater than that of the first. While the Temple may well have been consecrated in 516, construction and expansion may have continued as late as 500 BCE.

Some of the original artifacts from the Temple of Solomon are not mentioned in the sources after its destruction in 586 BCE, and are presumed lost. The Second Temple lacked various holy articles, including the Ark of the Covenant containing the Tablets of Stone, before which were placed the pot of manna and Aaron's rod, the Urim and Thummim (divination objects contained in the Hoshen), the holy oil and the sacred fire. The Second Temple also included many of the original vessels of gold that had been taken by the Babylonians but restored by Cyrus the Great.

No detailed description of the Temple's architecture is given in the Hebrew Bible, save that it was sixty cubits in both width and height, and was constructed with stone and lumber. In the Second Temple, the Holy of Holies (Kodesh Hakodashim) was separated by curtains rather than a wall as in the First Temple. Still, as in the Tabernacle, the Second Temple included the Menorah (golden lamp) for the Hekhal, the Table of Showbread and the golden altar of incense, with golden censers.

=== Rededication by the Maccabees ===
Following the conquest of Judea by Alexander the Great, it became part of the Ptolemaic Kingdom of Egypt until 200 BCE, when the Seleucid king Antiochus III the Great of Syria defeated Pharaoh Ptolemy V Epiphanes at the Battle of Paneion.

In 167 BCE, Antiochus IV Epiphanes ordered an altar to Zeus erected in the Temple. He also, according to Josephus, "compelled Jews to dissolve the laws of the country, to keep their infants un-circumcised, and to sacrifice swine's flesh upon the altar; against which they all opposed themselves, and the most approved among them were put to death."

These anti-Jewish persecutions provoked the Maccabean Revolt, led by Judas Maccabeus and his brothers from the priestly Hasmonean family. After several years of guerrilla warfare, the Maccabees succeeded in driving out the Seleucid forces from Jerusalem. In 164 BCE, they recaptured the Temple Mount, removed the pagan altar, and undertook the purification and rededication of the Second Temple. This event is the origin of the Jewish festival of Hanukkah, which begins on the 25th of Kislev. The earliest accounts of the holiday appear in the Books of the Maccabees, which both associate it with the 25th of Kislev—either as the date when sacrifices resumed following the cleansing of the Temple (according to 1 Maccabees), or as the date of the cleansing itself (according to 2 Maccabees).

=== Hasmonean dynasty and Roman conquest ===
There is some evidence from archaeology that further changes to the structure of the Temple and its surroundings were made during the Hasmonean rule. Beyond physical changes to the sacred building itself, archaeological evidence reveals that the Hasmonean rulers extensively reshaped the economy and infrastructure of the surrounding countryside to directly support the Temple's daily functions and religious laws. To ensure a steady supply of ritually pure wine and olive oil for Temple ceremonies, the state developed a network of local farms equipped with rock-cut ritual baths (miqva'ot) built directly next to agricultural presses. This allowed the crops to be processed under strict Jewish purity laws from the very moment of harvest. At several of these rural sites, archaeologists discovered small, specialized crushing stones that match ancient rabbinic descriptions of extracting the highest-grade olive oil specifically for lighting the Temple Menorah. Furthermore, many of these rural estates operated large dove-raising installations (columbaria) to satisfy the massive daily demand for bird sacrifices brought by visitors. To manage the heavy traffic of these pilgrims and their sacrificial livestock approaching the holy precinct, the Hasmoneans built wide, stepped roads designed to control the massive crowds and guide them smoothly toward the Temple gates.

Judas the Essene, a prophetic figure who lived under the Hasmoneans, is depicted by Josephus as being in the Temple with his followers. Salome Alexandra, the queen of the Hasmonean Kingdom appointed her elder son Hyrcanus II as the high priest of Judaea. Her younger son Aristobulus II was determined to have the throne, and as soon as she died he seized the throne. Hyrcanus, who was next in the succession, agreed to be content with being high priest. Antipater, the governor of Idumæa, encouraged Hyrcanus not to give up his throne. Eventually, Hyrcanus fled to Aretas III, king of the Nabateans, and returned with an army to take back the throne. He defeated Aristobulus and besieged Jerusalem. The Roman general Pompey, who was in Syria fighting against the Armenians in the Third Mithridatic War, sent his lieutenant to investigate the conflict in Judaea. Both Hyrcanus and Aristobulus appealed to him for support. Pompey was not diligent in making a decision about this, which caused Aristobulus to march off. He was pursued by Pompey and surrendered but his followers closed Jerusalem to Pompey's forces. The Romans besieged and took the city in 63 BCE. The priests continued with the religious practices inside the Temple during the siege. The temple was not looted or harmed by the Romans. Pompey himself, perhaps inadvertently, went into the Holy of Holies and the next day ordered the priests to repurify the Temple and resume the religious practices.

=== Renovations under Herod ===
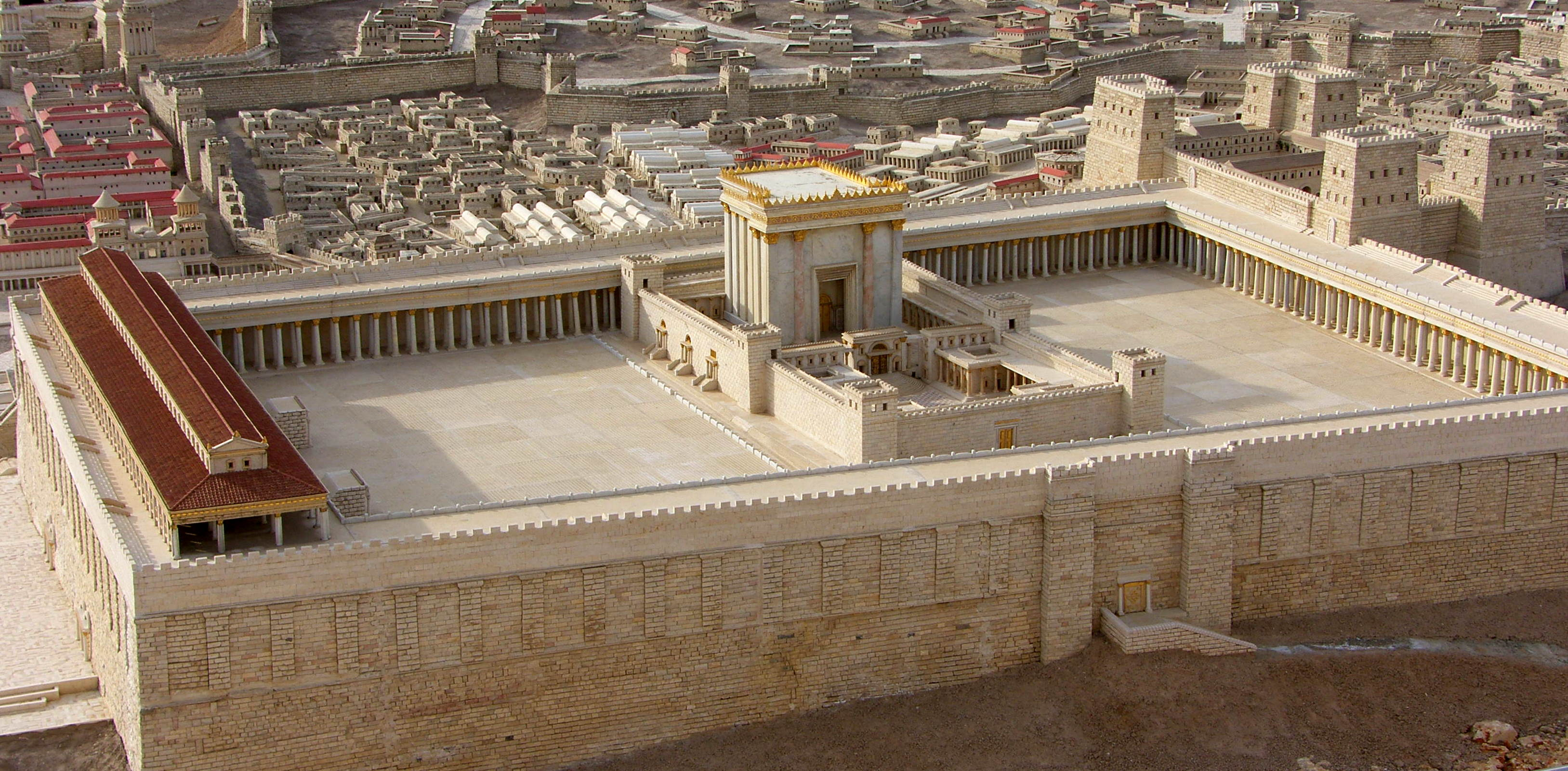
Herod's Temple as imagined in the Holyland Model of Jerusalem; east at the bottom

In c. 20/19 BCE, (Note: This dating is based on Josephus' account in Antiquities of the Jews (XV, 380), which states that construction began in Herod’s eighteenth regnal year. In The Jewish War (I, 401), he gives a different date—Herod's fifteenth year—but scholars, including Bahat, consider this less likely.) Herod, king of Judaea, began an ambitious renovation of the Second Temple. The old temple built by Zerubbabel was replaced by a magnificent edifice. Herod's Temple was one of the larger construction projects of the 1st century BCE. The expanded sanctuary was the largest of its time. Josephus records that Herod was interested in perpetuating his name through building projects, that his construction programs were extensive and paid for by heavy taxes, but that his masterpiece was the Temple of Jerusalem. Later, the sanctuary shekel was reinstituted to support the temple as the temple tax.

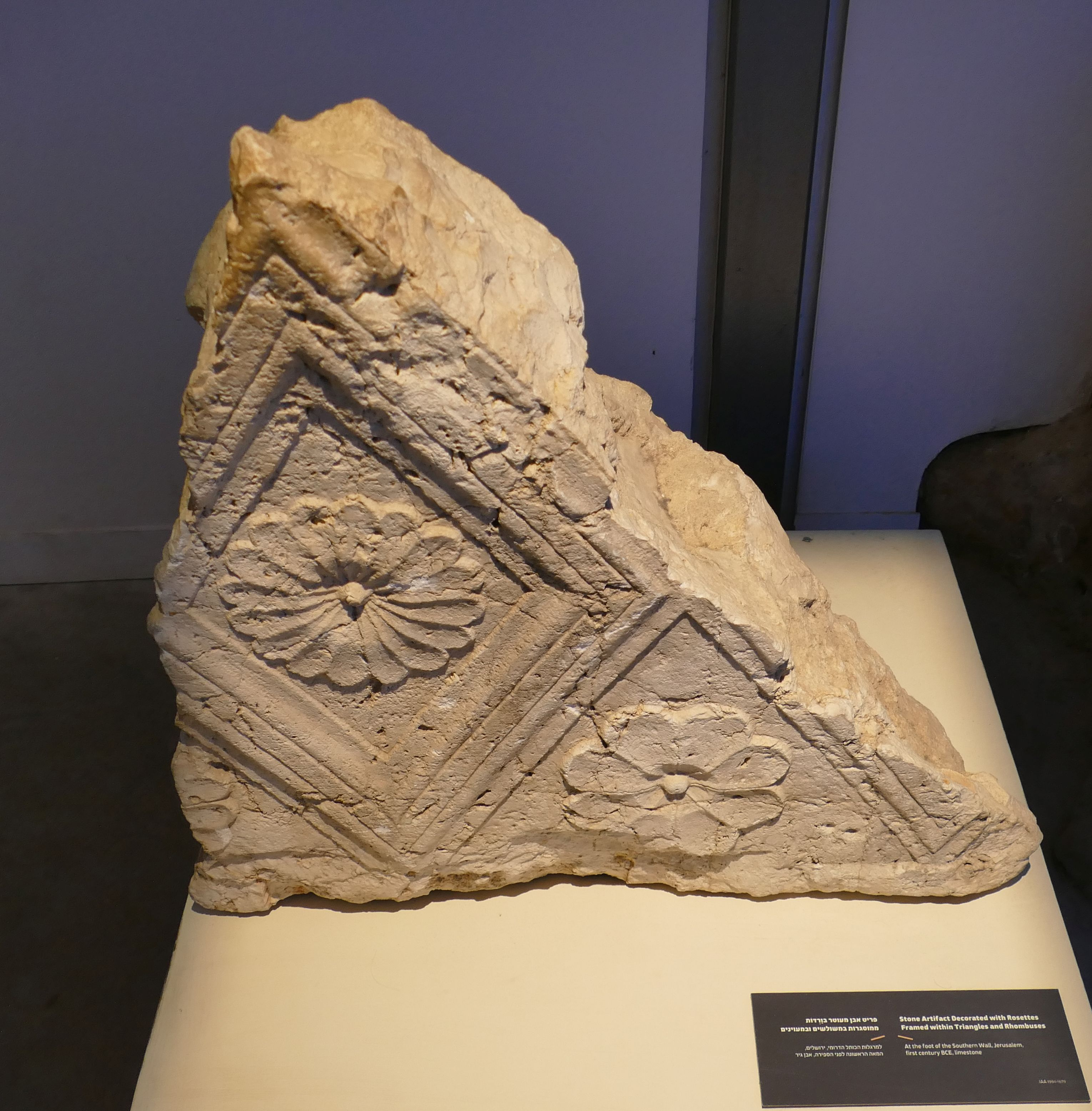
1st-century BCE relief with rosettes found beneath the Temple Mount's southern wall, now on display at the Davidson Center

According to Josephus, the construction of the Temple itself took about a year and a half, while the porticoes and outer walls required a further eight years. During the works, Herod was careful not to offend religious sensitivities: ten thousand laborers and a thousand priests were specially trained for the construction, daily offerings continued uninterrupted, and modesty partitions were erected to shield sacred rituals from view.

Both Rabbinic tradition and Josephus preserve accounts reflecting popular views that Herod's construction of the Temple was divinely supported, with miraculous signs symbolizing God's approval and guidance of the project. According to the Babylonian Talmud, "And thus we have from the days of Herod, that when they were working on the construction of the Temple, rains would fall at night. On the morrow, the winds would blow and the clouds dispersed and the sun would shine and the people would proceed with their work, and they knew that they were doing God's work." Josephus also writes: "And it is said that during the time when the Temple was being built, no rain fell during the day, but only at night, so that there was no interruption of the work. And this story, which our fathers have handed down to us, is not at all incredible if, that is, one considers the other manifestations of power given by God."

While the main structures were largely completed during Herod's reign, construction at the complex continued for decades, possibly until the 60s CE, as reflected in the New Testament's mention of 46 years of work and Josephus' reference to additions under the procurator Lucceius Albinus (c. 62–64 CE).

=== Under Roman rule ===
In 4 BCE, following the funerary ceremonies for his father Herod, Archelaus, the ethnarch of Judea, conducted hearings with his subjects while seated on a golden throne in the Temple precincts. In the early 40s CE, a major crisis erupted when the Emperor Caligula ordered that a statue of himself be installed in the Temple—a move that would have deeply violated Jewish religious beliefs prohibiting idolatry. The Jewish population in Judaea and Galilee responded with mass protests and passive resistance, including a sit-in to block the Roman army from transporting the statue. Jewish leaders also mobilized diplomatically: Philo, in Rome as part of a delegation representing the Jews of Alexandria, appealed to Caligula, while Agrippa I, a Herodian prince and confidant of the emperor, attempted to dissuade him. The crisis was ultimately averted with Caligula's assassination in 41 CE.

Descriptions of Jerusalem by non-Jews emphasize the Temple as its central feature. The 2nd-century BCE Greek historian Polybius described the Jews as a nation residing around a temple called Jerusalem, while Tacitus, a Roman historian from the first century CE, wrote that "Jerusalem is the capital of the Jews. In it was a temple possessing enormous reaches."

Religious activities around the Temple Mount during this period have been preserved by ancient sources. The Mishnah provides an eyewitness account of Yo'ezer Ish Habirah, who reports that Pharisee leader Gamaliel the Elder responded to questions from the House of Shammai while standing by the Eastern Gate of the Temple. New Testament accounts describe Jesus and the apostles preaching at the Temple, and indicate that the early Christian community in Jerusalem used to gather at Solomon's Portico, in the eastern part of the compound. The Babylonian Talmud further states that Rabban Yohanan ben Zakkai used to teach, before the Temple's destruction, "in the shadow of the sanctuary."

== In rabbinic literature ==
Traditional rabbinic literature states that the Second Temple stood for 420 years, and, based on the 2nd-century work Seder Olam Rabbah, placed construction in 356 BCE (3824 AM), 164 years later than academic estimates, and destruction in 68 CE (3828 AM). (Note: Classical Jewish records (e.g. Maimonides' Responsa, etc.) put the Second Temple period from 352 BCE to 68 CE, a total of 420 years.)

According to the Mishnah, the "Foundation Stone" stood where the Ark used to be, and the High Priest put his censer on it on Yom Kippur. The fifth order, or division, of the Mishnah, known as Kodashim, provides detailed descriptions and discussions of the religious laws connected with Temple service including the sacrifices, the Temple and its furnishings, as well as the priests who carried out the duties and ceremonies of its service. Tractates of the order deal with the sacrifices of animals, birds, and meal offerings, the laws of bringing a sacrifice, such as the sin offering and the guilt offering, and the laws of misappropriation of sacred property. In addition, the order contains a description of the Second Temple (tractate Middot), and a description and rules about the daily sacrifice service in the Temple (tractate Tamid). According to the Babylonian Talmud, the Temple lacked the Shekhinah (the dwelling or settling divine presence of God) and the Ruach HaKodesh (holy spirit) present in the First Temple.

Herod's Temple is praised in the Babylonian Talmud. In Bava Batra 4a, it states: "He who has not seen the Temple of Herod has never seen a beautiful building". Similarly, in Sukkah 51b: "He who has not seen the Temple in its full construction has never seen a glorious building in his life. Which Temple? – Abaye, or it might be said, Rabbi Hisda, replied, The reference is to the building of Herod".

The Babylonian Talmud, Sukkah 51b, provides a description of the stones used in Herod's construction of the Temple. According to the text, the 4th-century amora Rava said: "It was with stones of green-gray marble and white marble [marmara]." Others said: "It was with stones of blue marble and white marble. The rows of stones were set with one row slightly protruded and one row slightly indented, so that the plaster would take better." The passage adds that Herod "thought to plate the Temple with gold, but the Sages said to him: Leave it as is, and do not plate it, as it is better this way, as with the different colors and the staggered arrangement of the rows of stones, it has the appearance of waves of the sea."

== Architecture of Herod's Temple ==
The Second Temple in Jerusalem was remarkable for its sheer size, surpassing typical temples in the Roman Empire.

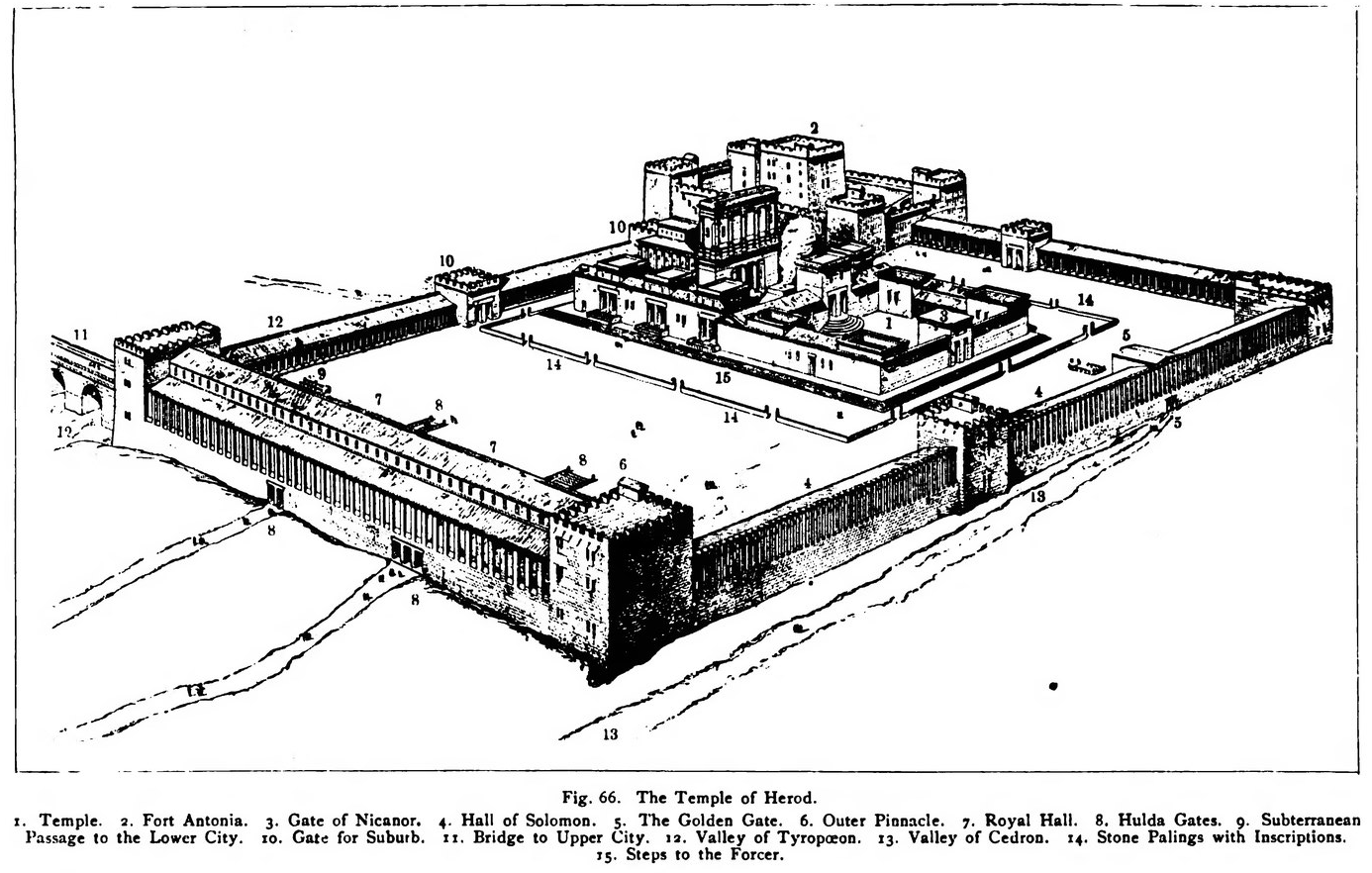
Herod's Temple, from A Practical Commentary on Holy Scripture

The writings of Flavius Josephus and the information in tractate Middot of the Mishnah had for long been used for proposing possible designs for the Temple up to 70 CE. The discovery of the Temple Scroll as part of the Dead Sea Scrolls in the 20th century provided another possible source. Lawrence Schiffman states that after studying Josephus and the Temple Scroll, he found Josephus to be historically more reliable than the Temple Scroll.

=== Temple structure ===
The Temple itself once stood on the location now occupied by the Dome of the Rock, while its gates led to areas adjacent to what would later become the site of the Al-Aqsa Mosque.

A golden vine adorned the gates of the Temple; it is described by both Josephus and the Mishnah. Its fame reached as far as Rome, where it was mentioned by the historian Tacitus.

=== Temenos expansion, date and duration ===
Reconstruction of the temple under Herod began with a massive expansion of the Temple Mount temenos. For example, the Temple Mount complex initially measured 7 hectares (17 acres) in size, but Herod expanded it to 14.4 hectares (36 acres) and so doubled its area. Herod's work on the Temple is generally dated from 20/19 BCE until 12/11 or 10 BCE. Writer Bieke Mahieu dates the work on the Temple enclosures from 25 BCE and that on the Temple building in 19 BCE, and situates the dedication of both in November 18 BCE.

=== Elements ===
==== Platform, substructures, retaining walls ====
Mt. Moriah had a plateau at the northern end, and steeply declined on the southern slope. It was Herod's plan that the entire mountain be turned into a giant square platform. The Temple Mount was originally intended to be 1,600 feet (490 m) wide by 900 feet (270 m) broad by 9 stories high, with walls up to 16 feet (4.9 m) thick, but had never been finished. To complete it, a trench was dug around the mountain, and huge stone blocks were laid. Some of these weighed well over 100 tons, the largest measuring 44.6 by 11 by 16.5 feet (13.6 m × 3.4 m × 5.0 m) and weighing approximately 567–628 tons.

==== Court of the Gentiles ====
The Court of the Gentiles was primarily a bazaar, with vendors selling souvenirs, sacrificial animals, food. Currency was also exchanged, with Roman currency exchanged for Tyrian money, as also mentioned in the New Testament account of Jesus and the Money Changers, when Jerusalem was packed with Jewish pilgrims who had come for Passover, perhaps numbering 300,000 to 400,000.

Above the Huldah Gates, on top the Temple walls, was the Royal Stoa, a large basilica praised by Josephus as "more worthy of mention than any other [structure] under the sun"; its main part was a lengthy Hall of Columns which includes 162 columns, structured in four rows.

The Royal Stoa is widely accepted to be part of Herod's work; however, recent archaeological finds in the Western Wall tunnels suggest that it was built in the first century during the reign of Agripas, as opposed to the 1st century BCE.

==== Pinnacle ====
The accounts of the temptation of Christ in the gospels of Matthew and Luke both suggest that the Second Temple had one or more 'pinnacles':

Then he [Satan] brought Him to Jerusalem, set Him on the pinnacle of the temple, and said to Him, "If You are the Son of God, throw Yourself down from here."

The Greek word used is πτερύγιον (pterugion), which literally means a tower, rampart, or pinnacle. According to Strong's Concordance, it can mean little wing, or by extension anything like a wing such as a battlement or parapet. The archaeologist Benjamin Mazar thought it referred to the southeast corner of the Temple overlooking the Kidron Valley.

==== Inner courts ====
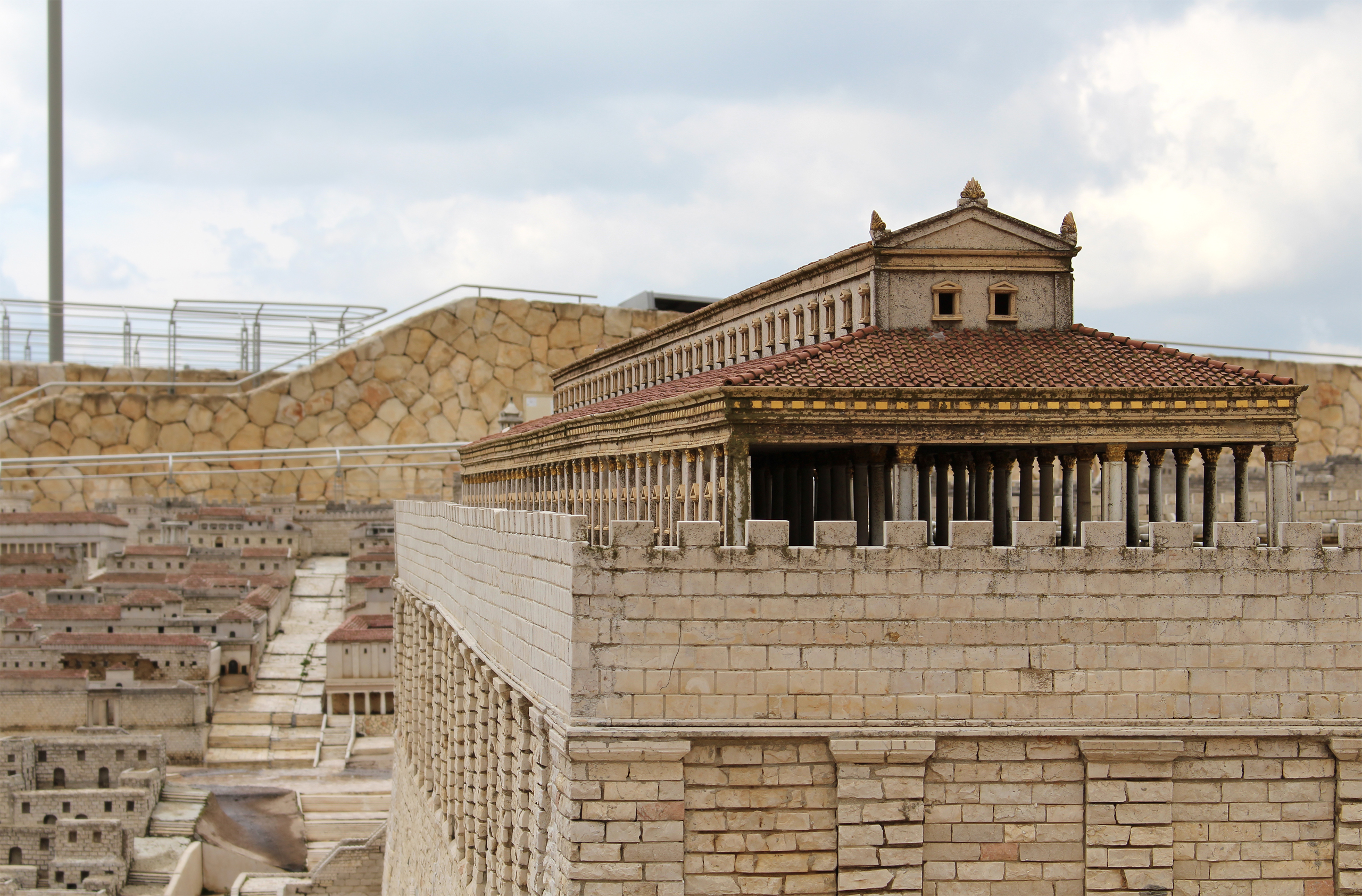
The Royal Stoa in the Holyland Model of Jerusalem

According to Josephus, there were ten entrances into the inner courts, four on the south, four on the north, one on the east and one leading east to west from the Court of Women to the court of the Israelites, named the Nicanor Gate. According to Josephus, Herod the Great erected a golden eagle over the great gate of the Temple.

==== Roofs ====
Joachim Bouflet states that "the teams of archaeologists Nahman Avigad in 1969–1980 in the Herodian city of Jerusalem, and Yigael Shiloh in 1978–1982, in the city of David" have proven that the roofs of the Second Temple had no dome. In this, they support Josephus' description of the Second Temple.

== Pilgrimages and religious services ==
=== Pilgrimages ===
At the time of the three pilgrimage festivals, Jerusalem became a gathering place for tens of thousands of pilgrims from across Judea, Galilee, Transjordan, and the Diaspora, who stayed anywhere from a few days to several weeks. Jews from distant parts of the Roman Empire would arrive by boat at the port of Jaffa, where they would join a caravan for the three-day journey to the Holy City and secure lodgings in one of the many hotels or hostelries. Thereafter, they would exchange some of their money from the standard Greek and Roman currency to Jewish and Tyrian money, the latter two considered acceptable for religious use. Mishnah Bikkurim 3:3–4 provides a detailed account of how pilgrims were welcomed to Jerusalem during the festival of Shavuot:

Those who lived near [Jerusalem] would bring fresh figs and grapes, while those who lived far away would bring dried figs and raisins. An ox would go in front of them, his horns bedecked with gold and with an olive-crown on its head. The flute would play before them [...] When they drew close to Jerusalem they would send messengers in advance, and they would adorn their bikkurim. The governors and chiefs and treasurers would go out to greet them, and according to the rank of the entrants they would go forth. All the skilled artisans of Jerusalem would stand up before them and greet them saying, "Our brothers, men of such and such a place, we welcome you in peace." [...] When they reached the Temple Mount even King Agrippas would take the basket and place it on his shoulder [...] When he got to the Temple Court, the Levites would sing the song: "I will extol You, O Lord, for You have raised me up, and You have not let my enemies rejoice over me" (Psalms 30:2).

This passage reflects the public and ceremonial nature of the pilgrimage, as well as the communal ethos fostered by shared ritual, music, and mutual recognition. The idea that pilgrimage helped promote social cohesion is also expressed by Josephus, who writes:

Let them come together three times a year from the ends of the land that the Hebrews conquer, into the city in which they establish the Temple, in order that they may give thanks to God for the benefits that they have received and that they may appeal for benefits for the nature and coming together and taking a common meal, may they be dear to each other. For it is well that they not be ignorant of one another, being compatriots and sharing in the same practices. This will occur for them through such intermingling, instilling a memory of them through sight and association, for if they remain unmixed with one another they will be thought completely strangers to each other.

The Jerusalem Temple held central importance not only for Jews in Judaea, but also for Jewish communities in the Diaspora. The celebrations brought a variety of languages and dialects spoken by Jews to the streets of the city. Philo, a Jewish philosopher from Alexandria, writes:

Countless multitudes from countless cities come, some over land, others by sea, from east and west and north and south at every feast. They take the temple for their port as a general haven and safe refuge from the bustle and great turmoil of life, and there they seek to find calm weather, and, released from the cares whose yoke has been heavy upon them from their earliest years, to enjoy a brief breathing space in scenes of genial cheerfulness.

The importance of the Temple for the Diaspora is further illustrated by the delegation led by Philo and other Alexandrian Jews to Emperor Caligula, during which they appealed against the proposed installation of the emperor’s statue in the Temple.

There is evidence that the pilgrimage to the Second Temple continued to impress non-Jewish authors centuries after its destruction. Menander Rhetor, a late 3rd-century orator from Laodicea, writes that while many festivals gather crowds, the greatest gatherings are found elsewhere: "the largest multitudes are to be found at the festival of the Hebrews living in Syria Palaestina, as they are gathered in very large numbers from most nations."

=== Pilgrimage festivals ===
==== Passover ====
On the 14th of Nisan, the eve of Passover, participants would bring a lamb or kid to the Temple for sacrifice. The slaughtering took place in the Temple courtyards, typically in the afternoon—between the ninth and eleventh hours (roughly 3–5 PM)—according to Josephus, who also notes that groups of 10 to 20 people shared each animal. Overall, it is estimated that several thousand sheep were sacrificed during Passover. The Mishnah records that the sacrifices were performed in three organized batches, with priests assisting by collecting and pouring the blood at the base of the altar. Once slaughtered, the animals were roasted—in clay ovens, according to the Mishnah—and eaten later that night, along with unleavened bread (matzah) and bitter herbs (maror), in accordance with Exodus 12. Participants also recited the Hallel during the meal.

==== Shavuot ====
Shavuot was observed on the fiftieth day following the waving of the 'omer (barley offering). Celebrated in the month of Sivan, it marked the beginning of the wheat harvest and served as the conclusion of the Passover season, earning it the alternative name 'Atseret ("conclusion") in some sources. The central Temple ritual in Shavuot was the offering of the "two loaves" of wheat bread, along with prescribed animal sacrifices, as outlined in the Torah. According to rabbinic tradition, while new grain (ḥadash) was permitted for general use after the omer offering, wheat for meal offerings in the Temple was permitted only from Shavuot onward. Shavuot also functioned as the festival of first fruits (bikkurim), during which pilgrims brought offerings from the seven species to the Temple priesthood. According to the Mishnah, these bikkurim could be brought from Shavuot until Sukkot.

==== Sukkot ====
The pilgrimage festival of Sukkot, which began on the 15th of Tishrei and lasted seven days, was regarded as the preeminent Jewish festival during the Second Temple period. Its centrality is evident in the ancient sources, some referring to it simply as "the Festival". Temple offerings during Sukkot involved a extraoridnarily high number of animals sacrificed daily as required by the Torah. Central to the celebration was the procession with the 'Four Species' (which derives from Leviticus 23)—a palm branch (lulav), myrtle (hadas), willow (aravah), and citron (etrog)—which were carried, and according to the Mishnah, shaken, during the recitation of Psalm 118. Another key ritual was the willow ceremony, in which large willow branches were placed around the altar. Participants would circle the altar once each day and seven times on the seventh day, reciting Psalm 118 and concluding with the beating of branches. According to the Mishnah, the willow ceremony overrode the Shabbat, though the Boethusians objecting to this ruling. The water libation ritual, symbolizing the onset of the rainy season, involved water drawn from the Pool of Siloam and poured by the priest at the altar each day. Each night, this ritual was preceded by the Simchat Beit HaShoevah, a night-long celebration held in the Temple courtyards, characterized by music, dancing, and the lighting of bonfires. The Levites stood on the steps leading to the Nicanor Gate, chanting the "Songs of Ascent" from the Book of Psalms.

=== Yom Kippur ===
Yom Kippur, the Day of Atonement commanded in the Torah and observed on the tenth of Tishrei, was marked by a special Temple service performed by the high priest, as described in Leviticus 16 and later elaborated in Mishnah Yoma. The high priest prepared for a week prior to the festival through isolation, purification, and instruction. On the day itself, he put on white linen garments after the morning tamid sacrifice, offered a bull and a goat as sin offerings, and entered the Holy of Holies multiple times to sprinkle blood on the Mercy seat and pronounce the Divine Name. He also carried out the scapegoat ritual, confessing Israel's sins over a second goat and sending it into the wilderness. After further immersions and changes of garments, the high priest concluded the day with additional sacrifices and the evening tamid.

== Archaeology ==
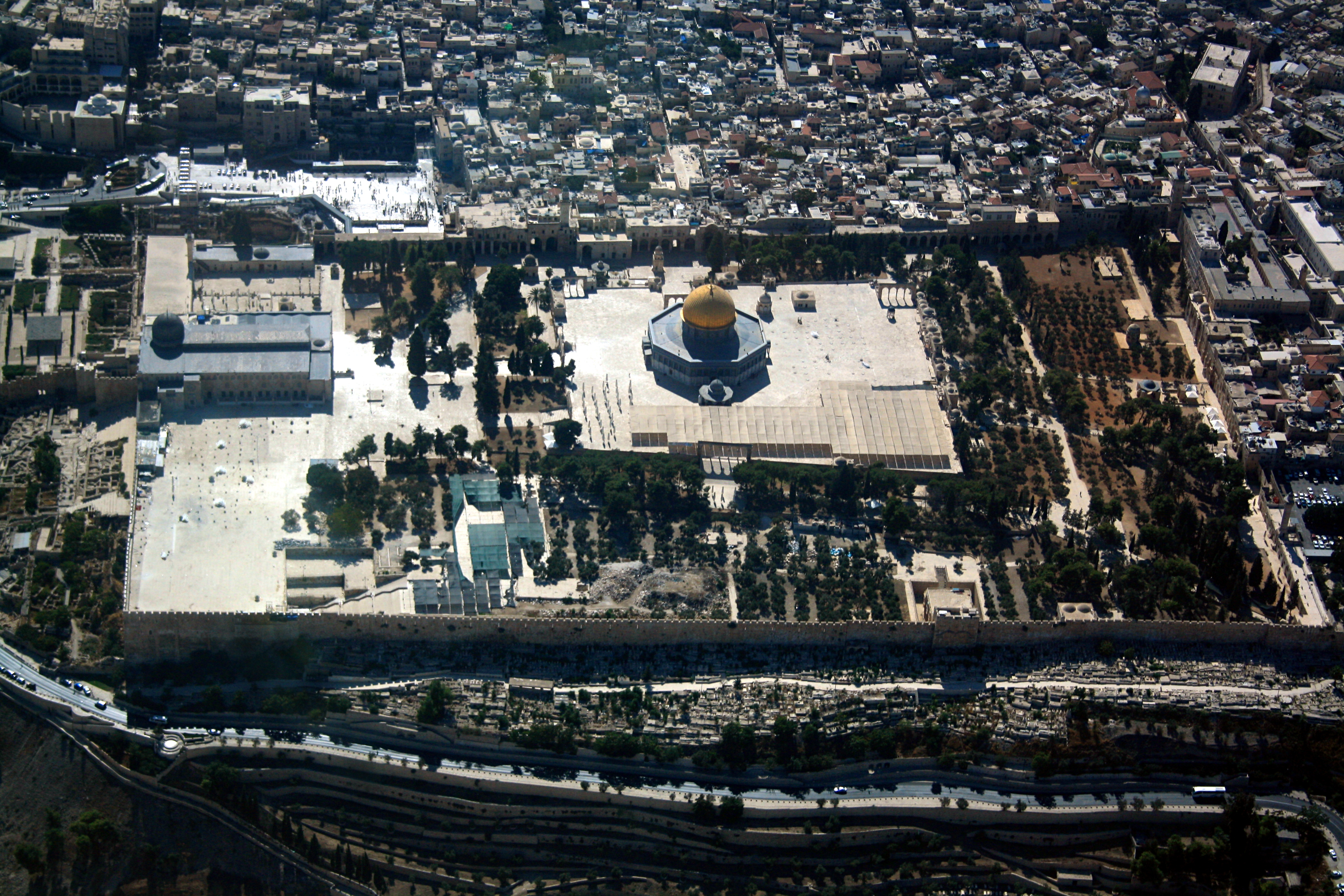
View of the Temple Mount in 2013; east at the bottom

Archaeological understanding of the Second Temple is primarily derived from investigations of the outer walls of the Temple complex, as direct excavations on the Temple Mount itself have been limited due to the presence of later Islamic structures. Foundational research was conducted by Sir Charles Warren between 1867 and 1870; his work remains a principal source for the site's architectural layout.

=== Temple warning inscriptions ===
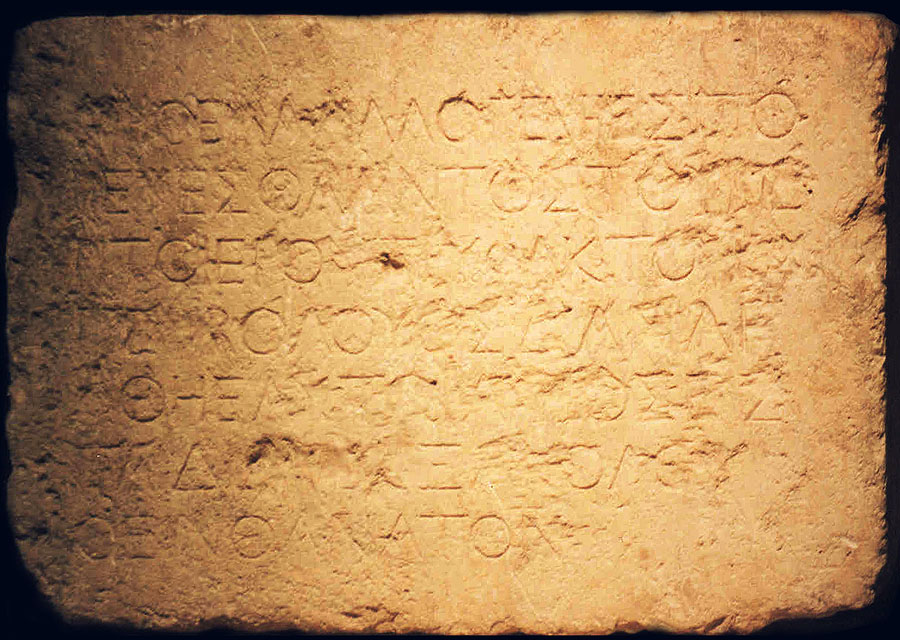
Soreg inscription warning non-Jews from entering the sanctuary of the Second Temple

In 1871, a hewn stone measuring 60 cm × 90 cm (24 in × 35 in) and engraved with Greek uncials was discovered near a court on the Temple Mount in Jerusalem and identified by Charles Simon Clermont-Ganneau as being the Temple Warning inscription. The stone inscription outlined the prohibition extended to those who were not of the Jewish nation to proceed beyond the soreg separating the larger Court of the Gentiles and the inner courts. The inscription read in seven lines:

ΜΗΟΕΝΑΑΛΛΟΓΕΝΗΕΙΣΠΟ
ΡΕΥΕΣΟΑΙΕΝΤΟΣΤΟΥΠΕ
ΡΙΤΟΙΕΡΟΝΤΡΥΦΑΚΤΟΥΚΑΙ
ΠΕΡΙΒΟΛΟΥΟΣΔΑΝΛΗ
ΦΘΗΕΑΥΤΩΙΑΙΤΙΟΣΕΣ
ΤΑΙΔΙΑΤΟΕΞΑΚΟΛΟΥ
ΘΕΙΝΘΑΝΑΤΟΝ
Translation: "Let no foreigner enter within the parapet and the partition which surrounds the Temple precincts. Anyone caught [violating] will be held accountable for his ensuing death."

Today, the stone is preserved in Istanbul's Museum of Antiquities.

In 1935 a fragment of another similar Temple warning inscription was found.

The word "foreigner" has an ambiguous meaning. Some scholars believe it referred to all gentiles, regardless of ritual purity status or religion. Others argue that it referred to unconverted Gentiles since Herod wrote the inscription. Herod himself was a converted Idumean (or Edomite) and was unlikely to exclude himself or his descendants.

=== Place of trumpeting ===
Another ancient inscription, partially preserved on a stone discovered below the southwest corner of the Herodian Mount, contains the words "to the place of trumpeting". The stone's shape suggests that it was part of a parapet, and it has been interpreted as belonging to a spot on the Mount described by Josephus, "where one of the priests to stand and to give notice, by sound of trumpet, in the afternoon of the approach, and on the following evening of the close, of every seventh day" closely resembling what the Talmud says.

=== Walls and gates of the Temple complex ===
After 1967, archaeologists found that the wall extended all the way around the Temple Mount and is part of the city wall near the Lions' Gate. Thus, the remaining part of the Temple Mount is not only the Western Wall. Currently, Robinson's Arch (named after American Edward Robinson) remains as the beginning of an arch that spanned the gap between the top of the platform and the higher ground farther away. Visitors and pilgrims also entered through the still-extant, but now plugged, gates on the southern side that led through colonnades to the top of the platform. The Southern wall was designed as a grand entrance. Recent archaeological digs have found numerous mikvehs (ritual baths) for the ritual purification of the worshipers, and a grand stairway leading to one of the now blocked entrances.

=== Underground structures ===
Inside the walls, the platform was supported by a series of vaulted archways, now called Solomon's Stables, which still exist. Their current renovation by the Waqf is extremely controversial.

=== Quarry ===
On September 25, 2007, Yuval Baruch, archaeologist with the Israeli Antiquities Authority announced the discovery of a quarry compound that may have provided King Herod with the stones to build his Temple on the Temple Mount. Coins, pottery and an iron stake found proved the date of the quarrying to be about 19 BCE. Archaeologist Ehud Netzer confirmed that the large outlines of the stone cuts is evidence that it was a massive public project worked by hundreds of slaves.

=== Floor tiling from courts ===
More recent findings from the Temple Mount Sifting Project include floor tiling from the Second Temple period.

=== Magdala stone interpretation ===
The Magdala stone is thought to be a representation of the Second Temple carved before its destruction in the year 70.

== Destruction of the Temple ==
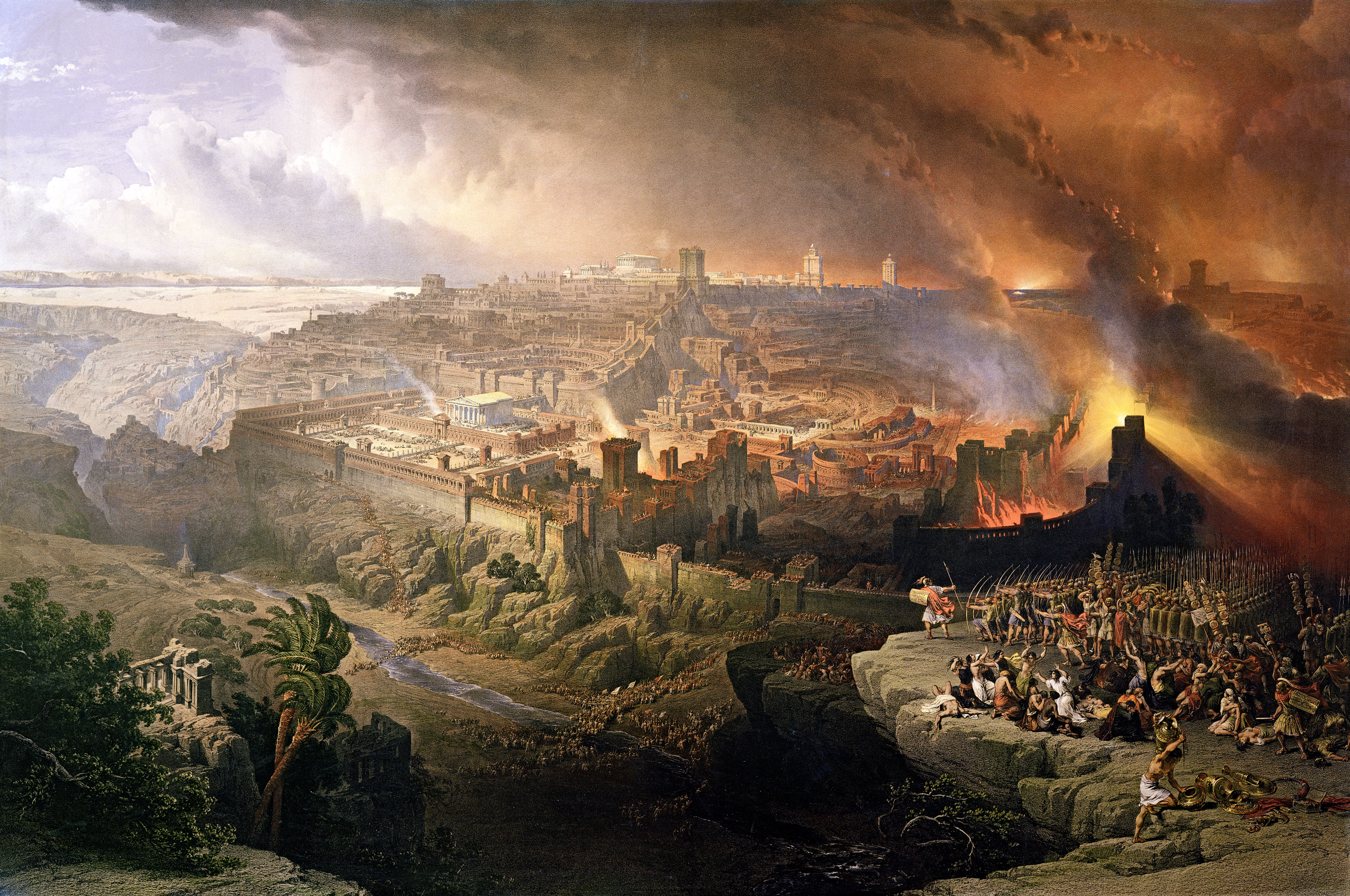
Siege and Destruction of Jerusalem by the Romans (1850 painting by David Roberts). Looking southwest

In 66 CE, the Jewish population of Judaea launched a rebellion against the Roman Empire. Four years later, on the Hebrew calendrical date of Tisha B'Av, either 4 August 70 or 30 August 70, Roman legions under Titus retook and destroyed much of Jerusalem and Herod's Temple. Josephus, while an apologist for the Empire, claims the burning of the Temple was the impulsive act of a Roman soldier, despite Titus's orders to preserve it, whereas later Christian sources, traced to Tacitus, suggest that Titus himself authorized the destruction, a view currently favored by modern scholars, though the debate persists.

Historical accounts relate that not only the Jewish Temple was destroyed, but also the entire Lower city of Jerusalem. Even so, according to Josephus, Titus did not totally raze the towers (such as the Tower of Phasael, now erroneously called the Tower of David), keeping them as a memorial of the city's strength. The Midrash Rabba (Eikha Rabba 1:32) states that Rabban Yohanan ben Zakkai asked Emperor Vespasian to spare the westernmost gates of the city (Hebrew: פילי מערבאה), which lead to Lydda (Lod). According to the midrash, when the city was eventually taken, the Arab auxiliaries who fought alongside the Romans under their general, Fanjar, spared that westernmost wall from destruction.

The Arch of Titus, which was built in Rome to commemorate Titus's victory in Judea, depicts a Roman triumph, with soldiers carrying spoils from the Temple, including the temple menorah. According to an inscription on the Colosseum, Emperor Vespasian built the Colosseum with war spoils in 79–possibly from the spoils of the Second Temple. The sects of Judaism that had their base in the Temple dwindled in importance, including the priesthood and the Sadducees.

The golden vessels from the Temple were publicly displayed in the Temple of Peace, a monumental complex completed by Vespasian in 75 CE. This display formed part of a broader collection of imperial trophies and artworks. In contrast, the Torah scroll and the purple Temple curtains, were not exhibited but instead deposited and guarded in Vespasian's residence. Later traditions and historical sources trace the possible movement of these objects across the ancient world.

A Jewish tradition attributed to rabbi Eliezer ben Jose, dated to around 170 CE, claims he saw a golden diadem and the Temple curtain in Rome, possibly in the imperial treasury. In the 6th century, the Byzantine historian Procopius reported that the "treasures of the Jews" captured by Titus had been looted from Rome by the Vandal king Geiseric in 455 CE and taken to Carthage. These were later recovered by the Byzantine general Belisarius in 533 CE and paraded in a triumphal procession in Constantinople. Alarmed by a Jewish observer's warning that the objects belonged only in their original sacred location, Emperor Justinian ordered their transfer to Christian churches in Jerusalem. The ultimate fate of the Temple treasures remains uncertain. Some later medieval sources claim they remained in Rome, while others suggest they may have been lost during the Persian sack of Jerusalem in 614 CE, if they had remained in the city.

Although Jews continued to inhabit the destroyed city, Emperor Hadrian established a new Roman colonia called Aelia Capitolina. At the end of the Bar Kokhba revolt in 135 CE, many of the Jewish communities were massacred and Jews were then banned from entering Jerusalem. A Roman temple was set up on the former site of Herod's Temple for the practice of Roman religion.

== Legacy ==
The destruction of the Temple often serves as a backdrop for poetic expressions of the longing to return to and rebuild the Temple and Jerusalem. One such piyyut (Jewish liturgical poem), recited on Yom Kippur, is Avodah, a poetic depiction of the High Priest's ritual on that day.

The destruction of the First and Second Temples is commemorated on Tisha B'Av, a major Jewish fast day that has been called "the saddest day in the Jewish calendar". Leading up to this, a three-week period of mourning is observed, during which weddings and haircuts are forbidden, and many Jews abstain from eating meat during The Nine Days at the beginning of the month of Av.

Verses 5 and 6 of Psalm 137 and the words "If I forget thee O Jerusalem..." are customarily recited during a Jewish wedding ceremony shortly before breaking a glass as a symbolic act of mourning over the destruction of the Temple, even when at a time of greatest joy. In late medieval Europe, Jewish brides would often wear a large, decorative ring symbolizing the Temple, while grooms would place ashes on their heads to commemorate the destruction.

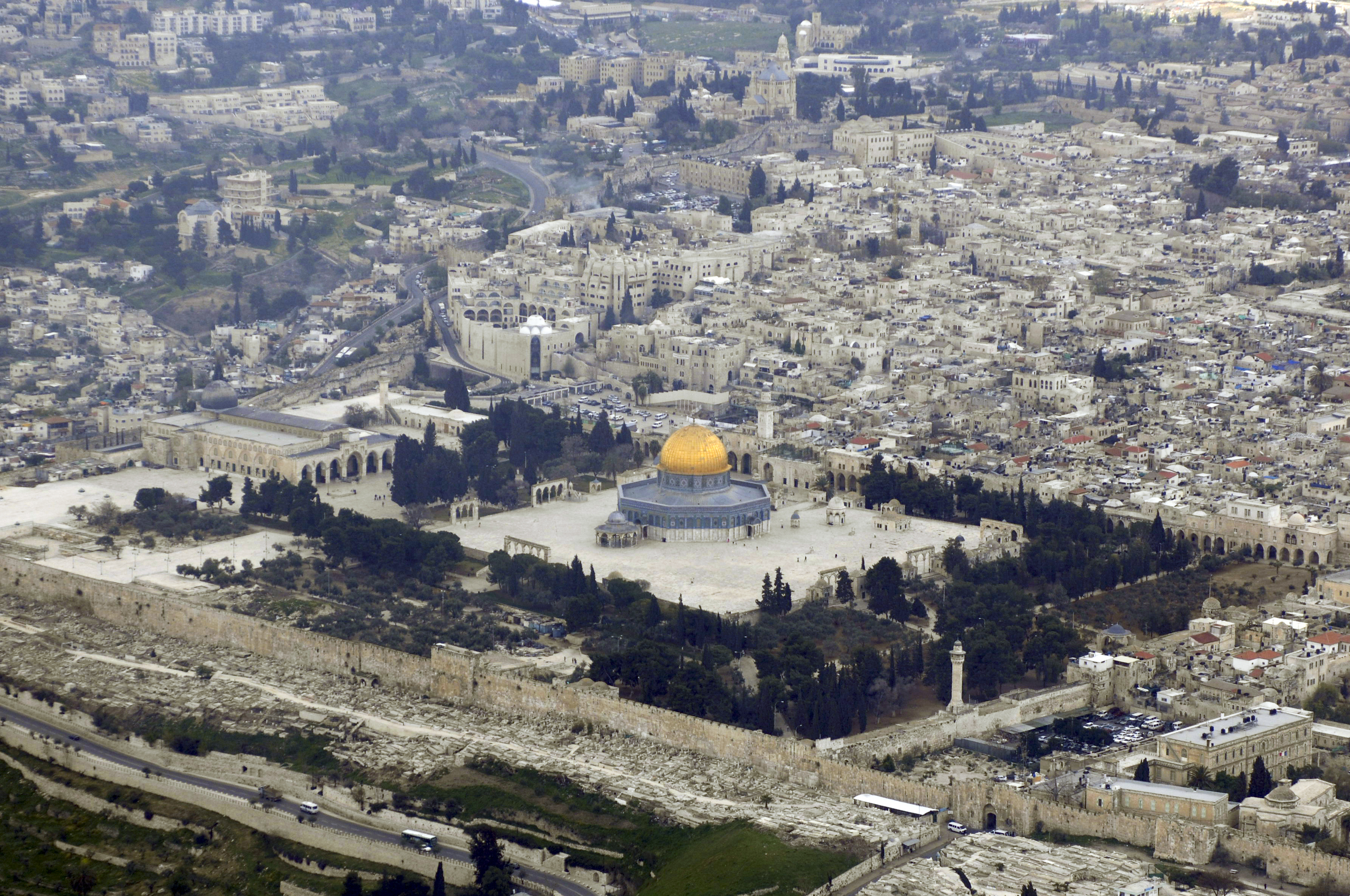
Present-day view of the Temple Mount looking southwest, with the golden Dome of the Rock visible center and the al-Aqsa Mosque to the left beyond some trees. Parts of the Old City of Jerusalem can be seen surrounding the Mount.

The hope for the rebuilding of Jerusalem and the Temple is a central theme in Jewish prayer, art, and life cycle events, consistently expressed through various cultural and religious practices.

A tradition dating back to the Talmud (Bava Batra 60b) requires that a patch of wall in a new home near the front door and measuring approximately 18 by 18 inches (46 by 46 cm) be left unfinished or unpainted as a perpetual reminder and a sign of mourning for the destruction of the Temple.

Jewish eschatology includes a belief that the Second Temple will be replaced by a future Third Temple in Jerusalem.

== See also ==
- Archaeological remnants of the Jerusalem Temple
- Herodian architecture
- Jerusalem during the Second Temple period
- Jerusalem stone
- List of artifacts significant to the Bible
- List of megalithic sites
- Replicas of the Jewish Temple
- Temple of Peace, Rome
- Temple in Jerusalem
- Timeline of Jewish history
- Jewish–Roman wars
