= Joshua dei Cantori =

Joshua dei Cantori was a converted Italian Jew who attacked the Talmud at Cremona in 1559. According to Moritz Steinschneider, he belonged to the family Cantarini. In consequence of a dispute with Joseph Ottolenghi, who was head of the Talmudical school of Cremona, Cantori, in order to avenge himself on his adversary, appeared with the converted Jew Baptista Vittorio Eliano and denounced the Talmud as containing blasphemies against the Christian faith. The result of this accusation was the public burning of 10,000 to 15,000 Hebrew books in 1559 at Cremona. Joseph ha-Kohen records this incident, and adds that later Cantori was found assassinated in a street of Cremona, and was buried "behind the board" in the Jewish cemetery of that city as a mark of contumely. According to another source quoted by J. Wolf, Cantori was a convert to Christianity.
