= Tosefot Hakhmei Anglia =

Tosefot Hakhmei Anglia (Hebrew: תוספות חכמי אנגליה, English: Glosses of the sages of England) is a Talmud commentary composed by one of the Tosafists living in England.

== Manuscript ==
The manuscript is found in the Biblioteca Palatina, Parma, Italy. The catalog editor (de Rossi) categorized the manuscript as a copy of Sefer Mitzvot Katan by Isaac of Corbeil. As a result, the manuscript was ignored for many years. In the 1970s, the manuscript was rediscovered and printed (by Machon Yerushalayim).

The manuscript contains novellae to the Talmudic tractates Berachot, Megillah, Beitzah, Pesachim, Avodah Zarah, Gittin, Sanhedrin, Niddah, Bava Metzia, and Kiddushin. It also contains a reference to the author's novellae on Ketubot, indicating that the author also produced novellae on additional tractates.

== The author ==
The author's identity is unknown. He mentions ideas in the name of his father, his brother-in-law R' Aharon, and his friends R' Avraham, R' Yitzhak, and R' Yisrael. Beyond this, no biographical details are known about him.

== Tosafists mentioned in the work ==
As with all Tosafist compositions, the author collected interpretations from other Tosafists and other commentators, including R' Shemaiah, RIBaN, Rabbeinu Tam, Rashbam, Ri HaZaken, Shitah Évreux, and his father and brother-and-law.

English Tosafists mentioned in the work are: R Moshe ben Yom Tov of London (author of the work "Tosefet Alfasi" on the Rif), and his sons R' Eliyahu of London and R' Berechiah de Nicole, R' Meir ben Eliyahu de Nicole, R' Yosef de Nicole, R' Meir of London, and more.

The author also quotes from Kovetz Leviah, an anonymous Tosafist collection. That work mentions English Tosafists, though it is not known whether its author was English.

== About the work ==
The work, like other commentaries of the Rishonim, deals primarily with the simple meaning of the Talmudic sugyot. The author focuses on Rashi and analyzes the latter's concise language. The work includes many halachic rulings. Among them, in the chapter Keitzad Mevarchim in Berachot it mentions rulings regarding the blessings before food.

Like all Tosafist works, this work copies from other Tosafists, and has many parallels to other Tosafist works. At the same time, it is often worded differently from other works, which occasionally affects the meaning.
