= Middot (Talmud) =

Tractate of the Mishnah and Talmud

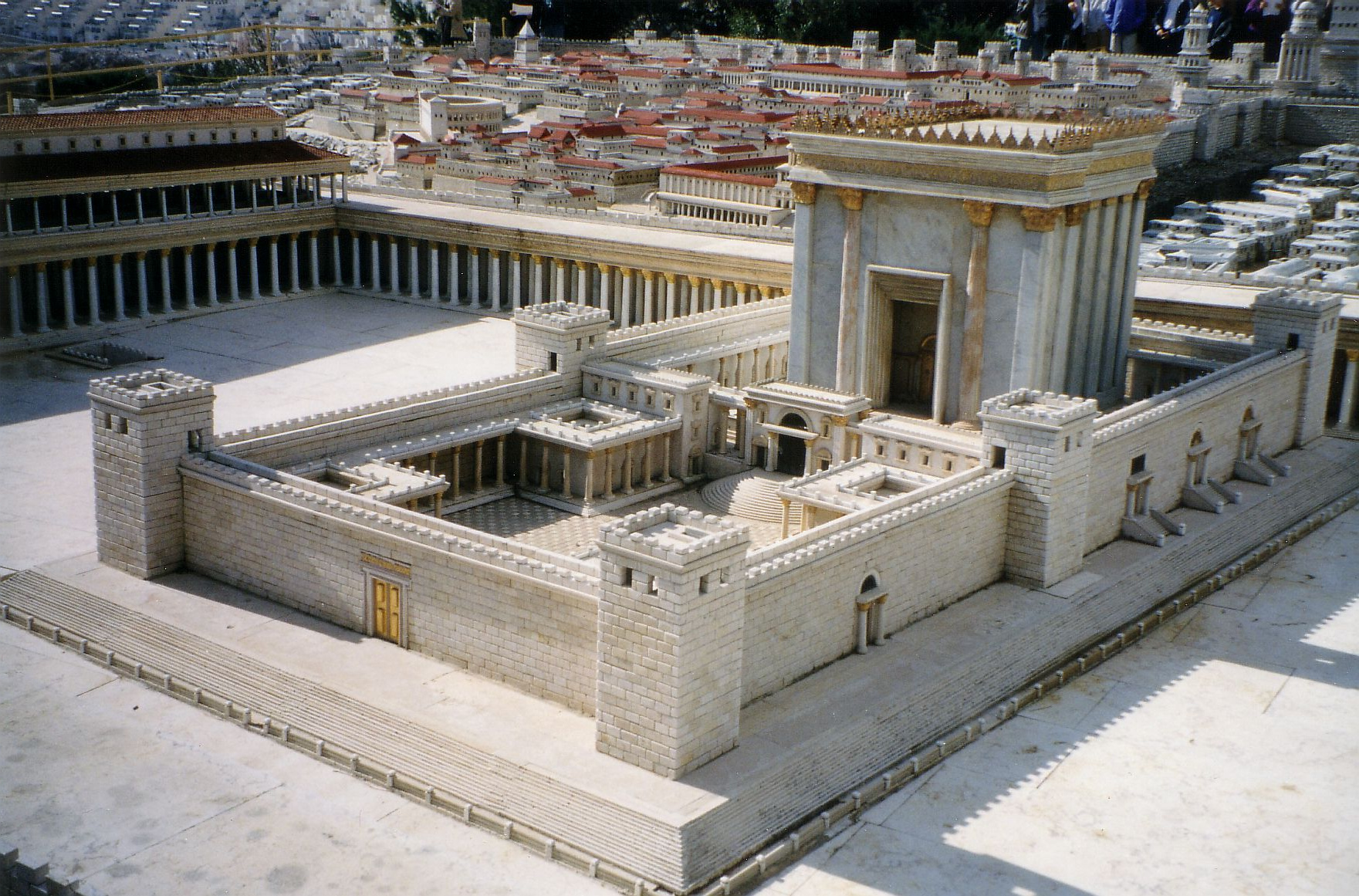
Model of the Second Temple showing the courtyards and the Sanctuary, as described in Middot.

Tractate Middot (Hebrew: מִדּוֹת, lit. "Measurements") is the tenth tractate of Seder Kodashim ("Order of Holies") of the Mishnah and of the Talmud. This tractate describes the dimensions and the arrangement of the Temple Mount in Jerusalem, and the Second Temple buildings and courtyards, various gates, the altar of sacrifice and its surroundings, and the places where the Priests and Levites kept watch in the Temple.

The tractate is divided into five chapters and has no Gemara either in the Jerusalem Talmud or the Babylonian Talmud, nor a Tosefta.

== Subject matter ==
This tractate describes the details and measurements of a hill in the city of Jerusalem known as the Temple Mount (Har Ha'bayit), and the Second Temple buildings, courtyards, gates and elements of the site as well as the places where the Kohanim (priests) and Levites kept watch in the Temple.

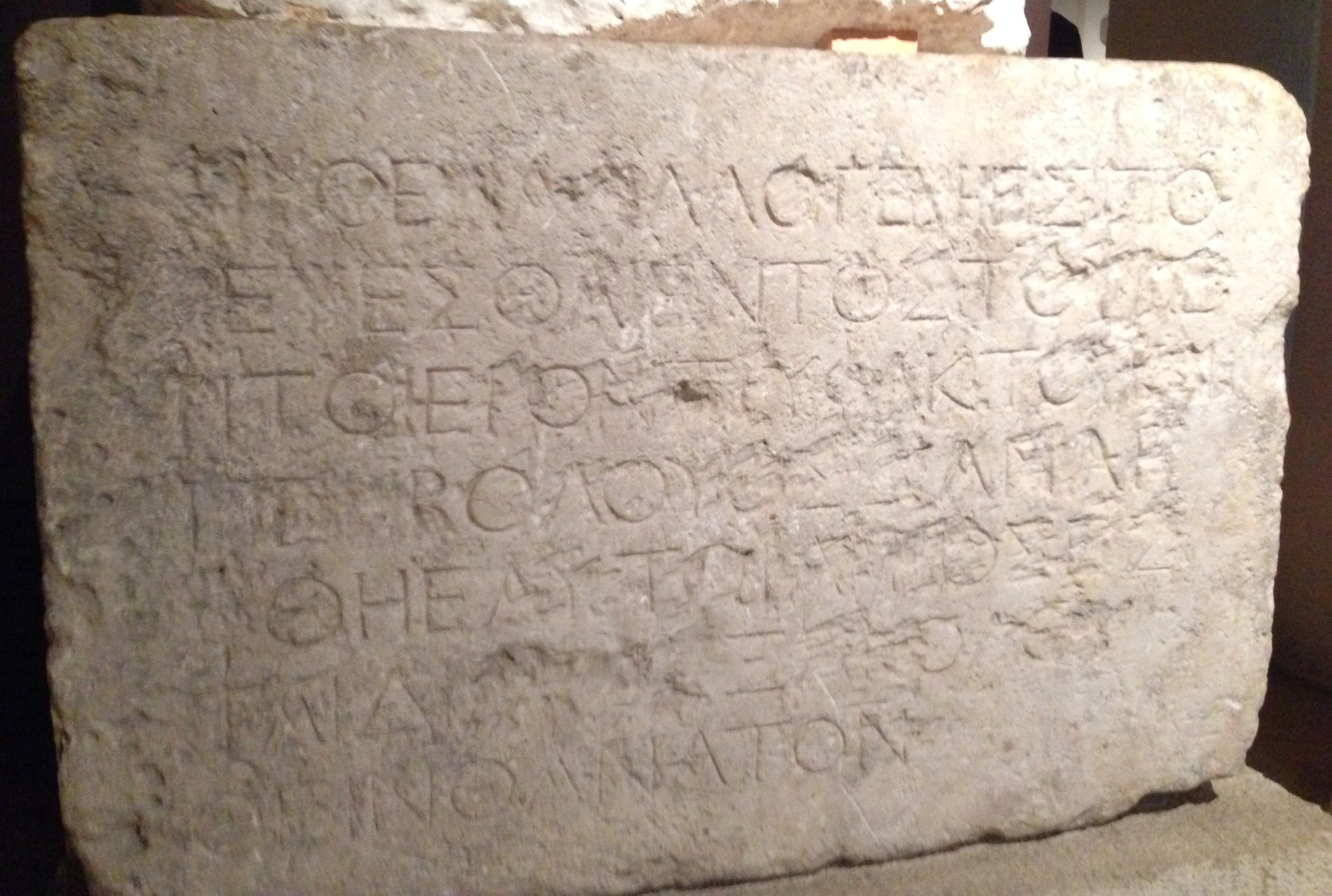
A stone warning inscription found on the Temple Mount accords with the description in Middot of the purpose of the fence (soreg) on the Mount.

The tractate gives the measurements of the Temple Mount and its various divisions. It states that the Temple Courtyard on the mount measured 135 cubits (amot) from north to south and 187 cubits from east to west and was surrounded by walls. Towards the front of the Temple Courtyard on the mount, and surrounding the Temple building, known as the Sanctuary (Azarah), was a low fence (soreg) designating the area beyond which a non-Jew, or a Jew who was ritually impure because of contact with a corpse (tumat met), could not proceed.

The main entrance to the Temple Courtyard was in the east and the Temple Sanctuary (Azarah) stood in the Temple Courtyard. There was a large open area between the eastern gate of the Courtyard and the Sanctuary. The Sanctuary area was divided into three areas, the first upon entering the Courtyard, was the Ezrat Nashim, the Women's Court, separated from the Ezrat Yisrael, the Israelite's Court by fifteen steps and "Nicanor's Gate", then the section containing the outer Altar (Middot 5:1) and finally, the Temple building itself.

The tractate describes how the Temple was divided into three halls: the Ulam (Antechamber), the Kodesh or Heichal (Inner Sanctuary); and the Kodesh Hakedoshim, the Holy of Holies. The Kohen Gadol (high priest) entered the Holy of Holies only once a year on the holiest day of the Jewish year, Yom Kippur. During the First Temple era, the Ark of the Covenant containing the tablets of the Ten Commandments and the Torah scroll written by Moses is said to have stood in the Holy of Holies. During the Second Temple era, the Holy of Holies was empty except for the large stone called the Foundation Stone (Evven Hashtiya) on which the Ark had been placed.

The golden Altar, the Menorah, and the Shulchan (Table of the Showbread) stood in the Heichal. This was where the kohanim conducted the daily service related to these holy utensils, such as burning the daily incense offering, lighting the Menorah, and the weekly replacement of the bread.

== Structure ==
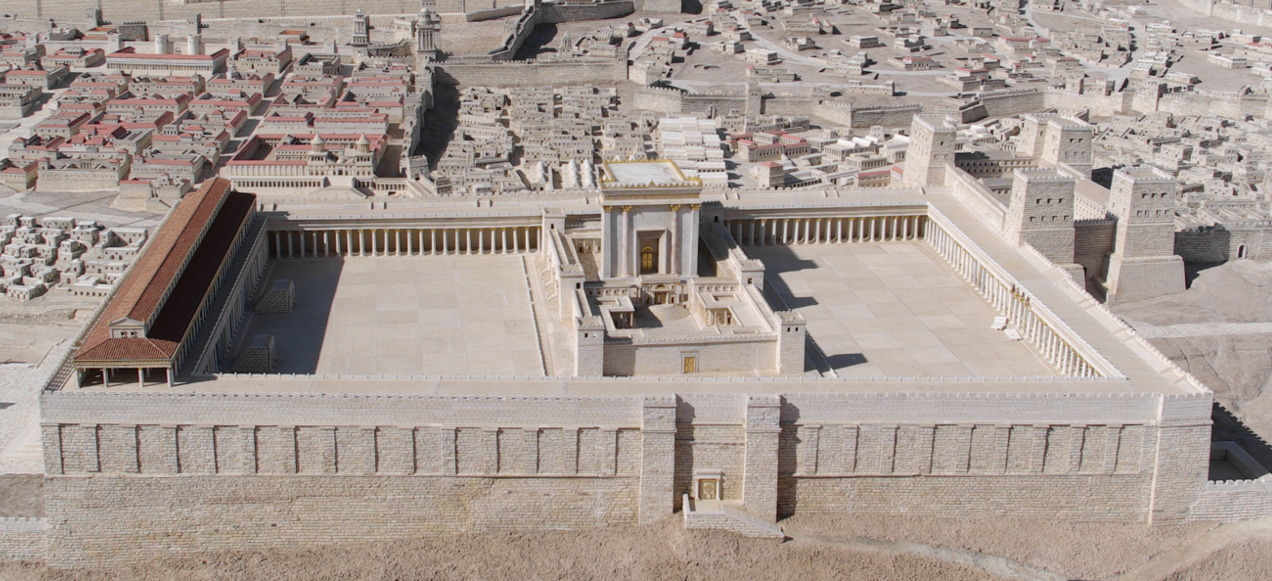
Model of the Temple Mount and the Second Temple, late 1st century BCE or early 1st century CE, reflecting descriptions in tractate Middot.

The tractate consists of five chapters and thirty-four sections (mishnayot). It has no Gemara – rabbinical analysis and commentary on the Mishnah – in either the Jerusalem Talmud or Babylonian Talmud. There is also no Tosefta for this tractate.

An overview of the topics of the chapters is as follows:

Chapter 1 lists the places where the Priests and Levites kept watch in the Temple at night and describes the gates of the Temple Mount and the inner courts of the Temple building, and in particular, the chamber where the priests slept at night and a chamber in which the Hasmoneans preserved altar-stones from an earlier time:

The first part of the chapter describes how priests kept guard in three places and the Levites in twenty-one, how these watches were controlled by the Captain of the Temple (Ish Har Ha-bayit), and the punishments meted out for falling asleep at the watch. The "place of the hearth" (bet ha-moḳed), a large hall with an arched ceiling is also described, where at night the older priests rested on stone benches around the walls and younger priests slept on the floor.

The guarding of the Temple is similarly described in tractate Tamid and follows a commandment in the Torah to guard the Temple (Num. 18:1–5, Num. 1:53, Num. 3:38). According to several commentators (Rambam; Rash; Bartenura), this was not for protection as the gates were locked at night, but to enhance the splendor of the building, just as royal palaces are watched by a ceremonial guard. According to other commentators, the Temple was guarded by day as well for this reason (Hamefaresh, Ravad and Rosh).

There is also a description in this chapter of the gates to the Temple Mount; of note is the description of a representation of Susa, the capital of the ancient Persian Empire over the eastern gate of the Temple Mount, and symbolic of Persian dominance over the Land of Israel at the time of the building of the Second Temple (circa 516 BCE).

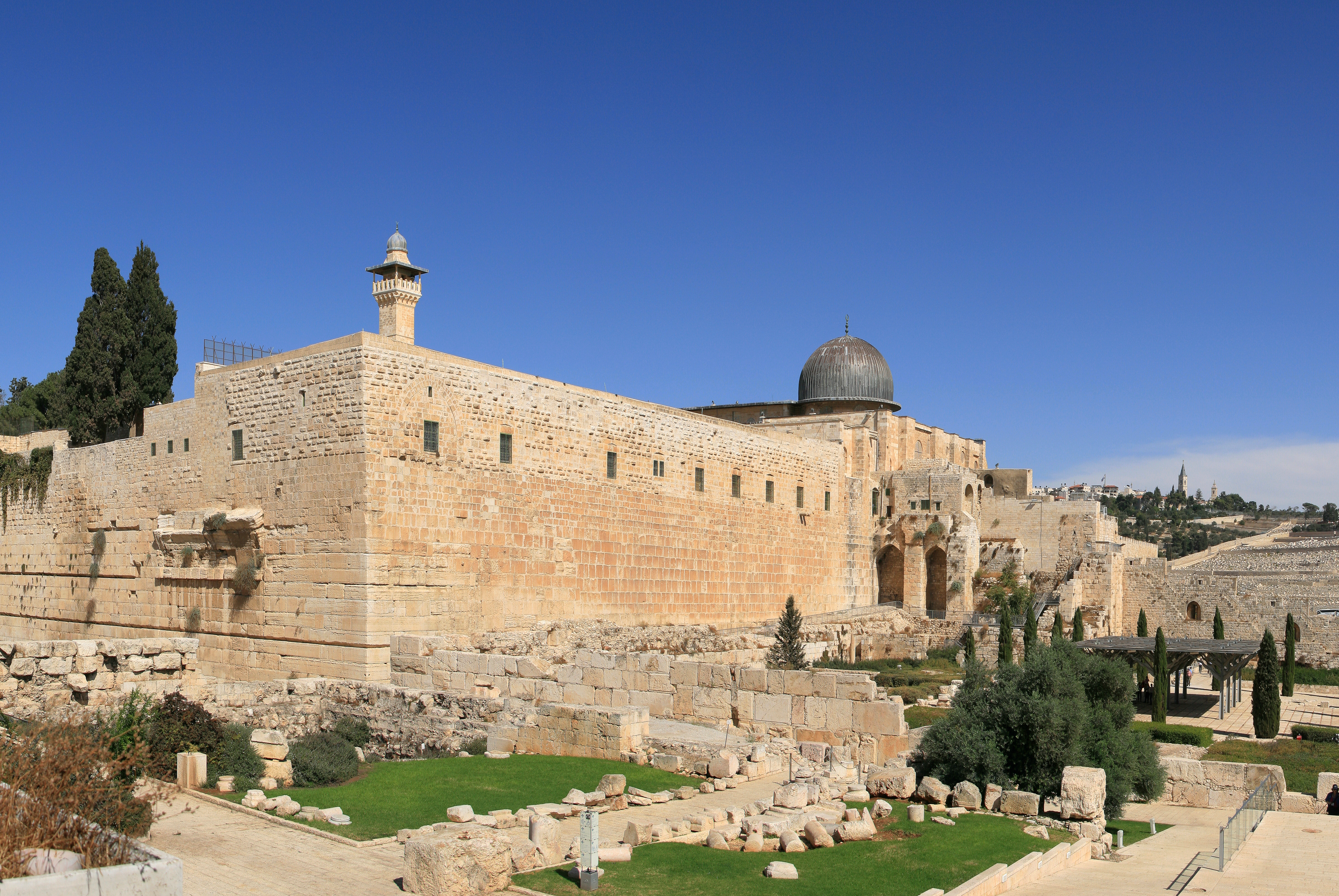
The retaining wall of the Temple Mount, described in this tractate, is still visible today, including the Western Wall; the southwest corner with the remains of Robinson's Arch shown here.

Chapter 2 provides the measurements of the Temple Mount and the buildings of the Sanctuary, including the courtyards, the chambers surrounding the courtyards that served various ritual and administrative purposes and the thirteen gates of the courtyard:

The Mishna states that the Temple Mount covered an area of 500 square cubits (amot) surrounded by a massive wall; this is in accordance with the description in the Book of Ezekiel (Ezek. 42:20). The height and breadth of the steps and of the gates to the Temple are also given and all the doors except for those of the "gate of Nicanor" are described as covered with gold.

The tractate gives the measurements of the Women's Court and the Israelites' Court inside the Sanctuary and describes the how these two courtyards were connected by a flight of fifteen steps, allegorically corresponding to the fifteen "Songs of Ascent" in Psalms (Ps. 120 – 134 ); a choir of kohanim stood on these steps while the Levites played instruments to provide musical accompaniment to their singing. The Mishna then describes the structures surrounding the courtyards, including room in which the Levites kept their musical instruments.

Chapter 3 describes the altar for offerings of burnt sacrifices that stood in front of the Sanctuary and its surrounding area; the place on the north side of the altar for killing the sacrificial animals, the laver between the porch and the altar, and the golden grape-vine decorating the porch.

The Mishna specifies that the stones of the altar had to be in their natural form and could not be shaped with an iron tool or changed in any way. The reason given (Middot 3:4) is that iron is used to make weapons which shorten human life, while the altar serves to prolong life by making amends for sin; it is therefore not appropriate to use this cause of harm in building the altar.

Chapter 4 describes the Inner Sanctuary (Heichal) and the chambers surrounding it, along with its doors, chambers, steps.

Chapter 5 provides further information regarding the Sanctuary and its chambers. It describes a hall built of square stones called Lishkat ha-Gazit, where the Great Sanhedrin met to determine matters concerning the priesthood.

== Historical context ==
Tractate Middot provides a description of the Temple as reconstructed by Herod in the late 1st century BCE and is based on the memory of sages who saw the Temple and gave an oral description of it to their disciples, after its destruction in 70 CE during the First Jewish–Roman War. One of the main sages reporting the details of the Temple in this tractate is Rabbi Eliezer ben Jacob, a Tanna who lived during the 1st century CE. He is thought to have seen the Temple while it was still standing, and he may also have learned about its inner arrangements from his uncle who served in it. The final redaction of the tractate by Rabbi Judah ha-Nasi (135 – 217 CE) contains various traditions of other authorities and which are also cited in the Babylonian Talmud tractate Yoma (16a-17a) and the Jerusalem Talmud Yoma (2: 3, 39).

Middot, like tractate Tamid, differs from most of the other tractates of the Mishna in that it is primarily a descriptive, rather than a halachic (legal) text. Maimonides, in his introduction to this tractate, notes that the purpose of this tractate was to elucidate details for the rebuilding of the temple, even though according to Jewish tradition, the design of the Third Temple would be based on the vision of the prophet Ezekiel (Ezek. 40 – 43) and differ in some regards from that of the Second Temple; nonetheless, a description of the Second Temple is helpful, as the Third Temple will largely correspond to it and serve as a guide for the rebuilding of the Temple when the opportunity should arise. Thus, occasionally, the rabbis use Ezekiel's visions of the Temple in their own description, even though they were aware that the actual Temple did not look exactly as Ezekiel described it and on other occasions they even use descriptions of Solomon's Temple, assuming that the First Temple served as guideline for the building of the Second Temple.

The Roman-Jewish historian, Josephus, also provides detailed descriptions of the Temple in his work "The Jewish War" and his account generally accords with the description in this tractate although with some differences in detail. Both the rabbis and Josephus agree that it was a remarkable building but the purpose of the rabbis’ description was to provide information so that subsequent generations could rebuild it, and Josephus was writing to impress his non-Jewish audiences.

== In popular culture ==
The Tractate Middot (referred to as the "Tractate Middoth") is a prominent plot element in the short story "The Tractate Middoth" by M. R. James.
