= Shemaiah of Soissons =

12th-century French Jewish scholar

Shemaiah of Soissons was a French Jewish scholar of the 12th century. He is often erroneously identified with Shemaiah of Troyes.

He was a pupil of Rashi, and Abraham Epstein identified him as Rashi's "secretary" and "scribe". Rashi referred to him as "our brother Shemaiah", and wrote that due to their shared study of Ezekiel, Rashi changed one of his interpretations.

== Works ==
With Rashi's oversight, Shemaiah composed a commentary to several tractates of the Talmud; Shemaiah's commentary to Middot is printed in standard editions of the Talmud. Many of his other compositions did not survive.

In addition, he authored the following works:

- Sodot or Midrash, notes on the construction of the Tabernacle as described in Exodus 25–26. It was edited on the basis of the Munich manuscript by Berliner in Monatsschrift, 1864, pp. 224 et seq.
- An exegesis of Deuteronomy 13, in manuscript.
- Commentary on the Machzor, also in manuscript.
- Glosses on the Pentateuch.
- Commentary on the Song of Songs.
- Commentary on b. Tamid, published Uziel Fuchs (2000).
