= Chayyim Moses ben Isaiah Azriel Cantarini =

Italian rabbi, physician, poet, and writer

Chayyim Moses (Angelo) ben Isaiah Azriel Cantarini was an Italian physician, rabbi, poet, and writer. He lived in the second half of the 17th and the first half of the 18th century at Padua, where he was also instructor in the yeshiva. He published in Italian: Chirurgia Pratica, Padua, 1677. At his death he left the following manuscript works in Hebrew: Haggahot, glosses on some halakhic works of post-Talmudic authors; Mar'eh ha-Seneh (Vision of the Thorn-Bush), a description of a persecution of the Jews at Padua, probably of the same one of which the work of his uncle Isaac Chayyim Cantarini, Pachad Yitzchaq, treats. Responsa of his are also extant in manuscript.

Wolf ("Bibl. Hebr." iii. 565) mentions Cantarini's correspondence with the Christian scholar Unger of Silesia on the history of the Jews in Italy.
