= Tosefta =

Compilation of Jewish oral law from the late 2nd century

The Tosefta (Jewish Babylonian Aramaic: תוספתא, romanized: tosep̄tā "supplement, addition") is a compilation of Jewish Oral Law from the late second century CE, the period of the Mishnah and the Jewish sages known as the Tannaim.

== Background ==
Jewish teachings of the Tannaitic period were characteristically transmitted orally, and consisted of short sayings presented with or without attribution, which were memorized through repetition (Shanah in Hebrew) and recited in halls of study. These teachings were primarily concerned with laws and customs (Halacha), though they also included non-legal traditions (Aggada), as well as supplementary material (Tosefta) which was appended later to traditions which warranted clarification or addition of legal material. The Halacha, Aggada, and Tosefta collectively served as the foundation of the Oral Torah and the primary focus of study for the sages during the first two centuries CE. The oral traditions were no doubt transmitted as different collections by different scholars, though the Babylonian Talmud refers to a fixed work known as Tosefta, which was an integral part of a scholar's education. Geonic sources attest to the existence of a single work named Tosefta which is identical to the Tosefta known today.

== Overview ==
In many ways, the Tosefta acts as a supplement (Toseftā) to the Mishnah. Being nearly three times as long, it often complements the Mishna and expands upon it, and it served as the primary commentary on it for the Amoraim, creators of the Talmuds. The Mishnah (Hebrew: משנה) is the basic compilation of the Oral law of Judaism; according to the tradition, it was compiled in 189 CE. The Tosefta closely corresponds to the Mishnah, with the same divisions for sedarim ("orders") and masekhtot ("tractates"), though there are three tractates in the Mishnah with no corresponding tractates in the Tosefta, those of Tamid, Middot and Kinnim, all at the end of the order of 'Kodashim'. The tractate 'Avot' from the order of 'Nezikin' is also absent from the Tosefta, though 'Avot de-Rabbi Natan' may be considered as filling its place. The number of chapters in each tractate does not necessarily correspond to that of the Mishnah, and the number of Halachot in a given chapter of the Tosefta is at times double that of the corresponding chapter in the Mishnah. Though the order of Halachot in the Tosefta largely parallels that of the Mishnah, it digresses so often that the reason for the digressions has drawn scholarly attention. Many scholars have suggested that the order in the Tosefta follows an earlier version of the Mishna. However, this is most likely inaccurate, as a close literary analysis will show that both texts follow the same order, and the digressions of the Tosefta are premeditated and pedagogical by nature. The Tosefta is mainly written in Mishnaic Hebrew, with some Aramaic.

At times, the text of the Tosefta agrees nearly verbatim with the Mishnah, in others, there are significant differences. The Tosefta often attributes laws that are anonymous in the Mishnah to named Tannaim, or attributes otherwise accredited laws differently. At times it also contradicts the Mishnah in the ruling of Jewish law.

The Tosefta often augments the Mishnah with additional glosses and discussions. It offers additional aggadic and midrashic material, though this is only because it is a larger corpus than the Mishnah and the proportion of this material is identical to both. In some ways the Tosefta continues the Mishnah, as it preserves the opinions and teachings of the later generations of Tanaim, namely that of Rabbi Judah HaNasi and the following generation, which were largely not recorded in the Mishna.

== Origins ==
The question of dating the Tosefta is discussed extensively among scholars. The mention of sages from the generation after Rabbi Judah HaNasi implies that it would necessarily have been redacted after the Mishnah. However, this fact cannot be taken as an indication of the date of the individual traditions included in it, each of which requires its own discussion. Suggestions for dating individual traditions in the Tosefta may be presented through a comparative study of all parallel Tannaitic sources. Another question revolves around the relationship between the Babylonian and Jerusalem Talmuds, which often quote Tannaitic traditions, known as baraitot (external traditions). These traditions are often similar in content and form to parallel traditions in the Mishnah and Tosefta, and are sometimes identical to them. Baraitot are commonly mentioned within Talmudic discussions of Mishnaic passages, and collections of them are attributed to various Amoraic sages; thus, their study would impact conclusions regarding the Tosefta as well.

=== Authorship ===
There is no explicit mention of the author of the Tosefta within the Tosefta itself. Various collections of Tannaitic traditions have been attributed to different sages, including Rabbi Hiyya, Rabbi Hoshaya, and Bar Kappara, all contemporaries of Rabbi Judah HaNasi, and it is possible that these collections played a role in the Tosefta's compilation. A notable tradition in the Talmud, attributed to Rabbi Yochanan, stated that Rabbi Nehemiah, a younger contemporary of Rabbi Akiva, was the author of the anonymous traditions in the Tosefta. According to another passage in the Talmud, the Tosefta was redacted by Hiyya bar Abba and one of his students, Hoshaiah II. The ambiguity in the Talmud ultimately led to disagreement between the Gaonim and Rishonim on the issue of authorship. The majority, including Rabbi Nissim Ben Yaakov, Rabbi Sherira ben Hanina, Maimonides, and Rashi, conclude that Rabbi Hiyya was the author; Menachem HaMeiri suggests Bar Kappara, and a letter from the Cairo Geniza mentions Rabbi Hoshaya as such.

Modern scholarship has proposed many theories as to the identity of the editor of the Tosefta and the manner of its editing. Based on the tradition attributed to Rabbi Yochanan above, some have proposed that Rabbi Nehemia was the editor of the Tosefta as well. Most modern scholars reject this opinion, however many still believe that Rabbi Nehemia held a role in the redaction of the Tosefta, as is hinted at by the numerous mentions of Rabbi Nehemia in the Tosefta versus comparatively rare mentions in the Mishna. A. Schwartz suggested that the Tosefta is a compilation of the traditions extracted from the Mishna of Rabbi Meir as well as earlier baraitot, and this was later supplemented by the traditions extracted by Rabbi Judah HaNasi.

Modern scholarship can be roughly divided into two camps. Some, such as Jacob N. Epstein, theorize that the Tosefta as we have it developed from a proto-Tosefta recension that formed much of the basis for later Amoraic debate in the Talmuds. Others, such as Hanokh Albeck, theorize that the Tosefta is a later compendium of several baraitot collections that were in use during the Amoraic period. According to Epstein's approach, the baraitot in both Talmuds are derived from the ancient Tosefta, with one branch consisting of the Tosefta and the almost identical Baraitot of the Yerushalmi, and another branch consisting of the baraitot of the Bavli. According to the approach presented by Albeck, the baraitot of the Talmuds and the Tosefta drew from a common source.

More recent scholarship, such as that of Yaakov Elman, concludes that since the Tosefta, as we know it, must be dated linguistically as an example of Middle Hebrew 1, it was most likely compiled in early Amoraic times from oral transmission of baraitot. Shamma Friedman has found that the Tosefta draws on relatively early Tannaitic source material and that parts of the Tosefta predate the Mishnah.

== Authority ==
Sherira ben Hanina (987 CE), in his epistle written to the heads of the Jewish community in Kairouan (now in Tunisia), discusses the authority of the Tosefta in relation to the Mishnah. There, he writes:

We do not follow the opinion of R. Ḥiya, as expressed in a Baraita, if he disputes with Rebbe [Judah ha-Nasi]. For example, let us suppose that a certain halacha had originally been a matter of dispute between R. Meir and R. Yosi; but Rebbe [Judah ha-Nasi] decided to record in the Mishnah only R. Meir's opinion [anonymously]. Had R. Ḥiya then come along, in the Tosefta, and stated that the halacha had been originally a matter of dispute – even though it has now been reported anonymously – we follow the Mishnah rather than take up the episode which places the rabbis at variance. Whenever R. Meir and R. Yosi disagree, the halacha follows R. Yosi. Nevertheless, since in the Mishnah, Rebbe [Judah ha-Nasi] mentioned only R. Meir's opinion, we follow R. Meir.

Sherira then brings down the reverse of this example: "Or, let us suppose that Rebbe [Yehuda Ha-Nassi] in the Mishnah records a dispute between R. Meir and R. Yosi. However, R. Ḥiya prefers R. Meir's argument and records it in a Baraita without mentioning R. Yosi's opposing view. In such a case, we do not accept [R. Ḥiya's] decision."

== Character ==
At times the commentary character of the Tosefta is explicit, as it will address the reasons for various statements of the Mishna in the form of questions and answers. In other instances the Tosefta will provide a commentary which is interwoven with the words of the Mishna, or attached to the end of a Mishnaic passage as an appendix. Occasionally the Tosefta will quote a Mishna from a different chapter or tractate in order to illuminate the Mishna under discussion. When the Mishna discusses a prohibition in any given topic, the Tosefta will often supplement it with what may be permitted, and conversely when a permitted action is discussed, the Tosefta may supplement it with the prohibitions related to it. In certain cases the Mishna will provide the Halachic decree regarding the result of a certain sequence of actions, and the Tosefta will give the decree regarding the result of an opposite sequence. The Tosefta may also provide opinions differing from those mentioned in the Mishna, as well as reasoning, background and scriptural proofs for Mishnaic decrees. Finally, the Tosefta may use the Mishna as a point of departure for topics almost entirely absent from the Mishna.

The main two layers in the Tosefta consist of the teachings of the students of Rabbi Akiva and those of the following generation, the latter being a layer largely not documented in the Mishna. Accordingly, certain topics discussed generally in the Mishna will be expanded and will receive a detailed elaboration, and previously undiscussed cases will be covered.

== Manuscripts, editions commentaries, and translations ==
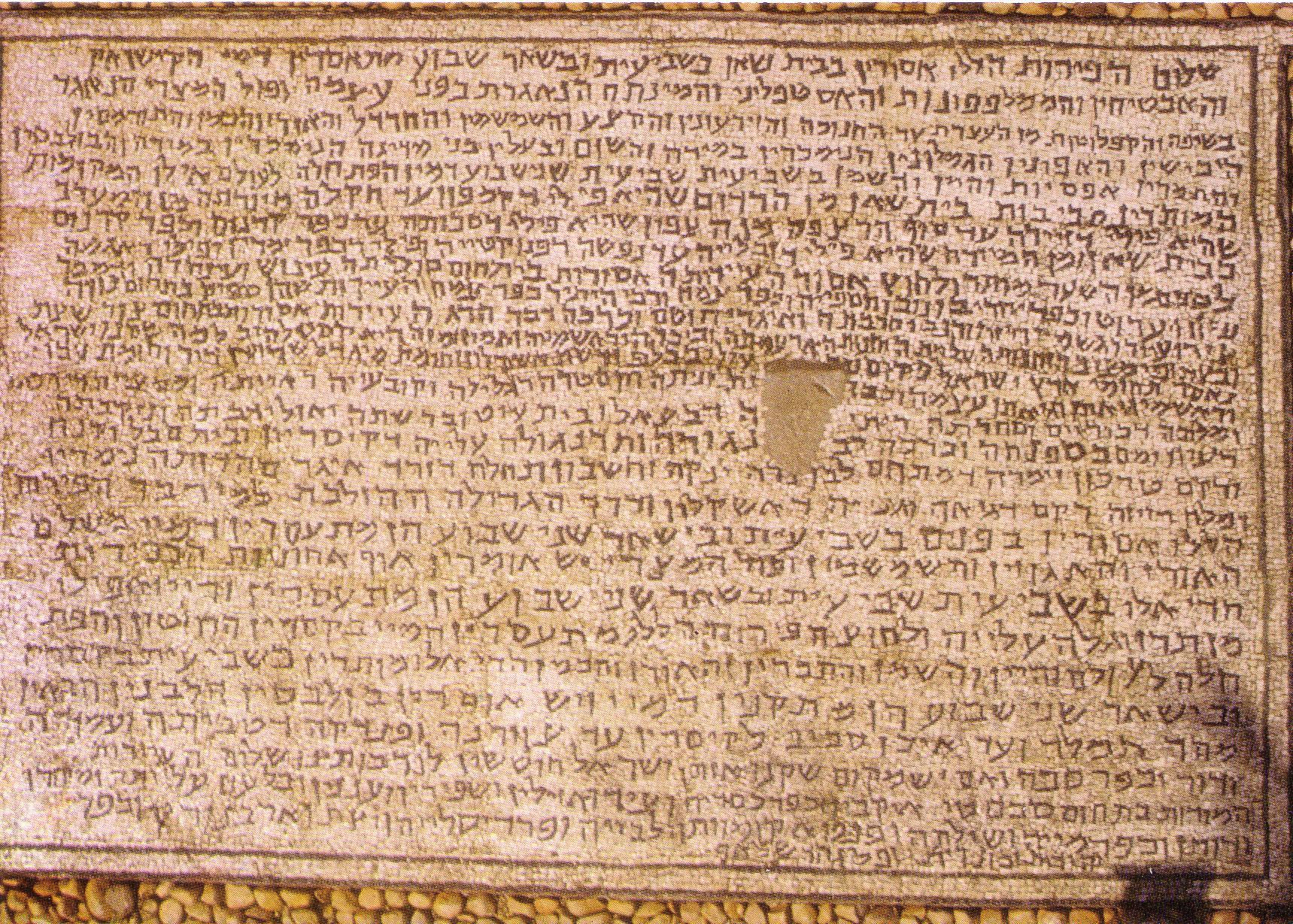
Mosaic of Rehob (3rd–6th century CE), quoting a baraita which also appears in the Tosefta (Shviit 4)

=== Manuscripts ===
Three manuscripts exist of the Tosefta:

- 'Vienna' (late 13th century; Oesterreichische Nationalbibliothek Cod hebr. 20; the only complete manuscript)
- 'Erfurt' (12th century; Berlin – Staatsbibliothek (Preußischer Kulturbesitz) Or. fol. 1220)
- 'London' (15th century; London – British Library Add. 27296; contains Seder Mo'ed only)

The Editio Princeps was printed in Venice in 1521 as an addendum to Isaac Alfasi's Halakhot.

All four of these sources, together with many Cairo Geniza fragments, have been published online by Bar Ilan University in the form of a searchable database.

=== Editions ===
Two critical editions have been published. The first was that of Moses Samuel Zuckermandl in 1882, which relied heavily on the Erfurt manuscript of the Tosefta. Zuckermandl's work has been characterized as "a great step forward" for its time. This edition was reprinted in 1970 by Rabbi Saul Lieberman, with additional notes and corrections.

In 1955, Saul Lieberman first began publishing his monumental Tosefta ki-Feshutah. Between 1955 and 1973, ten volumes of the new edition were published, representing the text and the commentaries on the entire orders of Zera'im, Mo'ed and Nashim. In 1988, three volumes were published posthumously on the order of Nezikin, including tractates Bava Kama, Bava Metzia, and Bava Batra. Lieberman's work has been called the "pinnacle of modern Tosefta studies."

=== Commentaries ===
Major commentaries on the Tosefta include those by:

- David Pardo: Chasdei David; Originally published in Livorno (1776), and printed in editions of the Vilna Shas.
- Yehezkel Abramsky: Hazon Yehezkel (24 volumes, 1925–1975 in Hebrew).
- Saul Lieberman: Tosefet Rishonim, Jerusalem 1937.
- Jacob Neusner and his students (in a series called A History of the Mishnaic Law, 1978–87).

=== Translations ===
The Tosefta has been translated into English by Jacob Neusner and his students in the commentary cited above and was also published separately as The Tosefta: translated from the Hebrew (6 vols, 1977–86).

Translations of the tosefta are in various stages of progress at www.sefaria.org. Other attempts such as by Eli Gurevich's English translation are also being made..

== See also ==
- Gemara
- Old Synagogue (Erfurt)
- Rabbinic literature
