= Judah ben Samuel ha-Kohen Cantarini =

Italian physician and rabbi

- Born: c. 1650; Padua, Italy
- Died: April 28, 1694; Padua, Italy
- Occupations: physician, rabbi

Judah (Leon) ben Samuel (Simon) ha-Kohen Cantarini (c. 1650, in Padua – 28 April 1694, in Padua) was an Italian physician and rabbi.

== Background ==
He had a large practise among the Christian as well as the Jewish population of that city, visiting the poorer of his patients four times a day without charge. He taught the Talmud, in which he was very learned. He also officiated as preacher. A letter of his is extant, addressed to Jacob Lebet-Levi, and dealing with a legal quarrel in which Cantarini was involved. This letter, which testifies to his thorough knowledge of the Talmud, is written in a very pure and classical Hebrew. At Cantarini's death his nephew, Isaac Chayyim Cantarini, wrote his obituary.
