= Isaac Chayyim Cantarini =

Italian poet, writer, physician, rabbi, and preacher

Isaac Chayyim Cantarini, also known as Isaacus Viva, (2 February 1644 – 8 June 1723) was an Italian poet, writer, physician, rabbi and preacher. He studied Hebrew and the Talmud with Solomon Marini, author of the Tiqqun 'Olam, and with the poet Moses Catalano. His instructor in secular subjects was Bernardo de Laurentius. He was the nephew of Judah ben Samuel ha-Kohen Cantarini, also a physician and rabbi of Padua.

== Biography ==
Cantarini was born in Padua, where he received his diploma as physician on 11 February 1664. In addition to following the profession of medicine, he often preached in synagogues. His sermons were frequently attended by Christians, the number of these on one occasion being so great that the Jews had to find seats in the women's gallery. He also taught in the yeshiva, and officiated as cantor, especially on the Day of Atonement. As he had a thorough knowledge of the Talmud, his decisions were often sought in halakic cases.

Cantarini had an extensive medical practice, especially among the patricians outside Padua, but at the end of his life, having lost his property through others, he was in straitened circumstances. He died in Padua. Many elegies were written in his memory, among others by his pupil Moshe Chaim Luzzatto (Venice, 1728).

== His style ==
In his poetical writings Cantarini based his language almost exclusively on that of the Bible; his sentences containing, in addition to innumerable conceits, allusions to Biblical expressions. The contents of his works must be judged apart from their unpleasing form, being remarkable for pithy sense and elegant definition.

The most important of his Hebrew works is Pachad Yitzchaq (The Fear of Isaac), a description of the attack on the ghetto at Padua by the Christian populace on 20 August 1684, published at Amsterdam in 1685. This work contains a detailed account of all the incidents, in most of which he had taken part (Otzar Nechmad, iii. 131); and many documents of the governments of Padua and Venice are therein translated and quoted in Hebrew. An account of the internal condition of the Jewish community, together with statistics, serves as an introduction (p. 10). The author develops entirely modern theories on the causes of these occurrences in the political as well as the physical world (5a et seq.). Noteworthy also is his decided tolerance toward Christians. (See, for instance, pp. 9a, 23g).

== His poems ==
The following poems were published by Cantarini; they are nearly all occasional: Pi Sefarim (Mouth of Books), festal songs written when the teachers of the yeshivah decided to include the study of the treatise of Chullin (Venice, 1669). A poem in the form of a psalm, on the delivery of the community from the hands of the populace August 20, 1684, is printed in the Pachad Yitzchaq (p. 51b), which was formerly read every year in the synagogue on the anniversary of the attack (10 Elul). Other poems are printed in his works ‘Eqeb Rab and ‘Et Qetz (see below), and in the prefaces to the Kebunnat Abraham of Abraham Cohen, and the Ma'aseh Tobiah of Tobias Cohen.

Cantarini also wrote a paraphrase of the majority of the Psalms. Many of his poems in manuscript were in Ghirondi's possession. Some of his poems have also been inscribed on the walls of the large Ashkenazic synagogue of Padua, which was built during his life. His ‘Et Qetz (Time of the End) deals with the time of the advent of the Messiah (Amsterdam, 1710), while the ‘Eqeb Rab (Great Consequence), is a collection of responsa in Hebrew and Italian, concerning the oath which the tax-collectors of the community of Padua took before the wardens (Venice, 1711). The manuscript of his Leb Chakam (Heart of the Wise) was in Ghirondi's possession. His Chayye Besarim (Physical Life), Leb Marpeh (Healing Heart), and Shibat Tishbi (Reply to the Tishbite), a polemic against Elijah Levita's Tishbi were not printed before the twentieth century. Cantarini's Hebrew letters, addressed to the Christian scholar Unger of Silesia, are interesting as containing notices on the Jewish writers of Italy. Halakic responsa of his are printed in Isaac Lampronti's Pachad Yitzchaq and in Simson Morpurgo's Shemesh Tzedaqah.

== Latin works ==
In Latin Cantarini wrote the Vindex Sanguinis, a reply to the work on blood accusation of Jacob Geuze (Amsterdam, 1681). Three Latin letters by him have also been published; one of them dealing with natural history, is addressed to his teacher Bernardo de Laurentius (Padua, 1856, ed. Osimo).

An Italian responsum of his is mentioned (translated into Hebrew in Isaac Lampronti's Pachad Yitzchaq). Many of his Italian sermons in manuscript were in Ghirondi's possession. There have also been preserved several consulti (partly in Latin) on medical subjects (Otzar Nechmad, iii. 148).
