= Kodashim =

Fifth Order of the Mishnah and Talmud

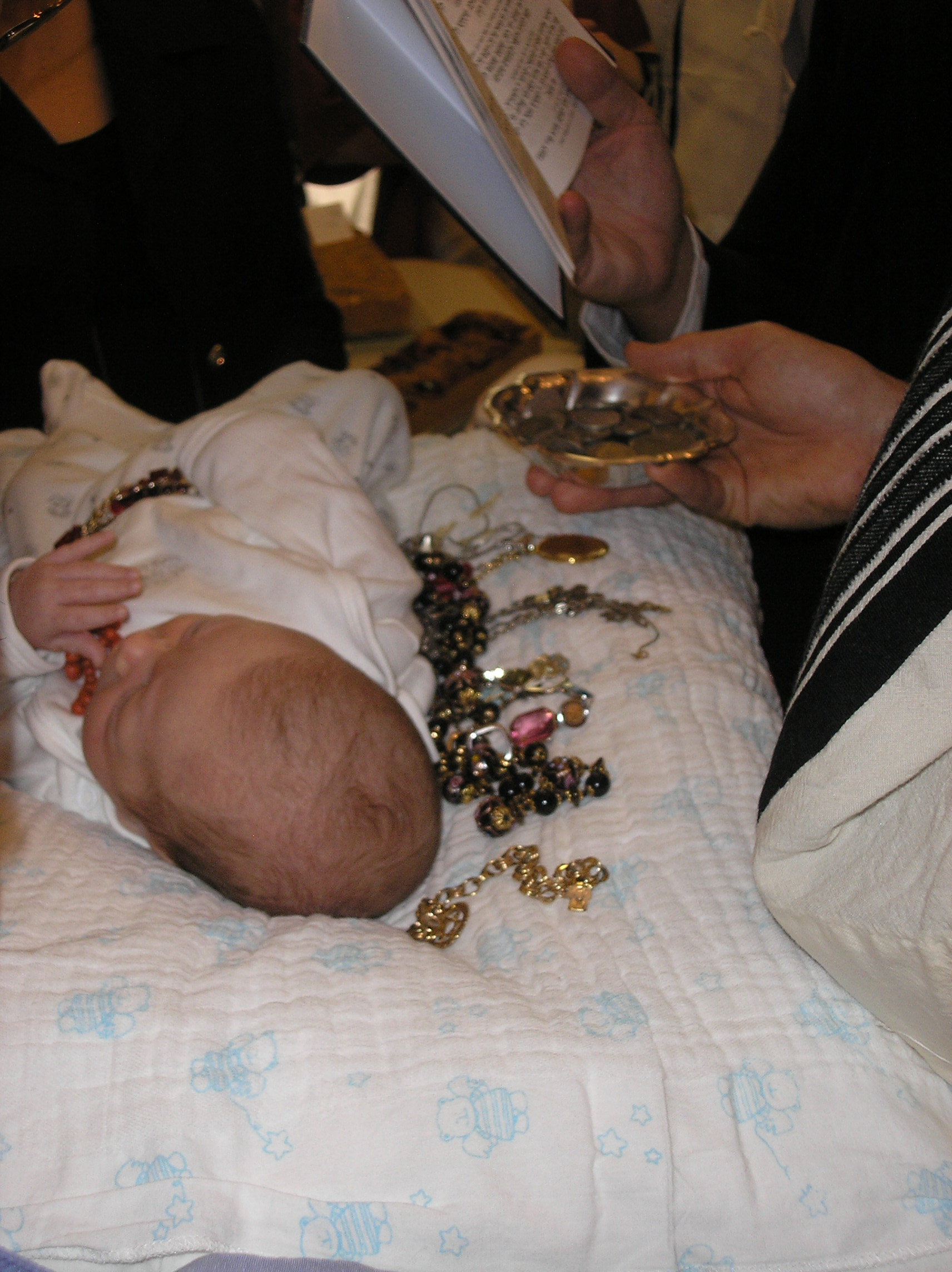
Pidyon haben

Kodashim (Hebrew: קׇדָשִׁים, romanized: Qoḏāšim, lit. 'holy things') is the fifth of the six orders, or major divisions, of the Mishnah, Tosefta and the Talmud, and deals largely with the services within the Temple in Jerusalem, its maintenance and design, the korbanot, or sacrificial offerings that were offered there, and other subjects related to these topics, as well as, notably, the topic of kosher slaughter.

== Topics ==
This Seder (order, or division) of the Mishnah is known as Kodashim (“sacred things” or “sanctities”), because it deals with subjects connected with Temple service and ritual slaughter of animals (shehitah). The term kodashim, in the Biblical context, applies to the sacrifices, the Temple and its furnishings, as well as the priests who carried out the duties and ceremonies of its service; and it is with these things, places and people that Kodashim is mainly concerned. The title Kodashim is apparently an abbreviation of Shehitat Kodashim ("the slaughter of sacred animals") since the main, although not the only subject of this order is sacrifices.

The topics of this Seder are primarily the sacrifices of animals, birds, and meal offerings, the laws of bringing a sacrifice, such as the sin offering and the guilt offering, and the laws of misappropriation of sacred property. In addition, the order contains a description of the Second Temple (tractate Middot), and a description and rules about the daily sacrifice service in the Temple (tractate Tamid). The order also includes tractate Hullin, which concerns the slaughter of animals for non-sacrificial use, as well as other dietary laws applying to meat and animal products. Although Hullin is about the slaughter of animals for non-sacrificial, and therefore unsanctified purposes, because the rules about the proper slaughter of animals and birds, and their ritual fitness for use were considered to be an integral part of the concept of holiness in Judaism, they were also included in the order regarding “holy things”.

== Contents ==
Seder Kodashim comprises eleven tractates, with a total of 90 chapters, as follows:

- Zevachim (“Sacrifices”), with fourteen chapters, and originally called Shehitat Kodashim ("slaughtering of the holy animals") deals with the sacrificial system of the Temple period, namely the laws for animal and bird offerings, and the conditions which make them acceptable or not, as specified in the Torah, primarily in the book of Leviticus (Lev 1:2 and on).
- Menachot ("Meal Offerings"), comprising thirteen chapters, deals with the rules regarding the preparation and presentation of grain-meal and drink offerings, including the meal-offering that was burnt on the altar and the remainder that was consumed by the priests as specified in the Torah (Lev 2:1 and on); the bringing of the omer of barley (Lev 23:10), the two loaves (Lev 23:17), and the showbread (Lev 24:5).
- Hullin or Chullin ("Ordinary or Mundane"), also called also Shehitat Hullin ("slaughtering of non-consecrated animals"), has twelve chapters and deals with the laws for slaughtering animals and birds for meat for ordinary use, as opposed to sacred use, with other rules relating to the eating of meat, and with the dietary laws in general.
- Bekhorot ("Firstborns"), consists of nine chapters and deals mainly with the sanctification and redemption of human and animal firstborns, as specified in the Torah (Ex 13:2, 12–13, Num 18:15–17 and Deut 15:19–23), and the tithing of cattle (Lev 27:32–33).
- Arakhin ("Dedications" or “Estimations”), with nine chapters, deals with the rules for determining the amount which must be paid in fulfilment of a vow to dedicate to the Temple the 'market-value' or 'worth' of a person, field or object in accordance with the Torah (Lev 27:1–34), or voluntary contributions to the upkeep of the Temple, and also with laws relating to the Jubilee year (Lev 25:8).
- Temurah ("Substitution"), comprising seven chapters, outlines the rules about the substitution of one sacrificial animal for another in accordance with the Torah's instructions (Lev 27:10).
- Keritot ("Excisions"), with six chapters, deals with the transgressions for which the penalty is karet, meaning, sins punishable by premature or sudden death, or being cut off from the community of Israel, if done deliberately, and the type of sin-offering sacrifice that had to be offered to effect atonement if the transgression was committed in error.
- Me'ilah (“Sacrilege” or "Trespass"), with six chapters, deals with laws concerning disrespectful treatment of property belonging to the Temple or using holy objects in a prohibited manner, and with restitution for the misappropriation of Temple property, in accordance with Lev 5:15–16.
- Tamid ("The Daily Sacrifice", lit. “The Continual [Offering]”), with seven chapters (in most editions), outlines the Temple service for the daily morning and evening sacrifice, known as the Korban Tamid, in accordance with the Torah (Ex 29:38–42 and Num 28:2–8).
- Middot ("Measurements" or “Dimensions”), comprises five chapters containing descriptions of the Second Temple's architecture including its courts, gates and halls; its furnishings such as the Altar; and an account of the service of the priestly workshifts in the Temple.
- Kinnim ("Nests"), with three chapters, deals with the instructions regarding the offering of birds, in penitence for certain offences and certain conditions of uncleanness, as described in the Torah (Lev 1:14, Lev 5:7and Lev 12:8); and discusses the case in which birds belonging to different persons or to different offerings have become mixed up with one another; the name of the tractate (nests) refers to the pairs of birds prescribed in the Torah as offerings (Lev 5:1–10).

== Structure ==
This Seder, or order, has eleven tractates, arranged, like most of the orders of the Mishnah, mostly in descending sequence according to the number of chapters.

The traditional reasoning for the order of the tractates according to Maimonides, beyond the ordering according to number of chapters, is that Zevahim is first as it deals with the main physical purpose of the Temple, namely, animal sacrifices. Menahot continuing the subject of offerings, and so is placed next, according to the scriptural order and the status of meal-offerings as supplementary to the meat offerings. After dealing with offerings to the Temple, Hullin follows, dealing with the related topic of "secular" slaughter for meat. Bekhorot, Arakhin and Temurah all discuss auxiliary laws of sanctity and follow the order in which they appear in the Torah. Keritot then follows, as it largely discusses the offering for the transgression of certain commandments, and Me'ilah follows that as it also deals with transgressions of sanctity, although of a lighter nature. After dealing with laws, two mostly descriptive tractates were added, Tamid discussing the daily sacrifice and Middot which overviews the Temple in Jerusalem. Finally, Kinnim was placed last as its laws deal with accidental and rarely occurring situations.

In the Babylonian Talmud the sequence of the treatises follows the general order except that Bekorot is before Hullin, and Ḳinnim is placed before Tamid and Middot.

== Talmud and Tosefta ==
As part of the Mishnah, the first major composition of Jewish law and ethics based on the Oral Torah, Kodashim was compiled and edited between 200 and 220 CE by Judah ha-Nasi and his colleagues. Subsequent generations produced a series of commentaries and deliberations relating to the Mishnah, known as the Gemara, which together with the Mishna are the Talmud, one produced in the Land of Israel c. 300–350 CE (the Jerusalem Talmud), and second, more extensive Talmud compiled in Babylonia and published c. 450–500 CE (the Babylonian Talmud).

In the Babylonian Talmud, all the tractates have Gemara for all their chapters except for Tamid which has it only for three chapters and Middot and Kinnim which don't have any

Although the subject matter was no longer directly relevant to life in the Babylonian academies, the Gemara was motivated by the idea that the study of the laws of the Temple service is a substitute for the service itself. Also, the rabbinic sages wanted to merit the rebuilding of the Temple by paying special attention to these laws. However, in the modern Daf Yomi cycle and in the printed editions of the Babylonian Talmud, the Mishnah for the last two tractates are added at the end, to “complete” the order.

The Jerusalem Talmud has no Gemara on any of the tractates of Kodashim. Maimonides, however, mentions of the existence of a Jerusalem Talmud Gemara to Kodashim; however, it is doubtful he had seen it, as he is not known to have cited it anywhere. Nonetheless, this order was a subject of study in the Talmudic academies of the Land of Israel, as many statements contained in the Gemara of the Babylonian Talmud are attributed to the rabbinic scholars known as Amoraim in the Land of Israel. The assumption is that there was once a Jerusalem Talmud Gemara to Kodashim but that it has been lost.

There is a Tosefta for the tractates Zevahim, Hullin, Bekhorot, Arakhin, Temurah, Me'ilah, and Keritot. Tamid, Middot and Kinnim have no Tosefta.
