= Tamid =

Tractate of the Mishnah and the Talmud

Tamid (Hebrew: תָמִיד, romanized: tāmiḏ, lit. 'daily offerings') is the ninth tractate in Kodashim, which is the fifth of the six orders of the Mishnah, Tosefta, and the Talmud.

The main subject of Tamid is the morning and evening burnt offerings (Exodus 29:38–42; Numbers 28:3–8), but it also deals with other Temple ceremonies. The tractate includes information about the Temple Service from sages who had been present at the Temple and witnessed the service. This tractate contains few disagreements between the sages and few exegetical derivations. It is written as a historical description of the service.

== Mishnah ==
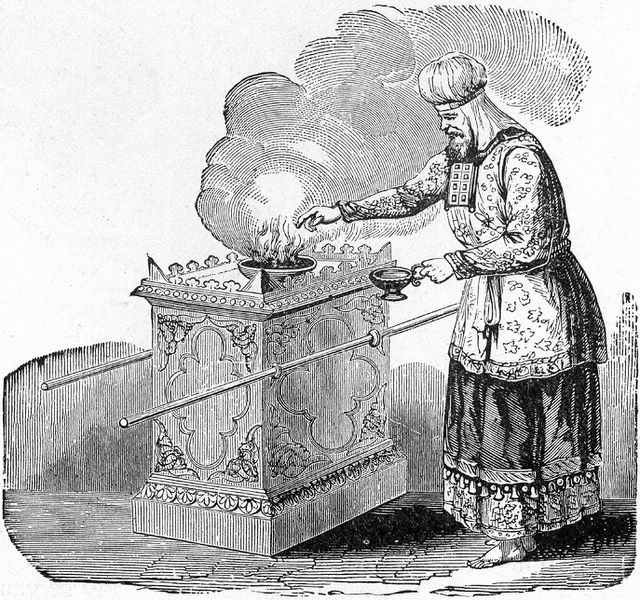
High Priest Offering Incense on the Altar

The Mishnah on Tamid is divided into seven chapters (six in Lowe's edition of the Mishnah), containing 34 paragraphs in all:

- Chapter 1: The priests kept watch in three places in the Temple; where the young priests were on guard, and where the older ones slept who held the keys (§ 1); all who sought admission to remove the ashes from the altar were obliged to prepare themselves by a ritual bath before the officer appeared; when he appeared and when he called upon the priests to draw lots (§ 2); the mutual greetings of the priests (§ 3); how the one chosen by lot to remove the ashes from the altar performed his duties (§ 4).
- Chapter 2: How the other priests continued the task of cleansing the altar (§ 1); the piling of the ashes, in the center of the altar, into a hillock, which was considered an adornment (§ 2); the supply of fuel for the altar and the kind of wood used (§ 3); the arrangement of the wood and fire in layers (§§ 4-5).
- Chapter 3: The drawing of lots for various official duties, such as slaying the tamid, sprinkling its blood, and cleansing the altar and the candlestick (§ 1); the announcement of the time of slaying the morning sacrifice (§ 2); the bringing of the sacrificial lamb, which was given to drink from a golden cup before it was killed; who was charged with taking it to the place of sacrifice (§§ 3-5); the mode of cleansing the inner altar and the candlesticks, together with the statement, in conformity with Ezek. xliv. 2, that no man ever passed through the postern on the southern side of the large door; how the opening of this great portal was heard as far as Jericho, as was the sound of the trumpets and other music of the Temple (§§ 6-9).
- Chapter 4: The ritual for killing and dismembering the sacrificial lamb; how the parts of the sacrifice were brought to the altar.
- Chapter 5: The daily morning prayer in the Temple, which was supplemented on the Sabbath by a benediction on the division of priests who then completed their duties (§ 1); the drawing of lots for offering incense; the question as to whether one might make this offering twice, and the mode of burning the incense (§§ 2-5); the "magrefah," a musical instrument used in the Temple ( see Organ), and the various priestly and Levitical meanings of the signals given on it (§ 6).
- Chapter 6: Additional details in regard to offering incense.
- Chapter 7: The ritual used in case the high priest himself performed the sacrifice; the mode in which he pronounced the benediction on the people; the divergency of this benediction from that bestowed by the priests outside the Temple, and the music which accompanied the high priest's performance of his functions (§§ 1-3); enumeration of the Psalms sung by the Levites in the Temple on the various days of the week (§ 4).

== Talmud ==
The extant gemara on Tamid in the Babylonian Talmud covers only three chapters of the tractate (chapters 1, 2, and 4). It is the shortest tractate of gemara in the Babylonian Talmud consisting of only seven pages. There are approximately only 4,600 words in the tractate. It contains several sayings and ethical maxims of importance, as well as stories and legends of much interest. For example: "The Pentateuch and the writings of the Prophets and the mishnaic sages contain specific exaggerated expressions which can not be taken literally, such as, 'The cities are great and walled up to heaven' (Deut 1:28)".

It also contains legends concerning Alexander the Great, his conversation with the sages of the South, his journey to Africa, and his adventures among the Amazons and at the gate of paradise.

== Commentaries ==
=== Rishonim ===
Almost none of the famous early commentators extended their work to Tamid. Surviving commentaries include:

- The "Mefaresh" (commentator). Occasionally attributed to Samuel ben Meir or to Rashi, but it cites Rashi's genuine commentary to b. Shabbat 19b by name on b. Tamid 25b s.v. בית המוקד. Solomon Adeni writes that it is assembled from Rashi's commentary on b. Yoma (b. Tamid 33b), but only some content can be found there. On b. Tamid 27b s.v. שריא the Mefaresh cites פירוש רבינו ש"י to Yoma as his teacher, but the citation does not match Rashi's commentary. Variously attributed to Shemaiah of Soissons (The Vilna printers' Shita Mequbetzet 28a:5, 29b:5, 31a:4, 31b:3, appears to refer to the Mefaresh as ר"ש; these comments are not found in Adeni's holograph manuscript), but there is a different commentary to b. Tamid under his name found MS Opp. 726 and published by Fuchs (2000), and Isaac ben Baruch, a Tosafist, though pseudo-Abraham b. David quotes a different commentary on b. Tamid in his name (27b, s.v. בית המוקד.).
- The Anonymous German Commentary published by Fuchs (2000).
- Shemaiah of Soissons, found MS Opp. 726 and published by Fuchs (2000).
- That attributed to Gershom ben Judah, from the school of Isaac ben Judah (c. 1064-1100). This commentary cites no German but two French words.
- That mistakenly attributed to Abraham ben David, possibly the work of Baruch ben Isaac (according to Abraham Epstein; Ephraim Urbach disagreed) or Eliezer ben Joel HaLevi (according to David Luria). Zecharias Frankel believed the author Sephardic, while Heimann Michael argued he was Ashkenazic. Yaakov Sussmann agrees with Michael; see also his sources n. 53-4.
- That attributed to Asher ben Jehiel. Epstein believed this commentary, which explicitly disagrees with Asher b. Yechiel's genuine commentary to b. Berakhot, to be the work of another scholar.
- Samuel ben Isaac, an otherwise unknown Franco-German rishon, published by Bezalel Zolty (1986). Little original content.
- Menachem HaMeiri, almost entirely a commentary on the Mishna but with a few notes on the Gemara as well.

=== Acharonim ===
- The Binyan Shelomo leChokhmat Betzalel of Solomon Adeni (d. 1625). Among this work's sources were the notes of Adeni's master, Bezalel Ashkenazi; the printers call it Shita Mequbetzet.
- Baruch Bendit of Zabłudów, Ner Tamid (1789)
- Moses Sofer, Hiddushim (1934) [before 1839]
- Haim Palachi, Einei kol hai (1878) [before 1868]
- Moshe Greenwald, Olat Tamid im Minhat Tamid (e.p. 1936)
- Yair Goldshtuf, Yair netivot al Tamid (1997)
- Amitai ben-David, Ner Tamid (2004)
