= Temple denial =

Historical claim

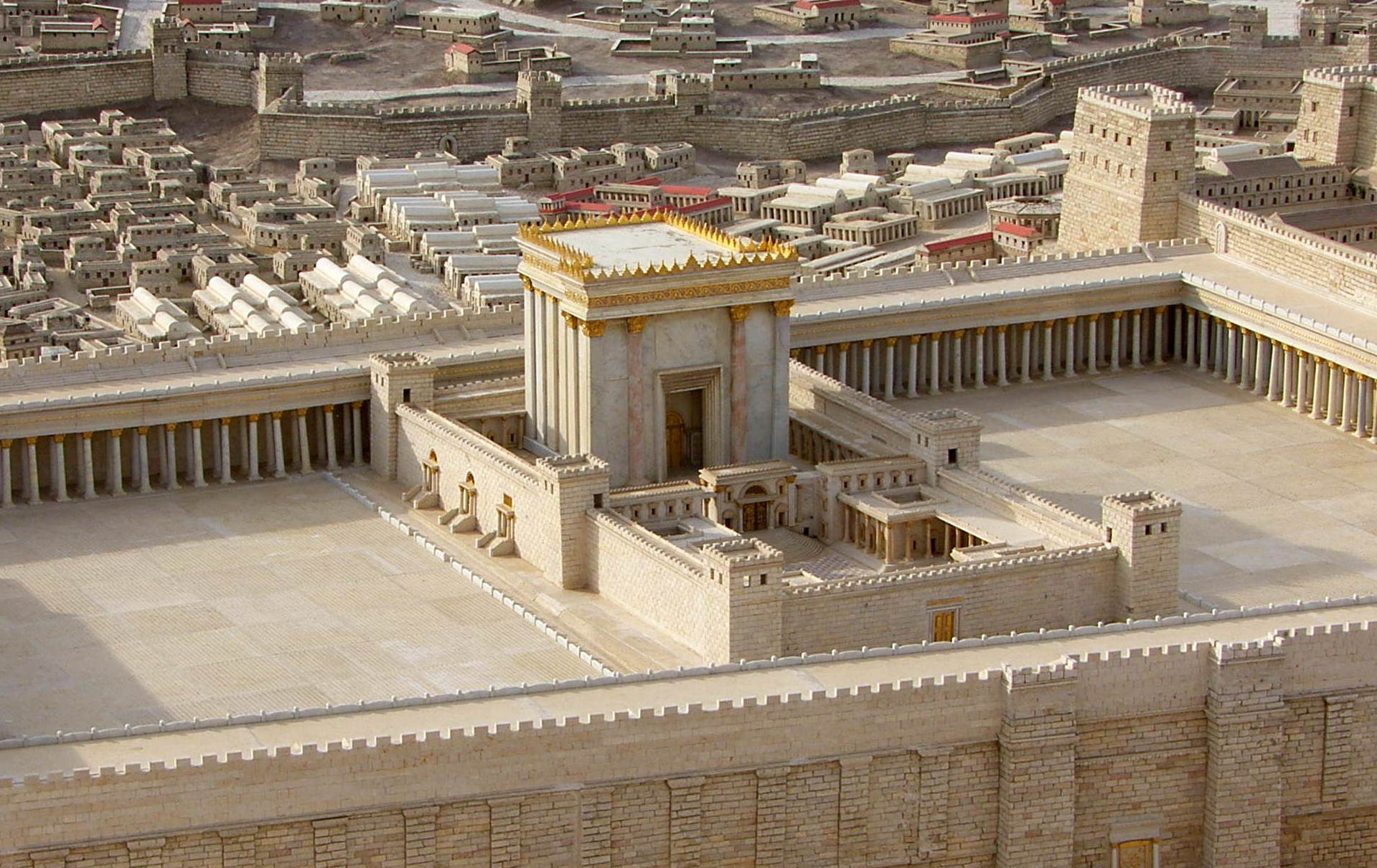
Reconstruction of the Second Temple in the Holyland Model of Jerusalem

Temple denial is the claim that the successive temples in Jerusalem either did not exist or they did exist but were not constructed in Jerusalem on the site of Haram al-Sharif, also known as Temple Mount. This claim has been advanced by Islamic political leaders, religious figures, intellectuals, and authors, including then-Palestinian Authority President Yasser Arafat, who made statements placing the Temple in Nablus in 2000.

These claims stand in contrast to accounts of the Temples in Jerusalem which appear in the Hebrew Bible, as well as accounts of Jesus in the New Testament, contemporaneous accounts by historian Josephus, and documents published by the Supreme Muslim Council led by Amin al-Husseini, which place the Jewish Temple in Jerusalem on the Temple Mount.

== Background ==
The Temple Mount is the holiest site in Judaism. According to the Hebrew Bible, the First Temple was built by King Solomon, the son of King David, in 957 BCE, and was destroyed by the Neo-Babylonian Empire in 586 BCE. The Second Temple was constructed under the auspices of Zerubbabel in 516 BCE, was renovated by King Herod, and was destroyed by the Roman Empire in 70 CE. Scholars agree that the two temples existed on the Temple Mount during these time periods. While no scientific excavations have ever been conducted on the Temple Mount, extensive physical evidence for the Second Temple has been found in excavations in its vicinity.

The Temple also plays a major role in the Christian New Testament, including in the narrative of the Cleansing of the Temple, which tells of Jesus throwing out merchants and money changers from the Temple in Jerusalem so that it could serve its proper role as a "house of prayer".

Jewish-Roman historian Josephus, in the Jewish War (c. 75 CE) and Antiquities of the Jews (c. 94 CE), documents the details of the location, design and the ultimate destruction of the Second Temple in Jerusalem.

Among Muslims, the whole plaza is revered and it is referred to as the Haram al-Sharif or "the Noble Sanctuary". It is the third holiest site in Islam. Muslims believe that it is the place from which Muhammad began his Night Journey. The plaza is dominated by two monumental structures originally built during the Rashidun and early Umayyad caliphates after the city's capture in 661 CE: the al-Aqsa Mosque and the Dome of the Rock, near the center of the hill, which was completed in 692 CE, making it one of the oldest extant Islamic structures in the world. It stands where past Jewish temples are commonly believed to have stood.

Early Islam regarded the Foundation Stone as the location of the First Temple, or Solomon's Temple, and the construction of the Dome of the Rock on the Temple Mount sought to glorify Jerusalem by presenting Islam as a continuation of Judaism and Christianity. Muslim interpretations of the Quran agree that the Mount is the site of the Temple originally built by Solomon (who is considered a prophet in Islam) which was later destroyed. After the construction the temple was used for the worship of the one God by many prophets of Islam, including Jesus. Other Muslim scholars have used the Torah (called Tawrat in Arabic) to expand on the details of the temple. The term Bayt al-Maqdis (or Bayt al-Muqaddas), which frequently appears as a name of Jerusalem in early Islamic sources, is a cognate of the Hebrew term bēt ha-miqdāsh (בית המקדש), the Temple in Jerusalem. Mujir al-Din, a 15th century Jerusalemite chronicler, mentions an earlier tradition related by al-Wasti, according to which "after David built many cities and the situation of the children of Israel was improved, he wanted to construct Bayt al-Maqdis and build a dome over the rock in the place that Allah sanctified in Aelia."

According to Yitzhak Reiter, "during the twentieth century, against the backdrop of the struggle between the Zionist and the Palestinian-Arab national movements, a new Arab-Muslim trend of denying Jewish attachment to the Temple Mount arose".

== Denial efforts ==
=== Waqf guidebooks ===
A Brief Guide to al-Haram al-Sharif, a booklet published in 1925 by the "Supreme Muslim Council", a body established by British authorities to administer waqfs and headed by Amin al-Husseini during the British Mandate period, states on page 4: "The site is one of the oldest in the world. Its sanctity dates from the earliest (perhaps from pre-historic) times. Its identity with the site of Solomon's Temple is beyond dispute. This, too, is the spot, according to universal belief, on which 'David built there an altar unto the Lord, and offered burnt offerings and peace offerings.'(2 Samuel 24:25)"

According to the New York Times, after the establishment of Israel in 1948, the Waqf's guidebooks have been stripped of references to Solomon's Temple, whose location it had previously described as 'beyond dispute.'"

=== Remarks by Yasser Arafat ===
According to Dennis Ross, at the 2000 Camp David Summit, then-Palestinian National Authority President Yasser Arafat told then-American President Bill Clinton that "Solomon's Temple was not in Jerusalem, but Nablus." In the recollection of then-Prime Minister of Israel Ehud Barak, referring to a conversation he had with Clinton, Arafat said to the American President, "there is nothing there" (i.e., no trace of a temple on the Temple Mount).

Ross later wrote about an August 2000 meeting he had with Arafat: "Since we would be discussing the options on the Haram, I anticipated that Arafat might well again declare that the Temple—the most sacred place in Jewish tradition—did not exist in Jerusalem, but was in Nablus. ... I wanted Gamal, a Christian of Coptic origin who was originally from Egypt, to tell Arafat that this was an outrageous attempt to delegitimize the Israeli connection to Jerusalem. ... Finally, after nearly ten minutes of increasing invective, I intervened and said 'Mr. Chairman, regardless of what you think, the President of the United States knows that the Temple existed in Jerusalem. If he hears you denying its existence there, he will never again take you seriously. My advice to you is never again raise this issue in his presence.'"

On September 25, 2003, when a delegation of Arab leaders from northern Israel visited the Muqata'a compound in Ramallah to show solidarity during the Second Intifada, they were surprised when Arafat lectured them for approximately a quarter-hour on al-Aqsa, claiming that the Jewish temple was not in Jerusalem, but in Yemen. He claimed to have visited Yemen and been shown the location of Solomon's Temple.

=== Remarks by Mahmoud Abbas ===
On May 15, 2023, during a speech to the United Nations, Mahmoud Abbas, President of the Palestinian Authority, claimed there is no proof of Jewish ties to the area of the al-Aqsa compound in Jerusalem. He falsely stated that "They [Israel] dug under al-Aqsa… they dug everywhere and they could not find anything".

=== Other occurrences ===
In an interview with an Israeli newspaper in 1998, Ikrima Sabri, then Grand Mufti of Jerusalem, stated, "I heard that your Temple was in Nablus or perhaps Bethlehem." In an interview to Die Welt on January 17, 2001, Sabri further claimed that: "There is not the slightest sign of the previous existence of the Jewish temple on this site. There is not a single stone in the entire city that refers to Jewish history [...] It is the art of the Jews to deceive the world. They can't fool us with that. There is not a single stone in the Western Wall that has anything to do with Jewish history. The Jews have no legitimate claim to this wall, either religiously or historically."

In 2002, Zaki al-Ghul, titular mayor of East Jerusalem, claimed in the Al-Quds conference in Amman that King Solomon reigned over the Arabian Peninsula and erected his Temple there, rather than in Jerusalem.

In 2015, Sheikh Muhammad Ahmad Hussein, the current Grand Mufti of Jerusalem, said in an interview with Israel's Channel 2 that there has never been a Jewish temple on the Temple Mount, and the site has been home to a mosque "from the creation of the world". He also claimed that "This is the Al-Aqsa Mosque that Adam, peace be upon him, or during his time, the angels built".

== Analysis ==
Dore Gold, president of the Jerusalem Center for Public Affairs and former Israeli ambassador to the United Nations, used the term "Temple denial" in his 2007 book, The Fight for Jerusalem: Radical Islam, the West, and the Future of the Holy City. Yitzhak Reiter describes the growing tendency of Islamic authorities to deny the existence of the Jewish Temples on the Temple Mount, characterizing it as part of a campaign to increase the status of Jerusalem and the Temple Mount in Islam as a part of the effort to turn Jerusalem into a Muslim city under Arab governance. The New York Times writes that "Temple denial, increasingly common among Palestinian leaders, also has a long history: After Israel became a state in 1948, the Waqf removed all references to King Solomon's Temple from its guidebooks. Previously, it said that Solomon's Temple was located on the site, a fact which was 'beyond dispute'."

David Hazony described the phenomenon as "a campaign of intellectual erasure... aimed at undermining the Jewish claim to any part of the land", and he compared the phenomenon to Holocaust denial.

== Reactions ==
=== International organizations ===
In January 2017, newly elected Secretary-General of the United Nations António Guterres made clear reference to the fact that a temple once stood on the Temple Mount, and positively asserted its destruction during the siege of Jerusalem in 70 CE during a speech commemorating International Holocaust Remembrance Day, and in subsequent remarks, including an interview on Israel Radio. High-ranking PLO and Palestinian government officials demanded that Guterres recant this claim and submit an apology to the Palestinian people. In response, Guterres instead directly affirmed the existence of a Holy Temple on the Temple Mount, and was condemned by the Palestine National Authority for violating, "all legal, diplomatic and humanitarian customs", and chastised Guterres for overstepping his role as secretary-general.

=== Governments ===
Prime Minister Jean Castex of France read a speech on behalf of President Emmanuel Macron to the Representative Council of Jewish Institutions in France (CRIF) and said "I am concerned about the United Nations resolution on Jerusalem which continues to deliberately and against all evidence remove Jewish terminology from the Temple Mount. You know my attachment to Jerusalem, where I went several times as President or before becoming one. Jerusalem is the eternal capital of the Jewish people, I have never stopped saying that. This in no way precludes recognizing and respecting the attachment of other religions to this city, and it is in this spirit that I myself walked through the Old City in 2020 and visited each of the Holy Places".

=== Other Islamic figures ===
Many Islamic scholars oppose Temple denialism. Imam Abdul Hadi Palazzi, leader of the Italian Muslim Assembly and a co-founder and a co-chairman of the Islam-Israel Fellowship, quotes the Quran to support Judaism's special connection to the Temple Mount. According to Palazzi, "[t]he most authoritative Islamic sources affirm the Temples". He adds that Jerusalem is sacred to Muslims because of its prior holiness to Jews and its standing as home to the biblical prophets and kings David and Solomon, all of whom he says are sacred figures also in Islam. He claims that the Quran "expressly recognizes that Jerusalem plays the same role for Jews that Mecca has for Muslims". Furthermore, both classical Islamic literature and Muslims' scripture recognize the existence of the Temple – albeit as the "Farthest Mosque" rather than Beyt al-Maqdis – and its importance to Judaism.

== See also ==
- Antonia Fortress
- Ayodhya dispute
- Biblical criticism
- Criticism of the Bible
- Ernest L. Martin
- Historicity of the Bible
- Islamization of the Temple Mount
- Khazar myth
- Nuba inscription
- October 7 denial
- Quds Day
