= Archaeological remnants of the Jerusalem Temple =

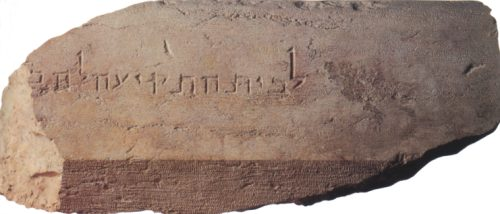
The Trumpeting Place inscription, a stone (2.43×1 m) with Hebrew writing "To the Trumpeting Place" uncovered during archaeological excavations by Benjamin Mazar at the southern foot of the Temple Mount once marked the place where a priest stood to blow a trumpet ushering in the Sabbath in the Herodian period.

Several kinds of archaeological remnants of the Jerusalem Temple exist. Those for what is customarily called Solomon's Temple are indirect and some are challenged. There is extensive physical evidence for the temple called the Second Temple that was built by returning exiles around 516 BCE and stood until its destruction by Rome in the year 70 CE. There is limited physical evidence of Solomon's Temple, although it is still widely accepted to have existed.

== First Temple ==
The term First Temple is customarily used to describe the Temple of the pre-exilic period, which is thought to have been destroyed by the Babylonian conquest. It is described in the Bible as having been built by King Solomon and is understood to have been constructed with its Holy of Holies centered on a stone hilltop now known as the Foundation Stone which had been a traditional focus of worship in Jerusalem. Virtually all modern scholars agree that the First Temple existed on the Temple Mount by the time of the Babylonian siege, but there is disagreement among contemporary scholars as to when it was built and who built it.

Because of the religious and political sensitivities involved, no archaeological excavations and only limited surface surveys of the Temple Mount have been conducted since Charles Warren's expedition of 1867–70. As such, archaeologists continue to remain divided over the existence of the Temple. Kathleen Kenyon claimed that there was no archaeological evidence for the existence of Solomon's Temple, but this view is disputed by Ernest-Marie Laperrousaz. Israel Finkelstein and Neil Asher Silberman argue that the first Jewish temple in Jerusalem was not built until the end of the 7th century BCE, around three hundred years after Solomon. They believe the temple should not really be assigned to Solomon, who they see as little more than a small-time hill country chieftain, and argue that it was most likely built by Josiah, who governed Judah from 639 to 609 BCE. However, Alan R. Millard argues that this minimalist view is essentially a subjective judgement. Philip Alexander argues against the minimalist view based on the detail presented in the written record.

=== Findings ===
- An ostracon (excavated prior to 1981), sometimes referred to as the House of Yahweh ostracon, was discovered at Tel Arad, dated to 6th century BCE which mentions a temple which is probably the Temple in Jerusalem.
- In 2006, the Temple Mount Sifting Project had recovered numerous artifacts dating from the 8th to 7th centuries BCE from soil removed in 1999 by the Islamic Religious Trust (Waqf) from the Solomon's Stables area of the Temple Mount. These include stone weights for weighing silver and a First Temple period bulla, or seal impression, containing ancient Hebrew writing which includes the name Netanyahu ben Yaush. Netanyahu is a name mentioned several times in the Book of Jeremiah while the name Yaush appears in the Lachish letters. However, the combination of names was unknown to scholars.
- In 2007, artifacts dating to the 8th to 6th centuries BCE were described as being possibly the first physical evidence of human activity at the Temple Mount during the First Temple period. The findings included animal bones; ceramic bowl rims, bases, and body sherds; the base of a juglet used to pour oil; the handle of a small juglet; and the rim of a storage jar.

=== Objects believed to be forgeries ===
- A thumb-sized ivory pomegranate (which came to light in 1979) measuring 44 millimetres (1.7 in) in height, and bearing an ancient Hebrew inscription "Sacred donation for the priests in the House of ---h,]", was believed to have adorned a sceptre used by the high priest in Solomon's Temple. It was considered the most important item of biblical antiquities in the Israel Museum's collection. However, in 2004, the Israel Antiquities Authority reported the inscription to be a forgery, though the ivory pomegranate itself was dated to the 14th or 13th century BCE. This was based on the report's claim that three incised letters in the inscription stopped short of an ancient break, as they would have if carved after the ancient break was made. Since then, it has been proven that one of the letters was indeed carved prior to the ancient break, and the status of the other two letters are in question. Some paleographers and others have continued to insist that the inscription is ancient, some dispute this so the authenticity of this writing is still the object of discussion.
- Another artifact, the Jehoash Inscription, which first came to notice in 2003, contains a 15-line description of King Jehoash's ninth-century BCE restoration of the Temple. Its authenticity was called into question by a report by the Israel Antiquities Authority, which said that the surface patina contained microfossils of foraminifera. As these fossils do not dissolve in water, they cannot occur in a calcium carbonate patina, leading initial investigators to conclude that the patina must be an artificial chemical mix applied to the stone by forgers. As of late 2012, the academic community is split on whether the tablet is authentic or not. Commenting on a 2012 report by geologists arguing for the authenticity of the inscription, in October 2012, Hershel Shanks (who believes the inscription is genuine) wrote the current situation was that most Hebrew language scholars believe that the inscription is a forgery and geologists that it is genuine, and thus "Because we rely on experts, and because there is an apparently irresolvable conflict of experts in this case, BAR has taken no position with respect to the authenticity of the Jehoash Inscription."

== Second Temple ==
The term "Second Temple" describes the temple described in the Bible as having been built after the accession of Cyrus the Great to the throne of the Persian Empire in 559 BCE made the re-establishment of the city of Jerusalem and the rebuilding of the Temple possible. The physical evidence for the existence of this Temple is extensive. Consecrated in 516 BCE by the exiles returning from Babylon under Ezra and Nehemiah, it is contained within a far grander edifice. This edifice of the ancient Temple Mount was expanded at least twice more, once under the Hasmonean dynasty and then under Herod the Great, who turned it into one of the largest built structures in the ancient world.

=== Hasmonean expansion ===
The Hasmonean dynasty expanded the 500 cubit square Temple platform toward the south; distinctive Hasmonean ashlars are visible in the Eastern Wall.

=== Herodian expansion ===
The massive Herodian expansion produced the Temple of Jesus' time.

==== Inscriptions ====
The Trumpeting Place inscription and the Temple Warning inscription are surviving pieces of the Herodian expansion of the Temple Mount. Both inscribed stones are on display in the Israel Museum.

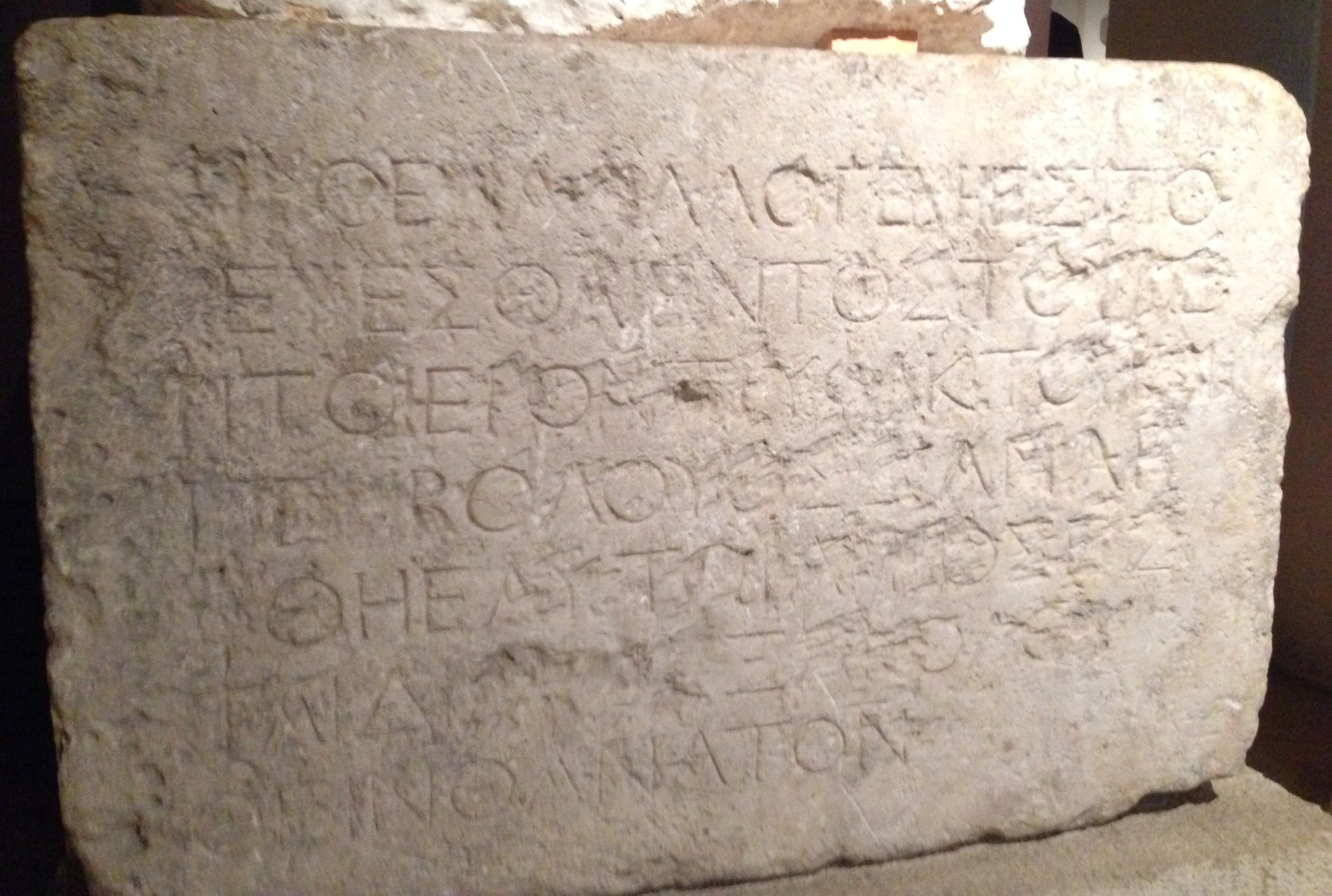
Jerusalem Temple Warning Inscription

During Temple times, entry to the Mount was limited by a complex set of purity laws. Those who were not of the Jewish nation were prohibited from entering the inner court of the Temple. A hewn stone measuring 60 x 90 cm. and engraved with Greek uncials was discovered in 1871 near a court on the Temple Mount in Jerusalem in which it outlined this prohibition:

ΜΗΘΕΝΑΑΛΛΟΓΕΝΗΕΙΣΠΟ
ΡΕΥΕΣΟΑΙΕΝΤΟΣΤΟΥΠΕ
ΡΙΤΟΙΕΡΟΝΤΡΥΦΑΚΤΟΥΚΑΙ
ΠΕΡΙΒΟΛΟΥΟΣΔΑΝΛΗ
ΦΘΗΕΑΥΤΩΙΑΙΤΙΟΣΕΣ
ΤΑΙΔΙΑΤΟΕΞΑΚΟΛΟΥ
ΘΕΙΝΘΑΝΑΤΟΝ

Translation: "Let no foreigner enter within the parapet and the partition which surrounds the Temple precincts. Anyone caught [violating] will be held accountable for his ensuing death." Today, the stone is preserved in Istanbul's Museum of Antiquities.

==== Walls ====
Enormous Herodian lower courses of the massive northern, Eastern, Southern and Western Walls survive.

==== Structures beneath the Temple platform ====
Solomon's Stables is a name given in later centuries to an enormous, underground vaulted support structure erected by Herodian engineers.

==== Paving stones ====
Swaths of Herodian paving survive in situ on the Temple Mount in several places.

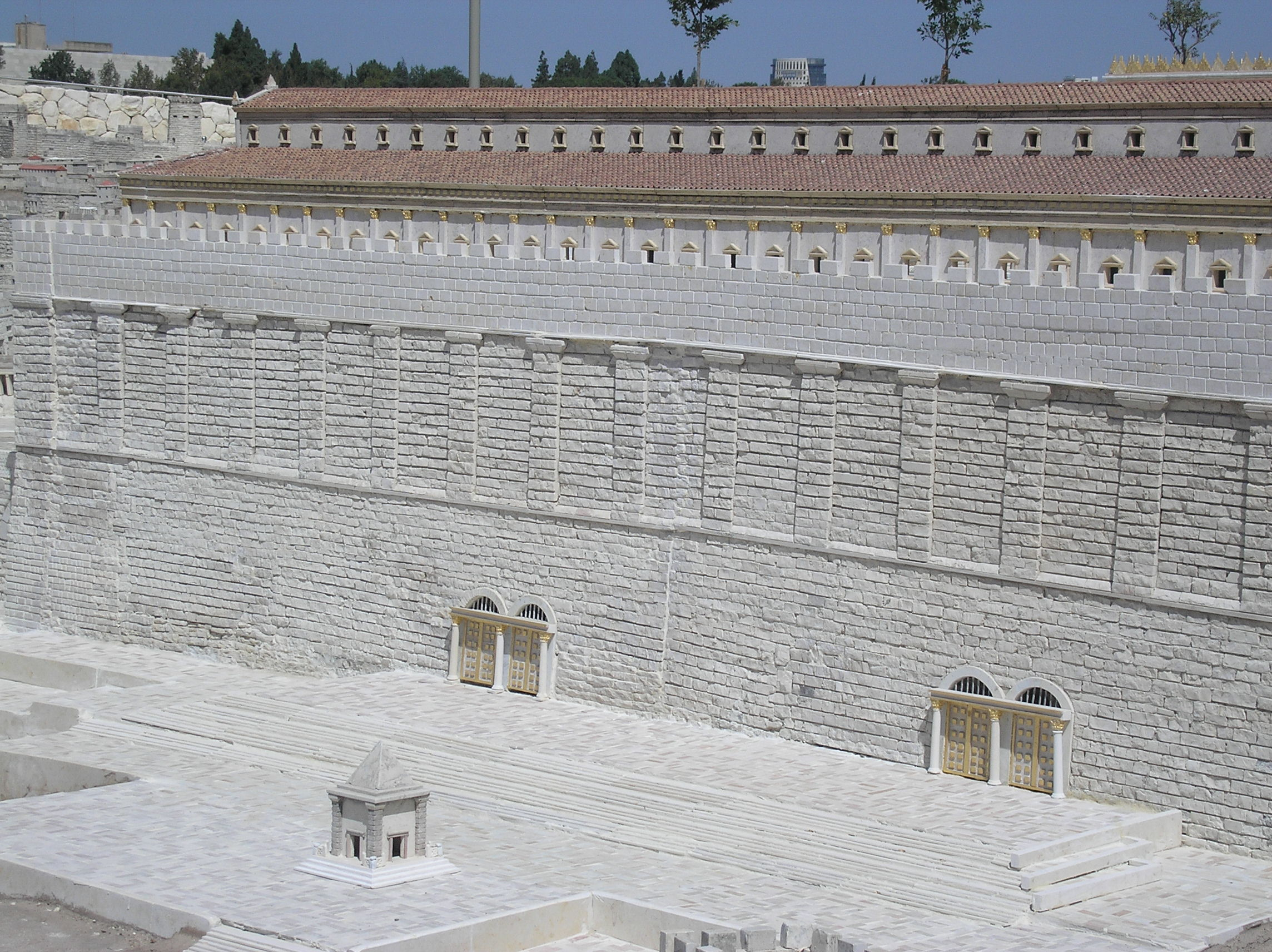
A model of the southern wall and Royal Colonnade or Stoa

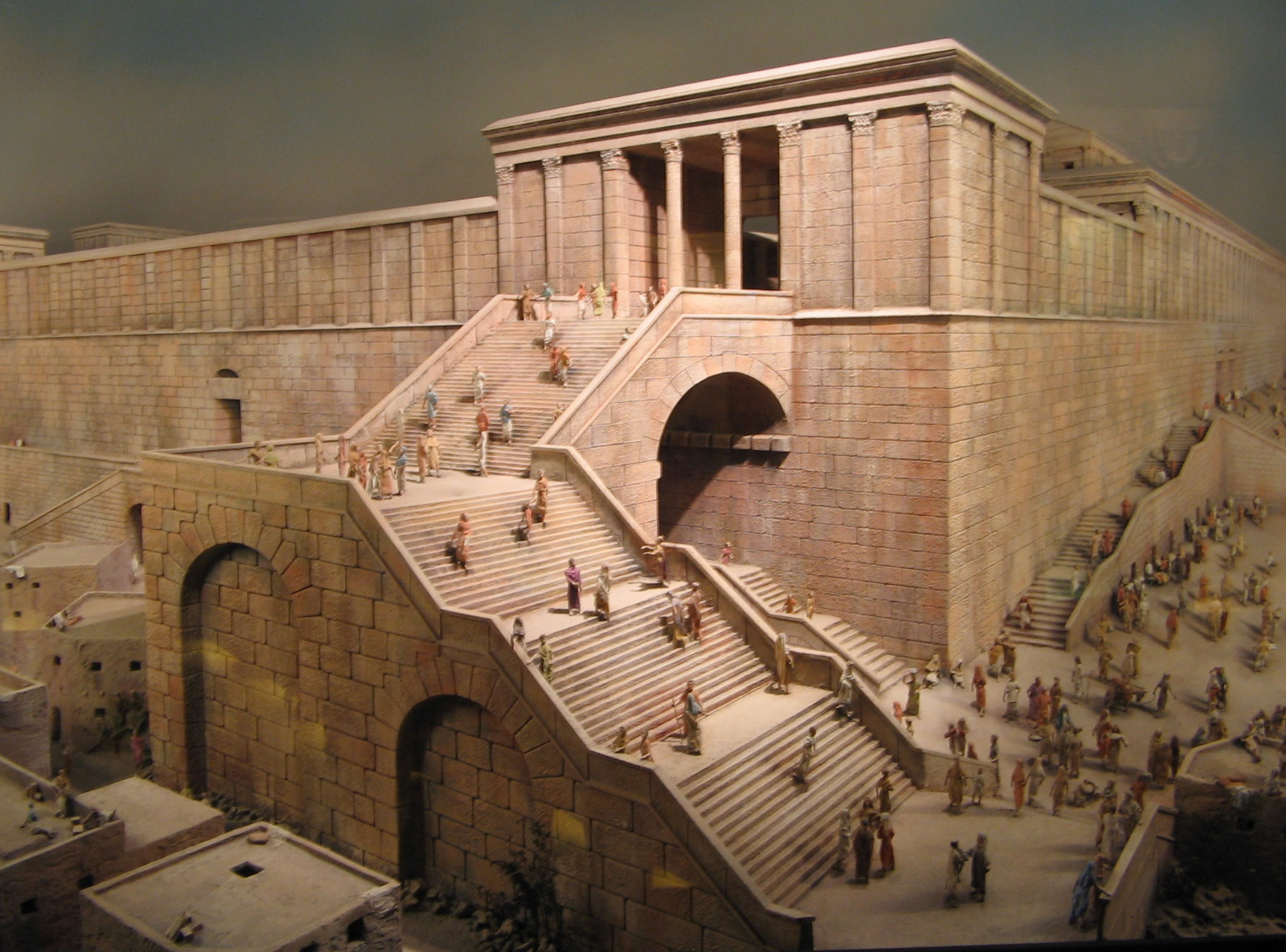
Proposed reconstruction of Robinson's Arch

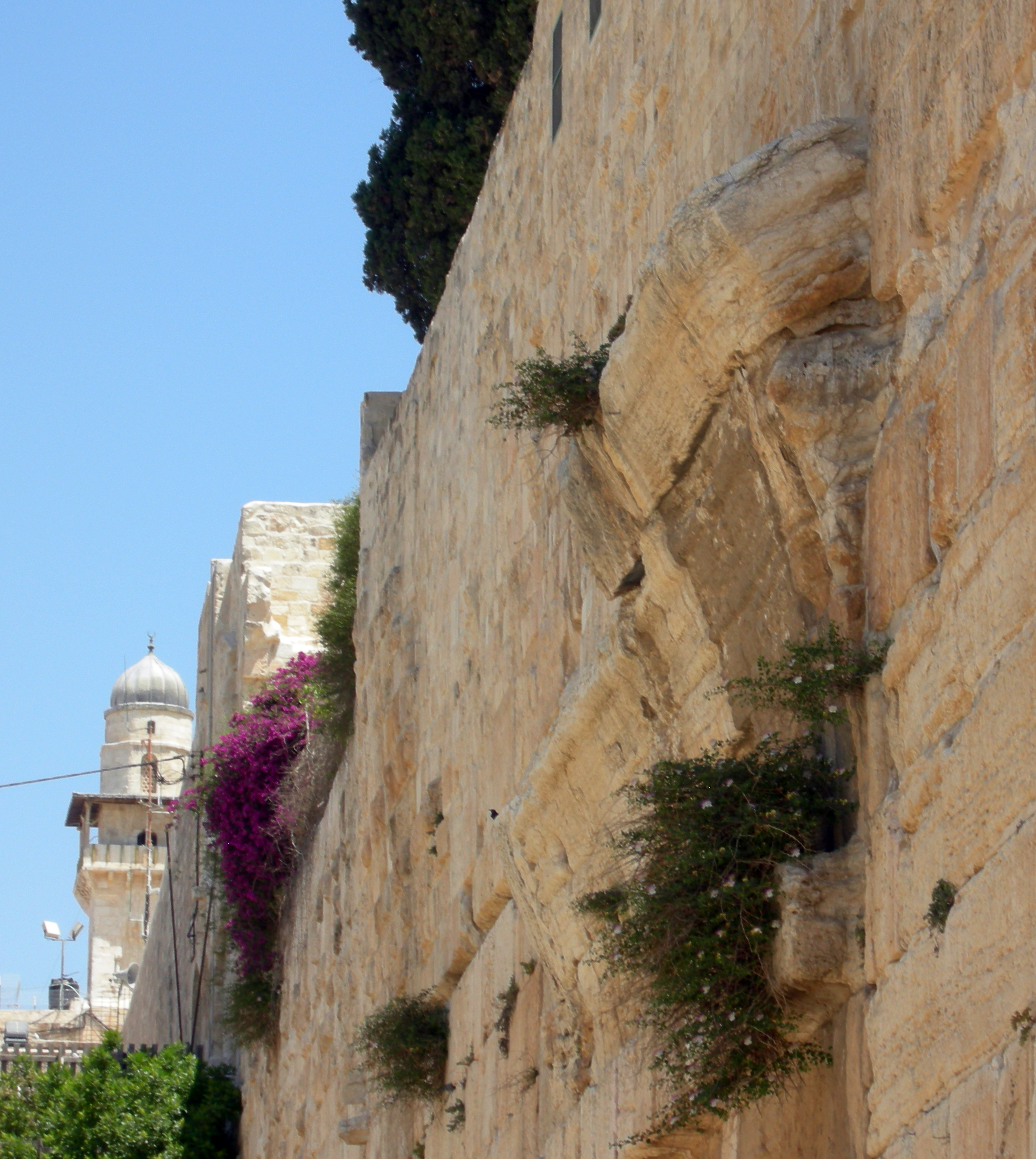
Robinson's Arch – remains of the entrance built by Herod to the Royal Colonnade

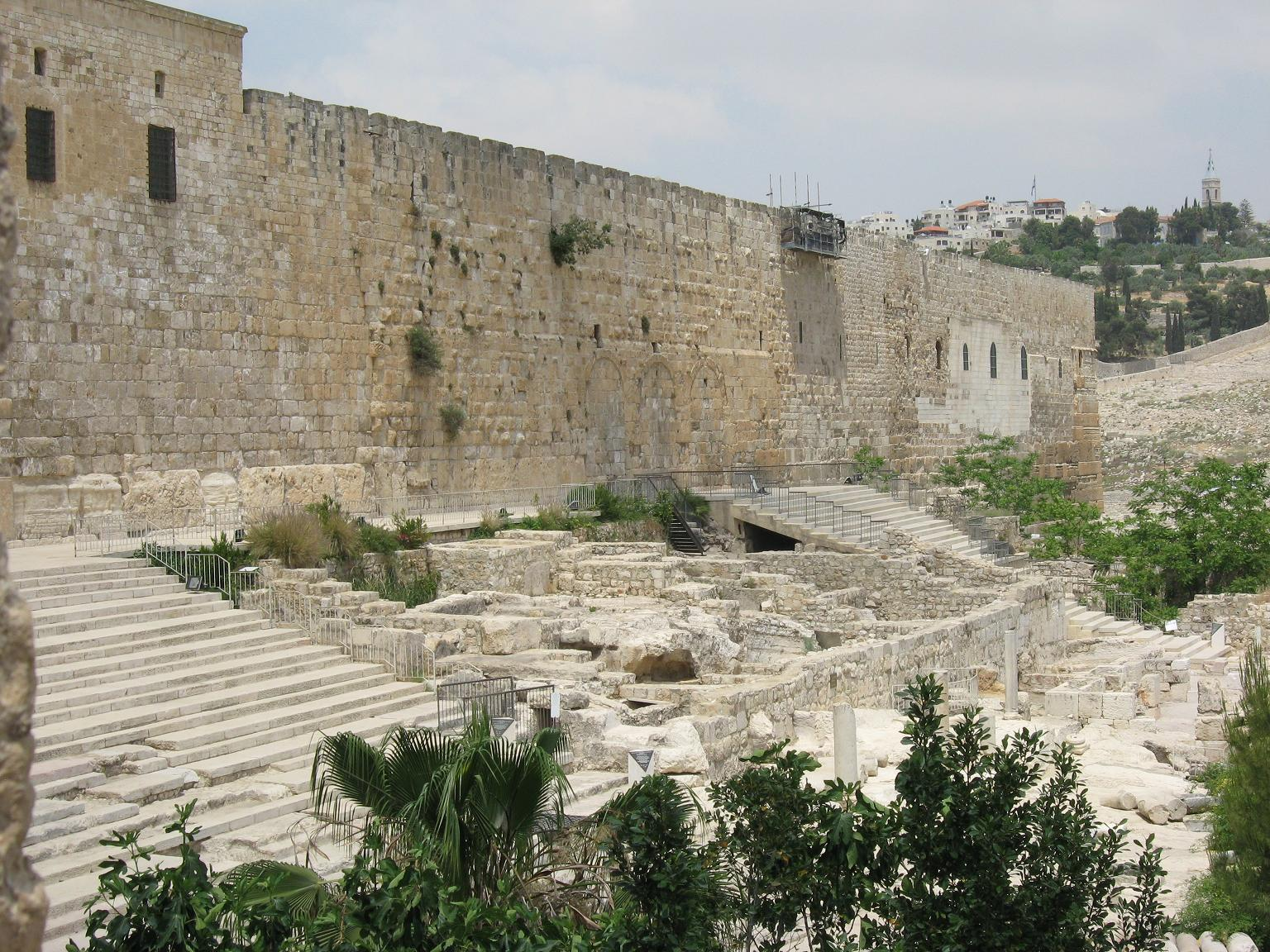
Eastern portion of the southern wall of the Temple Mount

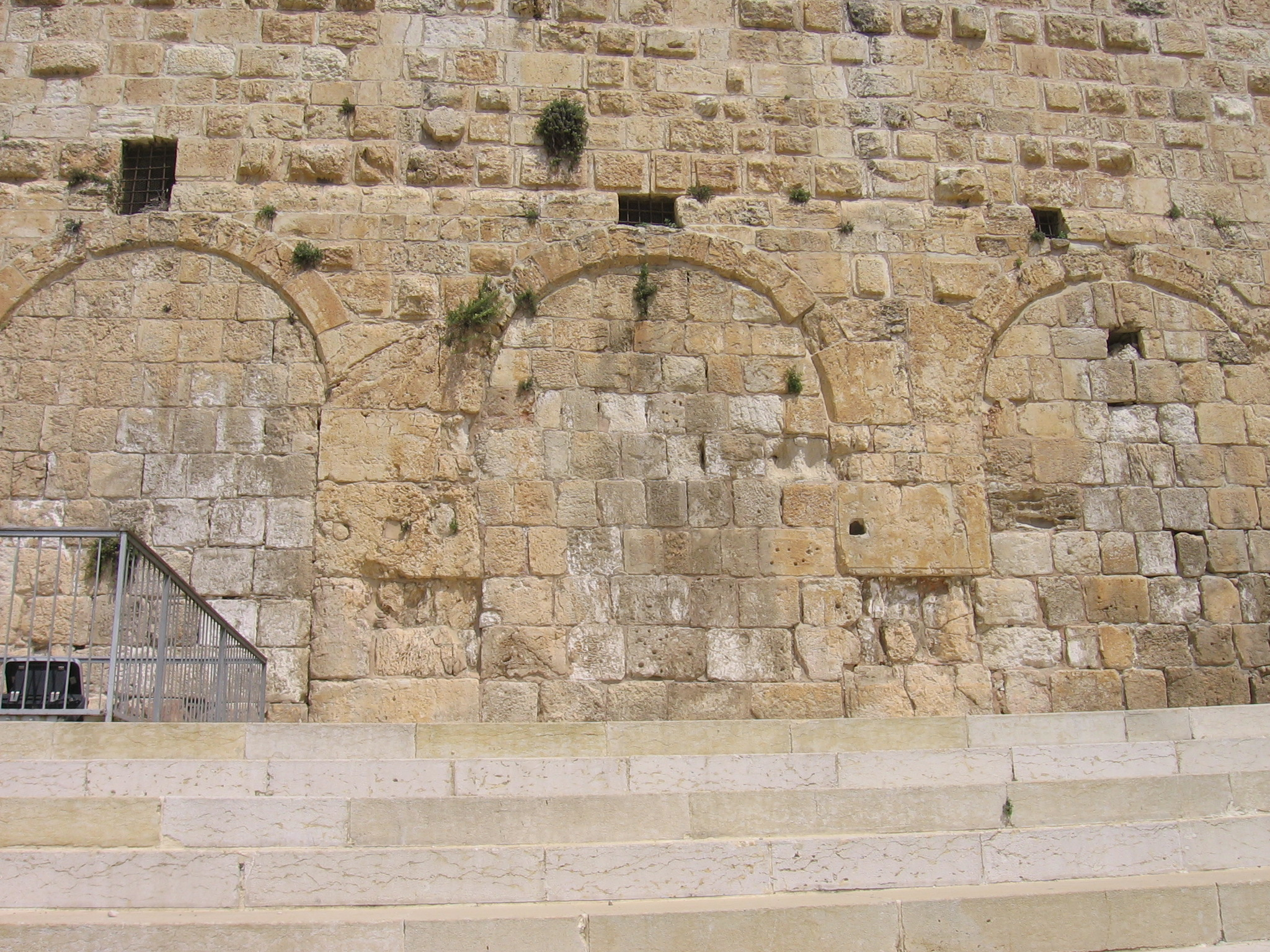
Remains of the Hulda Gates

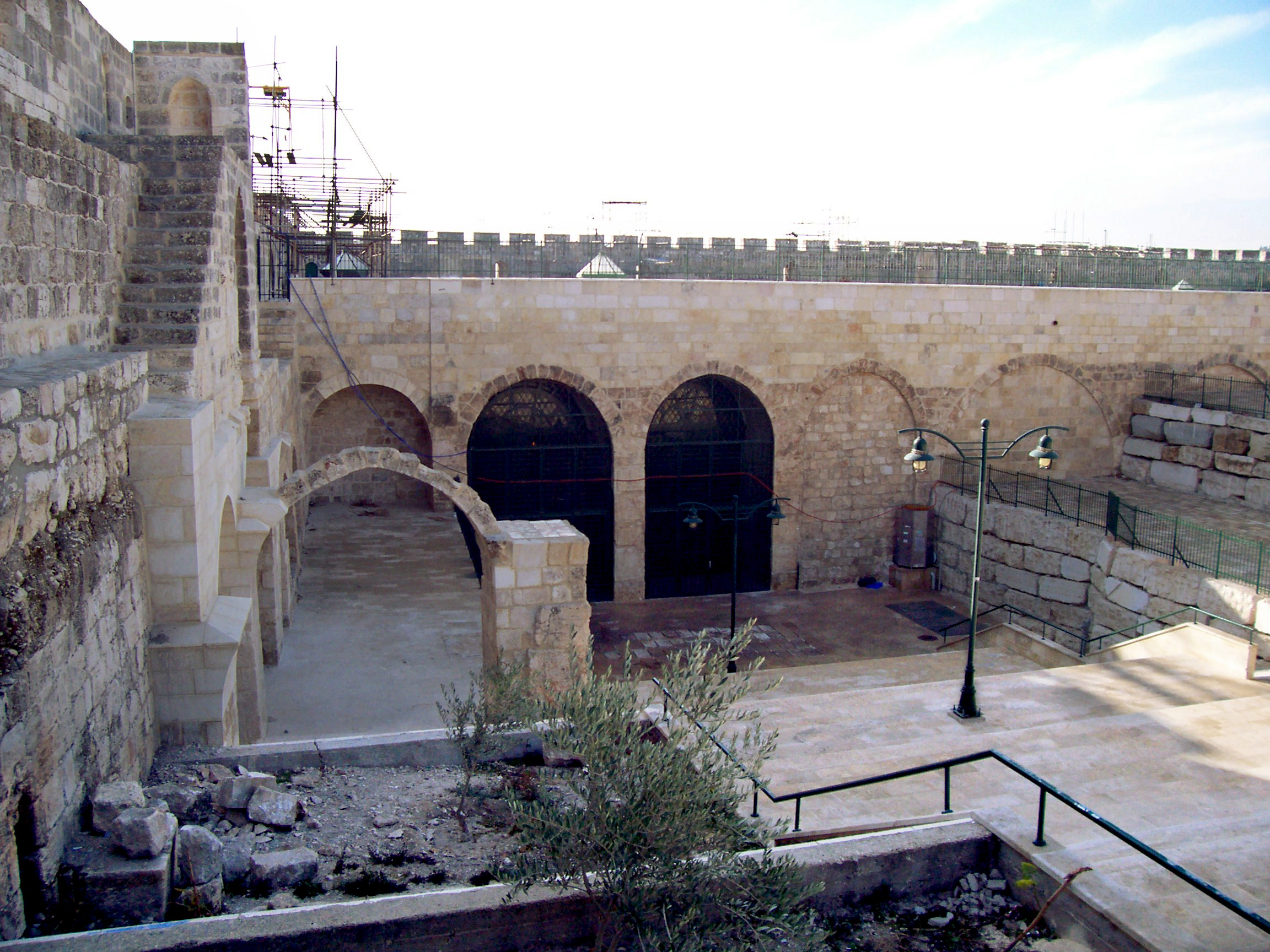
Marwan Mosque on the site of Solomon's Stables

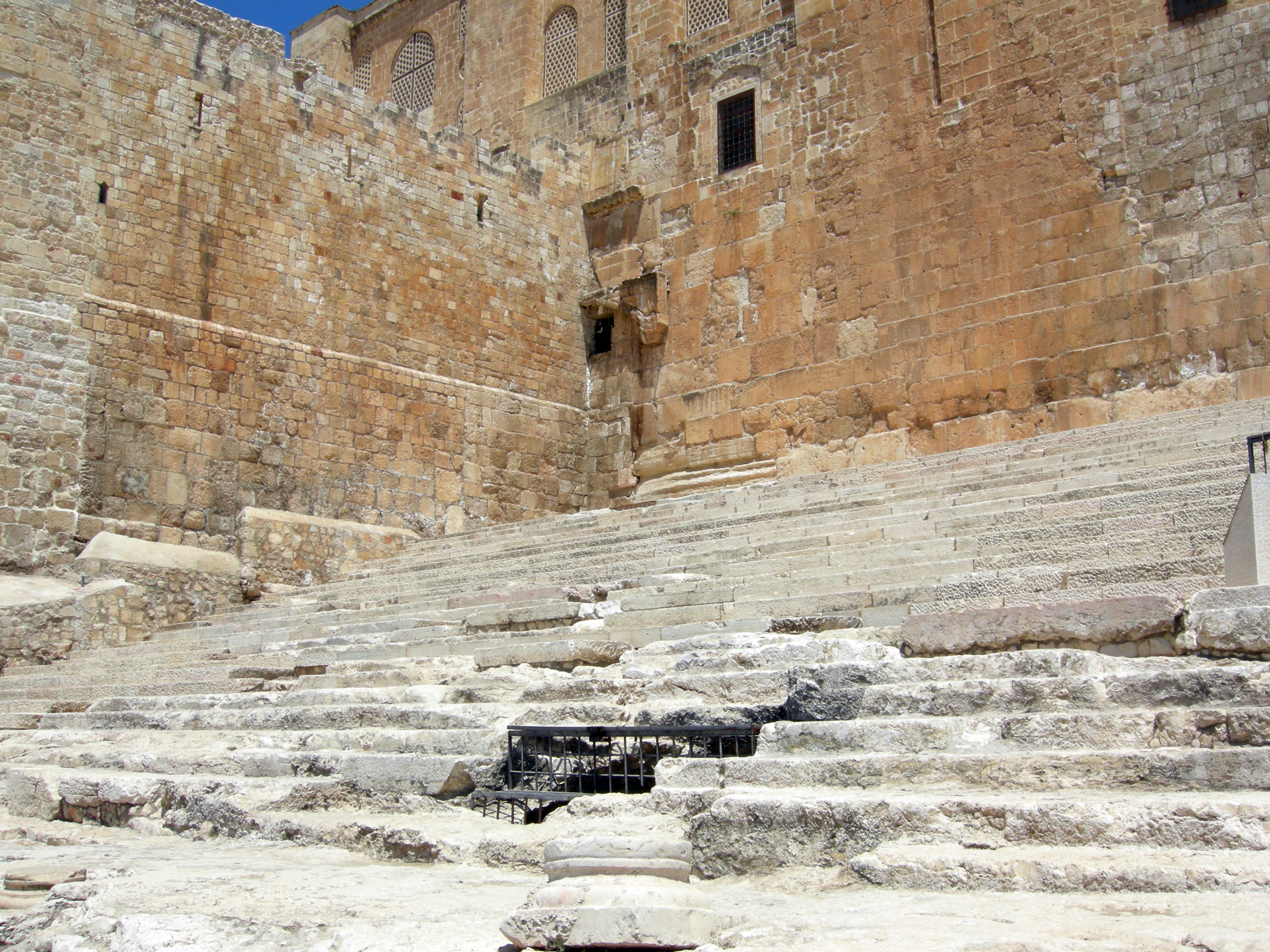
Remnants of the 1st century Stairs of Ascent, discovered by archaeologist Benjamin Mazar, to the entrance of the Temple Courtyard. Pilgrims coming to make sacrifices at the Temple would have entered and exited by this stairway.

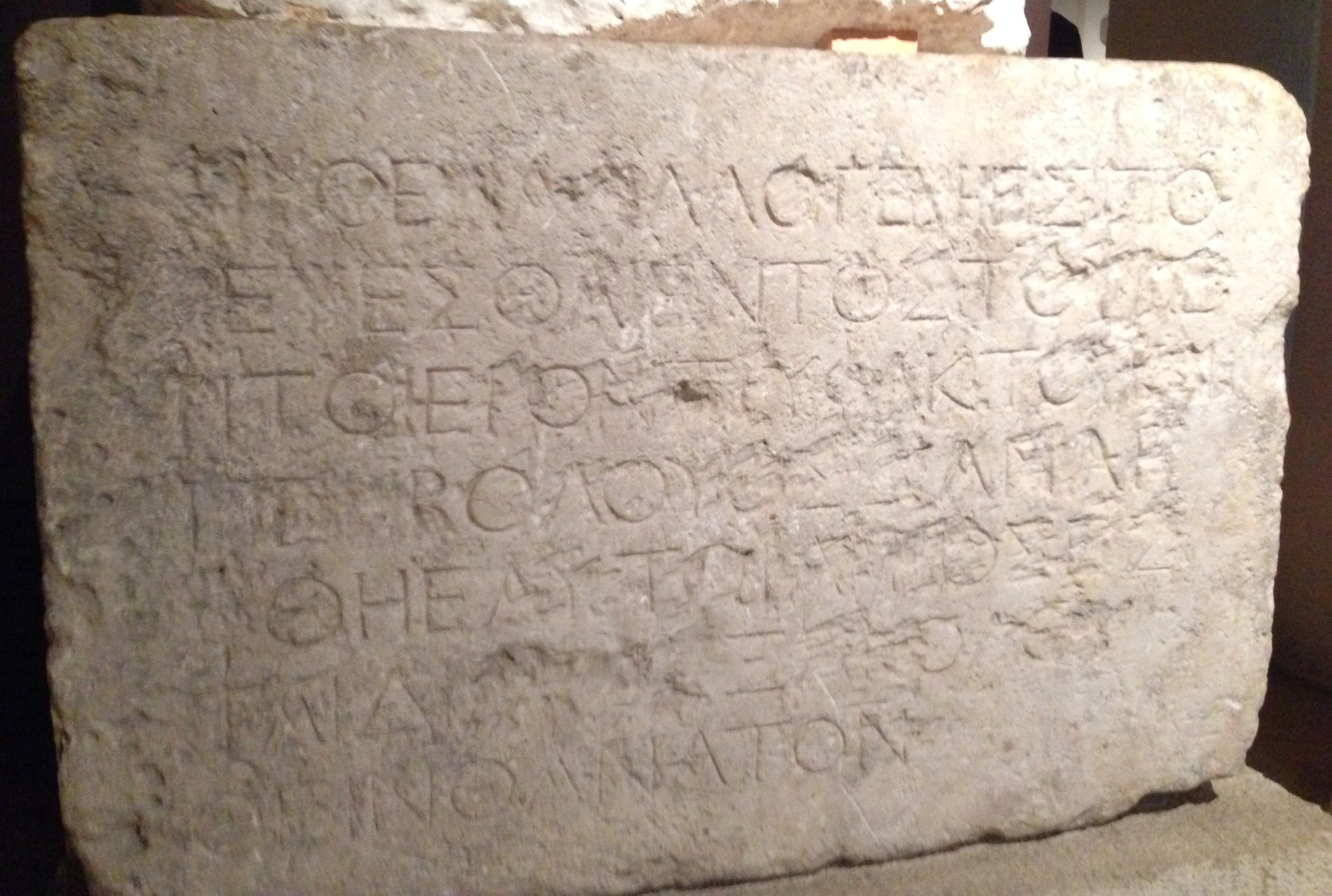
The Warning Inscription found in 1871

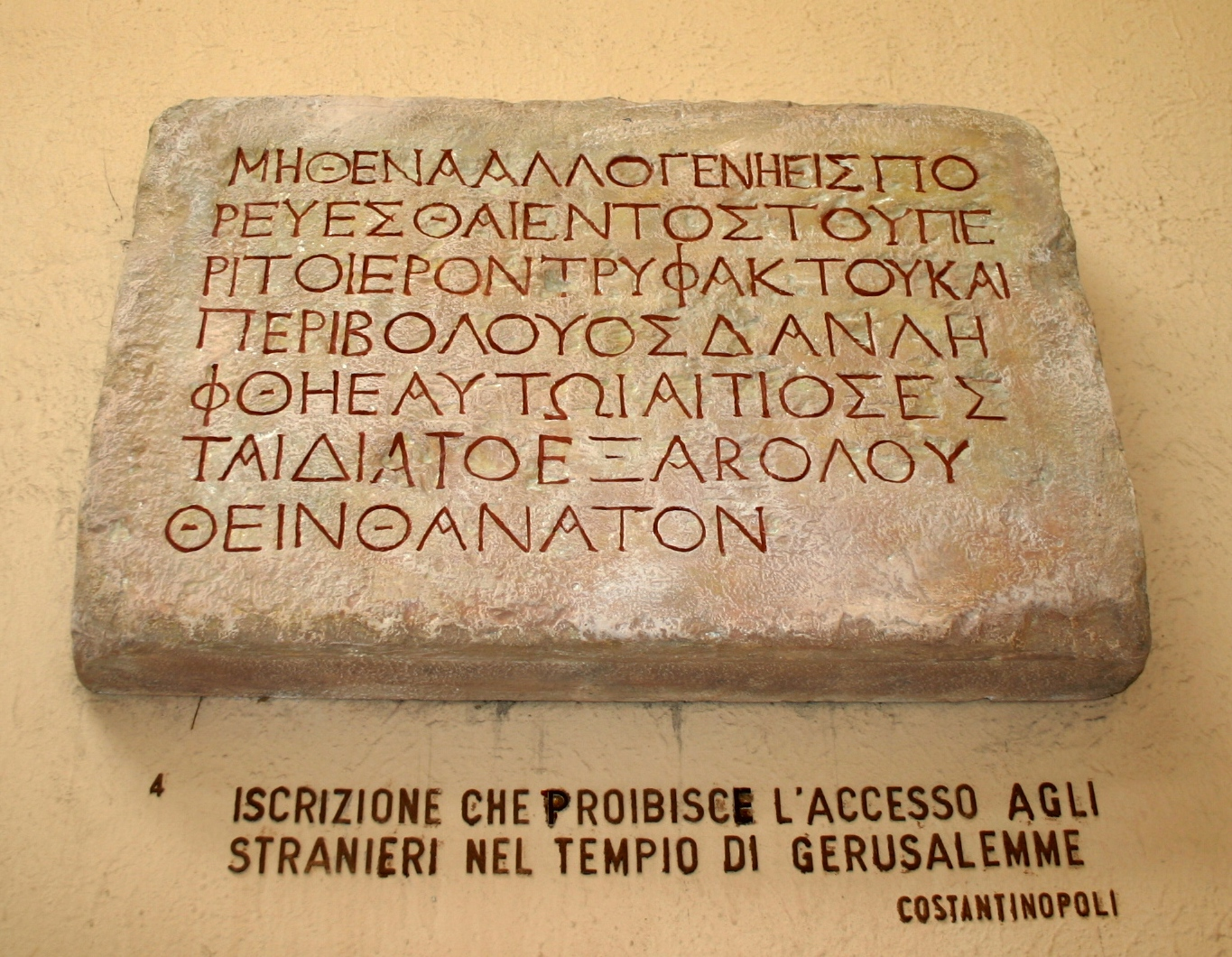
A copy of the inscription found in 1871

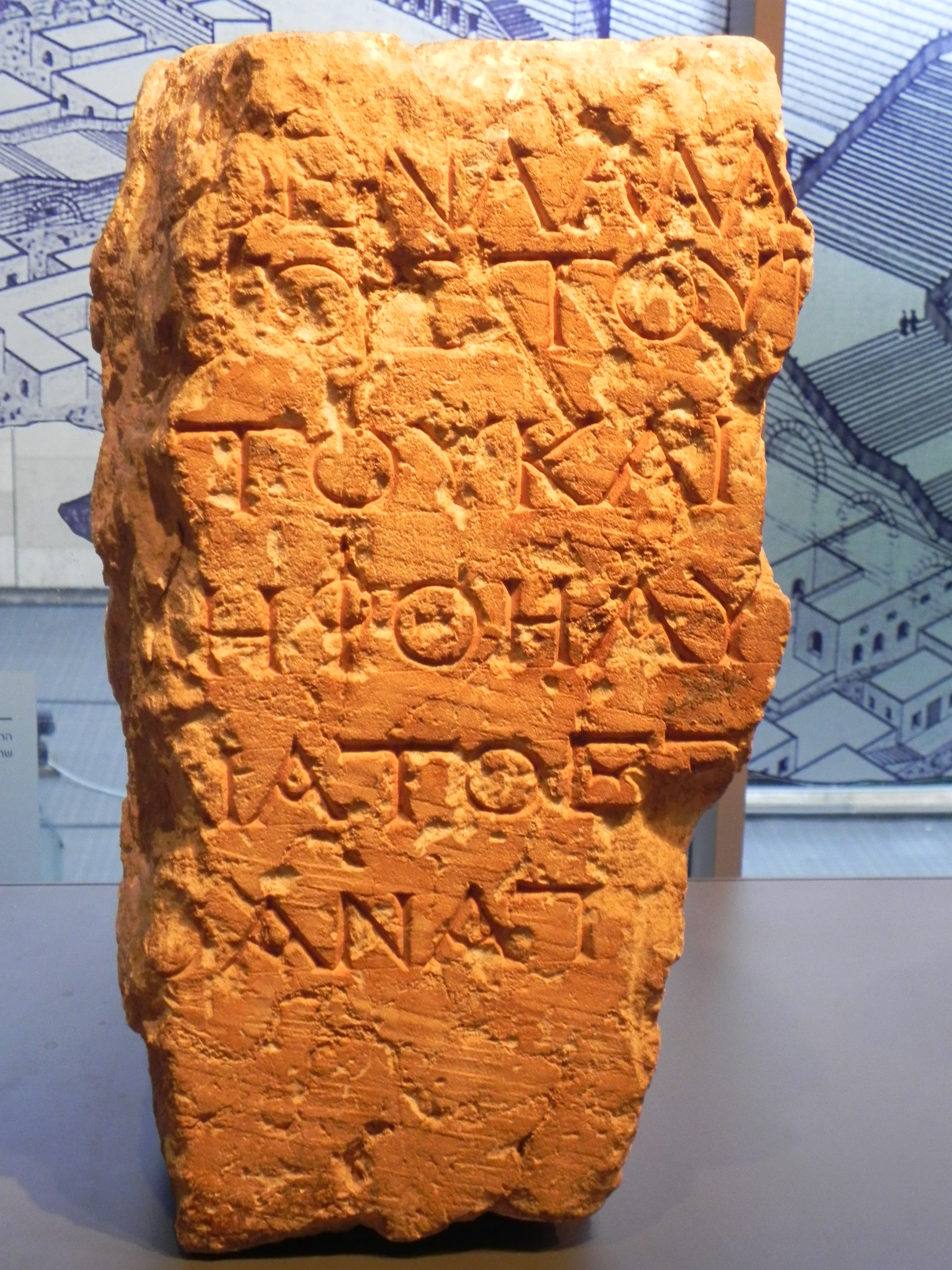
Fragment of Second Temple Warning

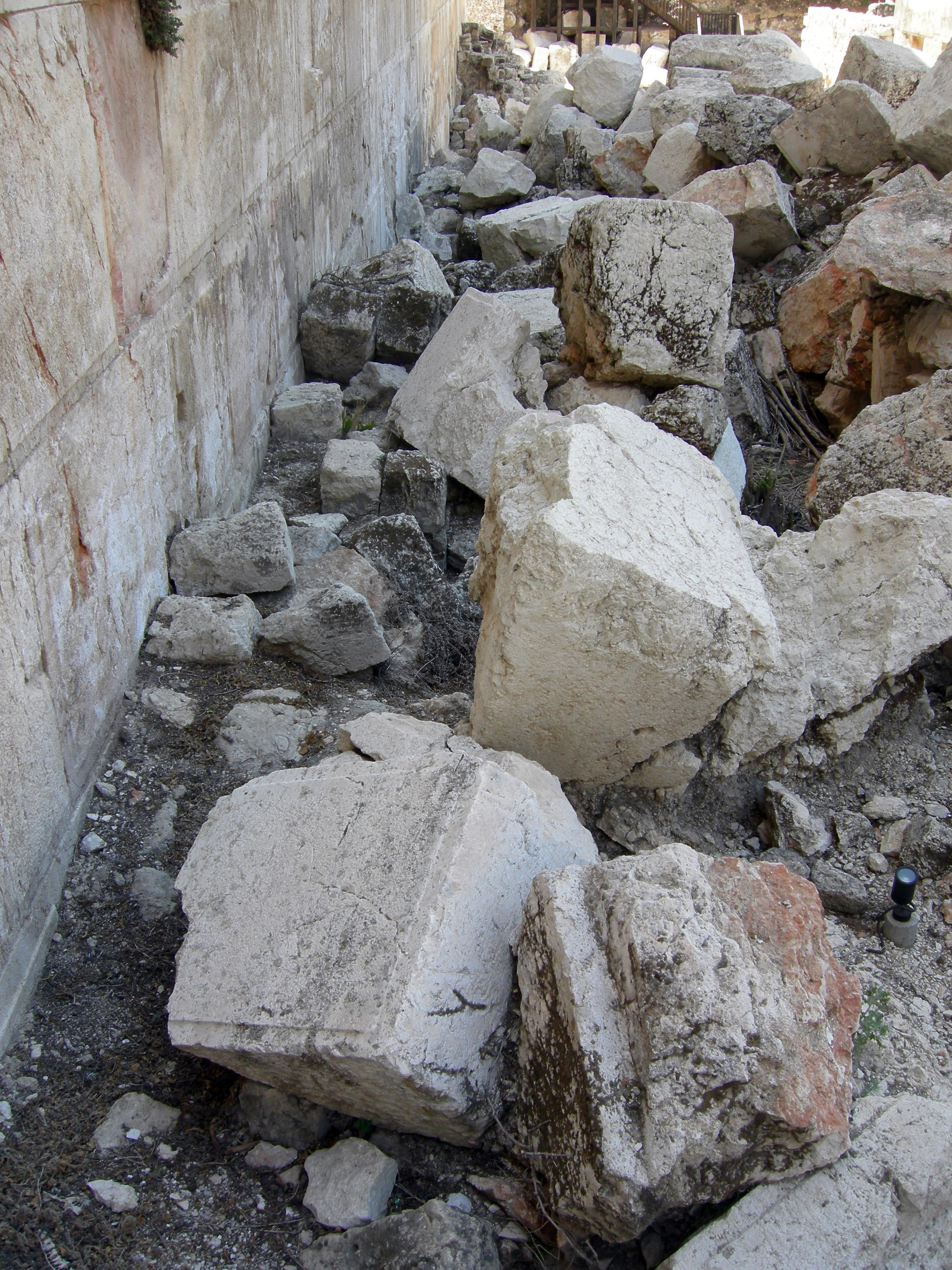
Stones from the Western Wall thrown down by Roman soldiers in 70 CE

== Structures of undetermined antiquity ==
The Well of Souls beneath the Foundation Stone, understood to be extremely ancient, has never been opened to examination by archaeologists by the waqf.

== See also ==
- Stone of Claims
- Tel Motza temple
- Ain Dara temple
