= Theodotos inscription =

Inscription from a synagogue in late Second Temple-era Jerusalem

Theodotus inscription
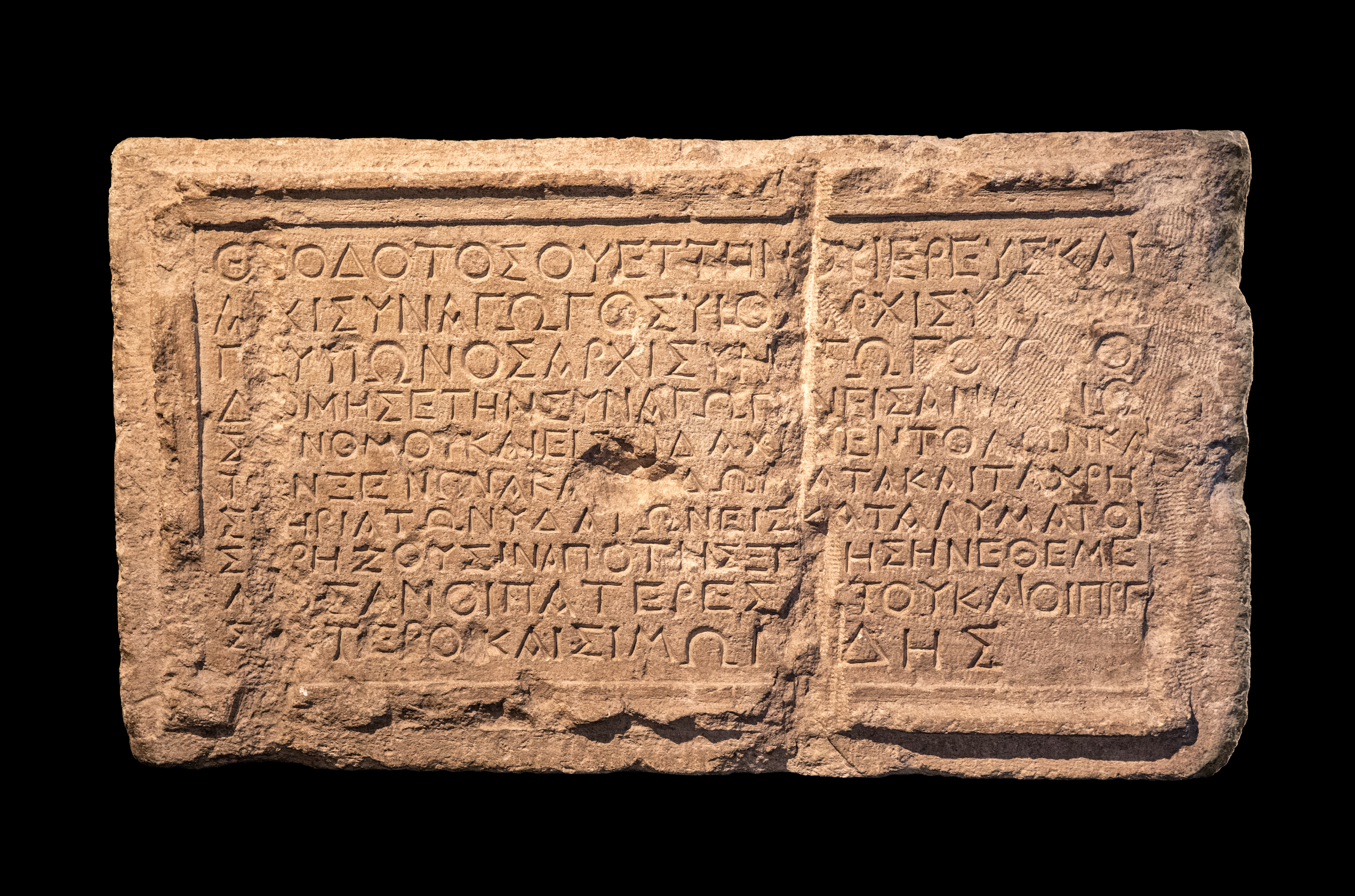
- The Theodotus inscription in its current location
- Type: Synagogue foundation inscription
- Material: Limestone
- Size: 75 cm × 41 cm (30 in × 16 in)
- Writing: Koine Greek
- Created: 1st century BCE–70 CE
- Discovered: 1913
- Discovered by: Raymond Weill
- Place: Ophel, Jerusalem
- Present location: Rockefeller Museum
- Identification: IAA S 842; CIJ II 1404; DF 79
- Period: Herodian or early Roman
- Culture: Judaism (Second Temple)

The Theodotos Inscription is an ancient limestone inscription discovered in Jerusalem, dating to the late Second Temple period. It was found in December 1913 by archaeologist Raymond Weill on what was then known as Mount Ophel. It is now commonly referred to as the City of David (Wadi Hilweh), south of the Temple Mount. The inscription is significant as the earliest known synagogue inscription and the earliest physical evidence for a synagogue in Jerusalem, confirming that such institutions existed there during the Second Temple period and functioned alongside the more ancient Temple cult.

The inscription contains ten lines of Koine Greek text, paleographically dating it to the Herodian or early Roman periods (1st century BCE–70 CE). It commemorates the construction of a synagogue complex by Theodotos, son of Vettenus, who is identified as a priest and a synagogue leader (archisynagogos). The text indicates that Theodotos followed a lineage of leadership, stating that both his father and grandfather had held the same title.

The inscription provides an inventory of the building's specific functions. It states that the structure was built for the "reading of the Law" and the "teaching of the commandments." The complex also included a guesthouse and water installations providing lodging and purification for travellers and pilgrims from the Jewish diaspora.

== Discovery ==
The inscription was discovered during Raymond Weill's 1913–14 excavations in the southeastern Ophel area of ancient Jerusalem, at the archaeological site known as the City of David, south of the Temple Mount. It was found within a large water cistern, designated as "C2," which Weill described as filled with architectural fragments. According to Weill's excavation report, the cavity contained "large discarded wall materials, sometimes deposited in a certain order, enormous rubble stones, numerous cubic blocks with well-cut sides, a few sections of columns: someone filled this hole with the debris of a demolished building". This area later became a quarry for the Roman colony of Aelia Capitolina following its founding on Jerusalem's ruins in the 130s.

Today, the stone is on display at the Rockefeller Archaeological Museum, catalogued under the inventory number IAA S-842.

== Description ==
The inscription is carved into a rectangular limestone ashlar block measuring 75 cm × 41 cm (30 in × 16 in). The text is incised within a recessed area measuring 63 cm × 31 cm (25 in × 12 in). The stone surface exhibits marring, which is generally attributed to the Roman destruction of Jerusalem and the synagogue complex in 70 CE. However, the damage may have resulted from secondary usage.

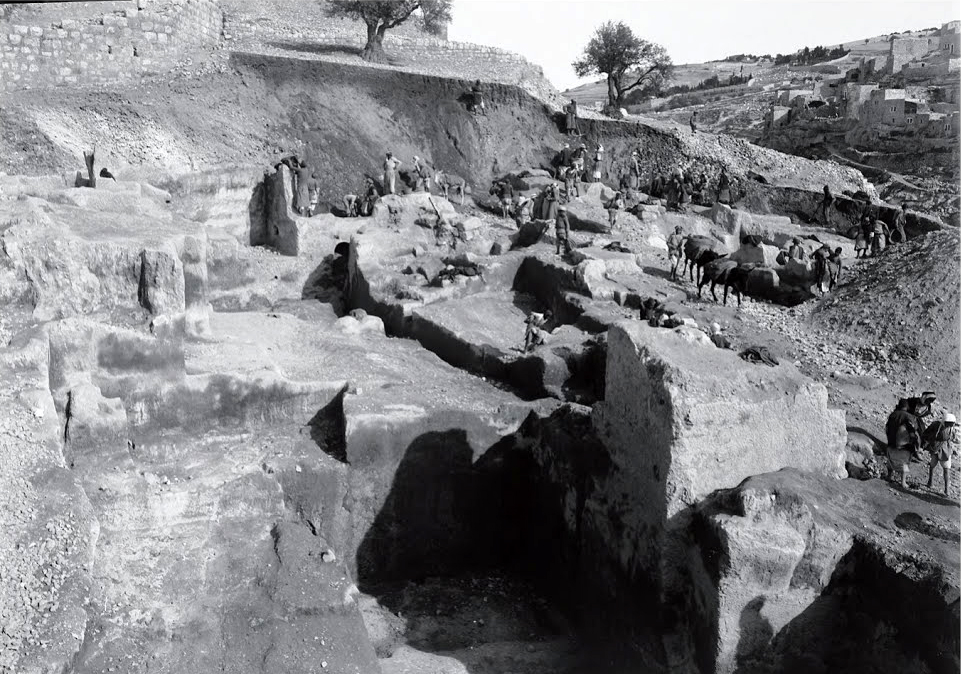
Raymond Weill's excavations, Jerusalem, in 1913

The ten-line Greek text is executed in a square majuscule script. The characters exhibit inconsistent sizing; after the initial rows, the engraver reduced the letter size in lines four through eight, likely to ensure the entire text would fit within the frame, before increasing the scale again toward the inscription's conclusion. In line five, a small iota was later added above another letter, having been initially omitted by mistake.

=== Dating ===
Most scholars date the inscription to the Herodian or early Roman periods (1st century BCE–70 CE). Paleographically, this dating is supported by similarities to several inscriptions from this period in the broader Levant, including two from Jerusalem that date to Herodian times: the Temple Warning inscription (also mentioned by Josephus), and another recording a donation from the Jews of Rhodes for pavement works on the Temple Mount, dated 18/17 BCE. Additional support comes from architectural fragments found inside the cistern alongside the inscription, which closely resemble decorations known from the Herodian Temple Mount.

Two alternative, later datings have been proposed, though they represent a minority view in current research. McKay suggests a 2nd-century date, while McKay argued for a 3rd-century date, maintaining that the term "synagogue" originally referred only to a "gathering" or "congregation" rather than a physical structure until after the 1st century. The latter has been disputed by the scholar of religion John S. Kloppenborg, who points to a 55/56 CE inscription from Berenice (Cyrenaica) that explicitly mentions the repair of a synagogue structure. Kloppenborg also notes that the Ophel, where the inscription was found, was uninhabited after 70 CE and remained so until 460 CE. During the reign of Hadrian (r. 117–138), it was used as a quarry, a fact that virtually precludes the possibility that the structure was erected in the Late Roman period.

== Text ==
=== Greek script ===
1. ΘΕΟΔΟΤΟΣ ΟΥΕΤΤΗΝΟΥ ΙΕΡΕΥΣ ΚΑΙ
2. ΑΡΧΙΣΥΝΑΓΩΓΟΣ ΥΙΟΣ ΑΡΧΙΣΥΝ(ΑΓΩ)
3. Γ(Ο)Υ ΥΙΩΝΟΣ ΑΡΧΙΣΥΝ(Α)ΓΩΓΟΥ ΩΚΟ
4. ΔΟΜΗΣΕ ΤΗΝ ΣΥΝΑΓΩΓ(Η)Ν ΕΙΣ ΑΝ(ΑΓ)ΝΩ
5. Σ(ΙΝ) ΝΟΜΟΥ ΚΑΙ ΕΙΣ (Δ)ΙΔAΧ(Η)Ν ΕΝΤΟΛΩΝ ΚΑ(Ι)
6. ΤΟΝ ΞΕΝΩΝΑ ΚΑ(Ι TΑ) ΔΩΜΑΤΑ ΚΑΙ ΤΑ ΧΡΗ
7. Σ(Τ)ΗΡΙΑ ΤΩΝ ΥΔΑΤΩΝ ΕΙΣ ΚΑΤΑΛΥΜΑ ΤΟΙ
8. Σ(Χ)ΡΗΖΟΥΣΙΝ ΑΠΟ ΤΗΣ ΞΕ(Ν)ΗΣ ΗΝ ΕΘΕΜΕ
9. Λ(ΙΩ)ΣΑΝ ΟΙ ΠΑΤΕΡΕΣ (Α)ΥΤΟΥ ΚΑΙ ΟΙ ΠΡΕ
10. Σ(Β)ΥΤΕΡΟΙ ΚΑΙ ΣΙΜΩΝ(Ι)ΔΗΣ

=== Transliteration ===
Th[e]ódotos Ouettḗnou, hiereùs kaì | a[r]chisynágōgos, yiòs archisyn[agṓ]|g[o]y, yionòs archisyn[a]gṓgou, ōko|dómēse tḕn synagog[ḗ]n eis an[ágn]ō||s[in] nómou kaí eis [d]idach[ḕ]n entolο̂n, kaí t[ò]n xenο̂na, ka[ì tà] dṓmata kaì tà chrē|s[t]ḗria tòn hydátōn eis katályma toî|s [ch]rḗzousin apò tês xé[n]ēs, hḕn etheme|l[íō]san hoi patéres [a]utoù kaí hoi pre||s[b]ýteroi kaì Simon[í]dēs.

=== Translation ===
Theodotos son of Vettenos, priest and archisynágōgos, son of an archisynágōgos, grandson of an archisynágōgos, built the synagogue for the reading of the Law and the teaching of the commandments, as well as the guest-house and the (other) rooms and water installations(?) for the lodging of those who are in need of it from abroad, which (=the synagogue) his forefathers, the elders and Simonides founded.

== Analysis ==
The content of the inscription indicates that it originally adorned a synagogue. The term refers to both the structure and the community. Given the extensive destruction of Jerusalem in 70 CE, the precise original location remains uncertain, as the stone may have been displaced from its primary setting. Nevertheless, the text provides definitive evidence of a synagogue and hospitality complex designed to support Jewish communal life and accommodate pilgrims traveling from the Jewish diaspora. Especially striking is the discovery that the synagogue was used primarily as a center for public reading of the Torah and the study of the commandments, rather than as a place for prayer, since prayer is not mentioned in the text. (Note: The public reading of the Torah and the study of the commandments are also attested in literary sources, including Josephus (in Against Apion), Philo of Alexandria, the Gospel of Luke, Acts of the Apostles, the Mishnah, and the Babylonian Talmud. In particular, it is known that Torah readings were carried out on Rosh Chodesh (New Moon), Shabbat, and feast days.) Margaret Williams notes that "there is no suggestion that Theodotos' foundation was to function as a forum for communal prayer," suggesting instead that "presumably that need was met by the Temple." However, other scholars maintain it remains possible that prayer did take place there.

The inscription reveals a hereditary succession of the archisynágōgos (head of the synagogue), a title that apparently passed from father to son across three generations; the inscription suggests that the position was held with honor. The inscription also provides the earliest securely datable Jewish attestation of the title archisynágōgos, predating other Jewish references by about half a century. Theodotos is also identified as a priest (hiereùs), suggesting he may have concurrently served in the Temple. While the name Theodotos is Greek (paralleling Hebrew names such as Yehonatan and Netan'el), his father's name, Vettenus, is a Latin nomen gentilicium (middle name). The name Vettenus, combined with the use of the Greek language and the provision of a hostel for those "from abroad," suggests the family may have immigrated to Jerusalem from a Diaspora community (possibly from Italy, and perhaps specifically Rome), though this remains uncertain.

The inscription differentiates between the construction of the site by Theodotos and its founding by "his forefathers, ..., the elders and Simonides." It is possible that Simonides was a prominent individual, perhaps the main benefactor, while the inclusion of "the elders" (possibly entrepreneurs or donors) indicates that this was a community project rather than a private family endeavour. Some scholars suggest this implies that the elders and Simonides inaugurated the synagogue, which Theodotos later built. Alternatively, Simonides, the elders, and Theodotos's forefathers may have established the congregation itself (perhaps while still in the Diaspora), for which Theodotos eventually constructed the synagogal complex in Jerusalem.

Beyond the synagogue itself, the inscription records the construction of a xenο̂na (hostel) and chrē|s[t]ḗria (water fittings). The latter can be identified as miqva'ot (ritual baths), a theory supported by the discovery of two such installations within meters of the inscription's find-spot. Nevertheless, the word may also refer to simple cisterns or other water basins used for the needs of the guests.

== Significance ==
The significance of the Theodotos Inscription lies in its status as the only archaeological artifact from Jerusalem that directly attests to the existence of a synagogue within the city during the Second Temple period, in parallel to the Second Temple itself. Beyond this epigraphic evidence, knowledge of Jerusalem’s synagogues during this era is derived primarily from literary sources, such as the New Testament and rabbinic literature. (Note: See for example Acts of the Apostles 6:9 and 24:12; Jerusalem Talmud, Megillah 3.173d; Babylonian Talmud, Megillah 26a.) Since the inscription's discovery, synagogues dating to the late Second Temple period have been identified at several sites across the southern Levant. Examples include the synagogues at Masada, Herodium, Khirbet Badd 'Isa (in Modi'in Illit), Umm al-'Umdan (in Modi'in-Maccabim-Re'ut), Khirbet Di'ab, two synagogues in Magdala, and the Gamla Synagogue.

According to scholar Margaret Williams, the Theodotos inscription "constitutes the earliest inscriptional evidence for the synagogue in Judaea." As noted by scholar Rachel Hachlili, the artifact is also significant for being "one of the earliest dedicatory inscriptions discovered in the Land of Israel."

== See also ==
- Jerusalem during the Second Temple period
- Synagogue of the Libertines
- Temple Warning inscription
- Trumpeting Place inscription

== Bibliography ==
=== Secondary sources ===
- Adler, Yonatan (2022). "The Synagogue". The Origins of Judaism. The Anchor Yale Bible Reference Library. Yale University Press. pp. 170–188. ISBN 978-0300254907.
- Hachlili, Rachel (2013). Ancient Synagogues – Archaeology and Art: New Discoveries and Current Research. Handbook of Oriental Studies, Section 1: Ancient Near East. Vol. 105. Leiden: Brill. pp. 523–526.
- Kloppenborg, John S. (2000). "Dating Theodotus (CIJ II 1404)". Journal of Jewish Studies. 51: 243–280.
- Price, Jonathan (2011). "Synagogue building inscription of Theodotos in Greek, 1 c. BCE–1 c. CE.". In Cotton, Hannah; Di Segni, Leah; Eck, Werner; Isaac, Benjamin (eds.). Volume 1/Part 1 Jerusalem: 1-704. Corpus Inscriptionum Iudaeae/Palaestinae. Berlin: De Gruyter. pp. 53–56.
- Williams, Margaret (1999). "The contribution of Jewish inscriptions to the study of Judaism". In Horbury, William; Davies, W. D.; Sturdy, John (eds.). The Early Roman Period. The Cambridge History of Judaism. Vol. 3. Cambridge University Press. pp. 59–74. ISBN 9781139053662.

=== Primary sources ===
- Weill, Raymond (1920). La Cité de David. Campagne de 1913–1914. Paris: Geuthner.
