= Raymond Weill =

French archaeologist

Raymond Weill (28 January 1874 – 13 July 1950), whose full name was Raymond Charles Isaac Weill, was a French archaeologist specialized in Egyptology.

== Biography ==
Born on 28 January 1874 in Elbeuf, 28 January 1874 in Elbeuf began his career in the military before starting a career with Gaston Maspero at the École pratique des hautes études at the age of 30, where he taught from 1928 to 1945.

From 1904 to 1905 he was in an expedition in the Sinai with Flinders Petrie, which influenced the United States' future President Herbert Hoover's later prospecting endeavours for turquoise in the sinai peninsula for the British mining company Bewick, Moreing & Company.

He specialized in the history of Ancient Egypt, specifically the Second Intermediate Period. He published several works on the end of the 12th dynasty and the Hyksos. Towards the end of his life, he came to the conviction that Hyksos had reigned as local kings in the Nile Delta during the late 12th Dynasty.

Weill was one of the first archaeologists to undertake excavations in what was then known as Mount Ophel, and later known as Wadi Hilweh, Jerusalem. Amateur archaeologist Montagu Parker claimed the location was the "ancient City of David" in 1911. Weill was the first professional archaeologist to claim the site was the "City of David" and identify it as the place where David is said to have set up his capital. He died on 13 July 1950 in Paris.

== Works ==
- Recueil des inscriptions égyptiennes du Sinai: bibliographie, texte, traduction et commentaire, précédé de la géographie, de l’histoire et de la bibliographie des établissements égyptiens de la péninsule, 1904
- Des monuments et de l’histoire des 2e et 3e dynasties égyptiennes. .., thesis, 1908;
- La Presqu’île du Sinai: étude de géographie et d’histoire, 1908;
- Les Décrets Royaux de l'Ancien Égyptien … étude sur les décrets royaux trouvés à Koptos … 1910 et 1911. 1912. (Research about Coptos Decrees)
- La fin du Moyen Empire Égyptien: étude sur les monuments et l'histoire de la période comprise entre la 12e et la 18e dynastie. 1918.
- La Cité de David, 1913-1914, Paris: P. Geuthner, 1920 (the research about Wadi Hilweh being City of David)
- Bases, méthodes et resultats de la Chronologie Égyptienne. 1926–1928.
- Le Champ des roseaux et le champ des offrandes dans la religion funéraire et la religion générale, 1936 (Research about Egyptian afterlife Aaru in the context of general religion and funeral religion)
- Douzième Dynastie, royauté de Haute-Égypte et domination Hyksos dans le nord. 1953 (posthumous work) (12th dynasty and Hyksos research)
- Dara: campagnes de 1946-1948, with Madame Tony-Revillon and M. Pillet, 1958

== Bibliography ==
- Morris L. Bierbrier: Who Was Who in Egyptology. 4th revised edition. Egypt Exploration Society, London 2012, ISBN 978-0-85698-207-1, p. 571.
