= Temple Warning inscription =

Ancient Second Temple inscription

Temple Warning Inscription
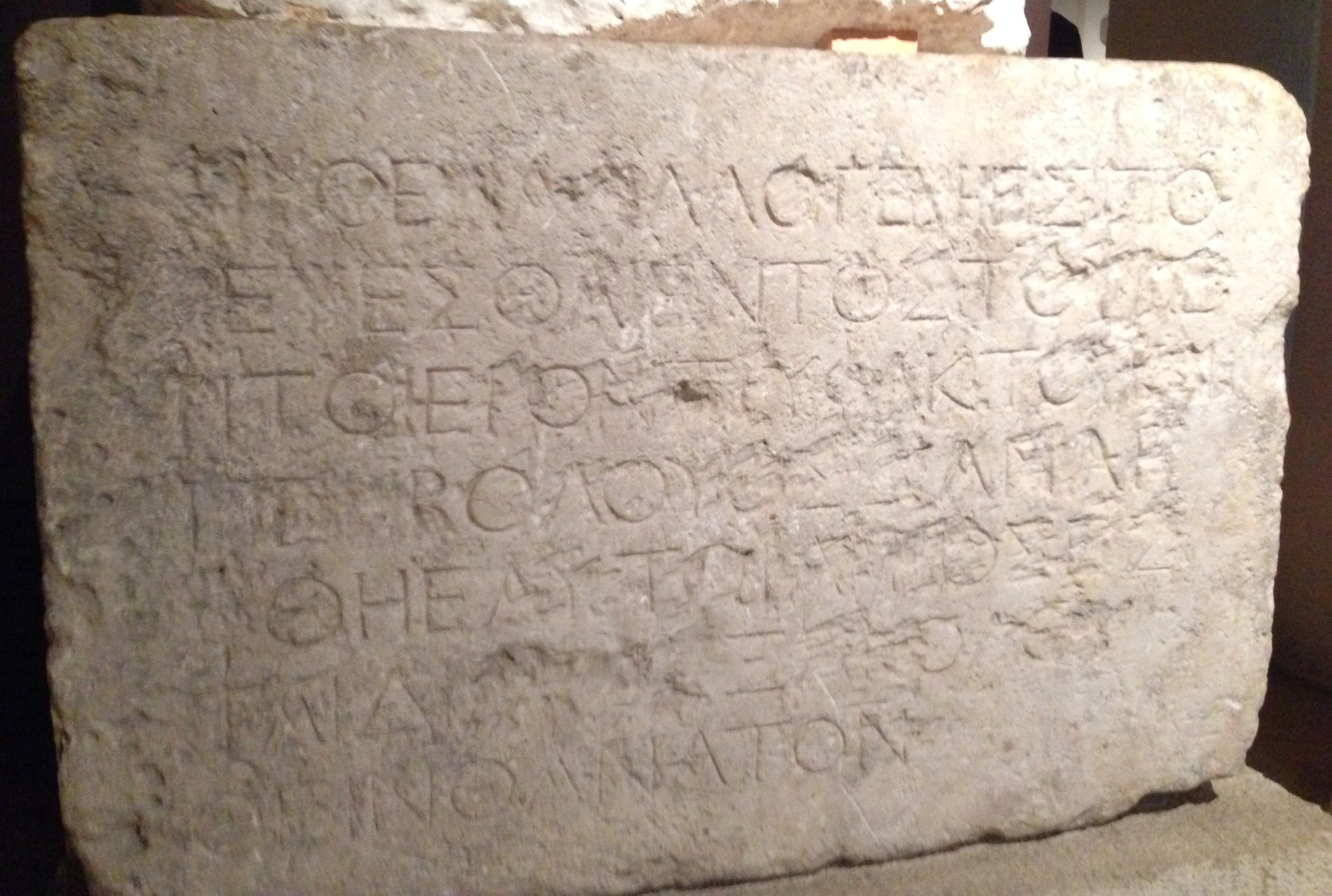
- The inscription in its current location
- Material: Limestone
- Writing: Greek
- Created: c. 23 BCE – 70 CE
- Discovered: 1871
- Present location: Istanbul Archaeology Museums
- Identification: 2196 T

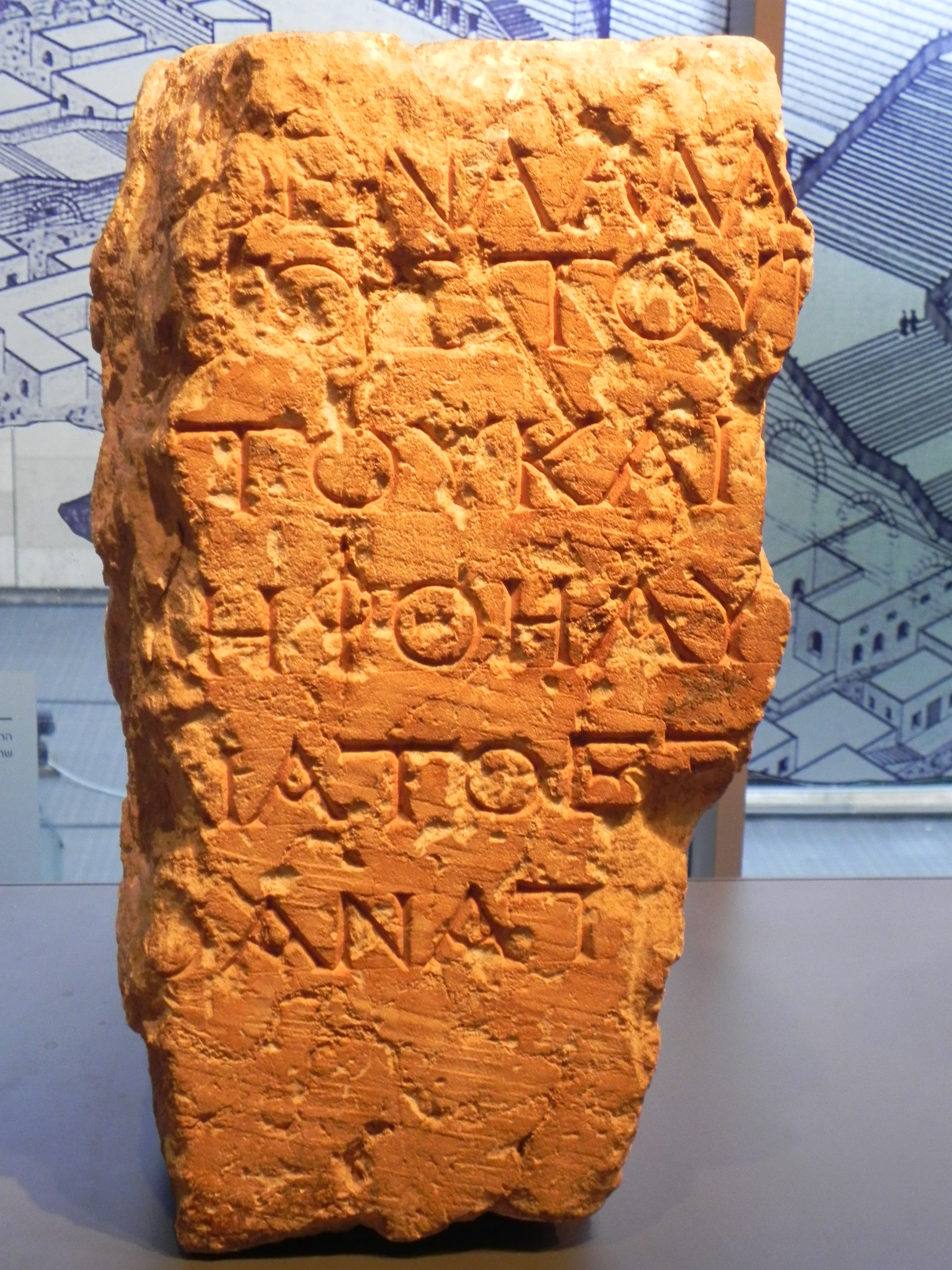
Fragment of the inscription at the Israel Museum.

The Temple Warning inscription, also known as the Temple Balustrade inscription or the Soreg inscription, is an inscription that hung along the balustrade outside the Sanctuary of the Second Temple in Jerusalem. Two of these tablets have been found. The inscription was a warning to pagan visitors to the temple not to proceed further. Both Greek and Latin inscriptions on the temple's balustrade served as warnings to pagan visitors not to proceed under penalty of death.

A complete tablet was discovered in 1871 by Charles Simon Clermont-Ganneau, in the ad-Dawadariya school just outside the al-Atim Gate to the Temple Mount, and published by the Palestine Exploration Fund. Following the discovery of the inscription, it was taken by the Ottoman authorities, and it is currently in the Istanbul Archaeology Museums. A partial fragment of a less well made version of the inscription was found in 1936 by J. H. Iliffe during the excavation of a new road outside Jerusalem's Lions' Gate; it is held in the Israel Museum.

== Inscription ==
Two tablets have been found, one complete, and the other a partial fragment with missing sections, but with letters showing signs of the red paint that had originally highlighted the text. It was described by the Palestine Exploration Fund in 1872 as being "very nearly in the words of Josephus".

The inscription uses three terms referring to temple architecture:

- To hieron (Το ἱερόν), "holy place", the sacred area, to which the forecourt led
- Peribolou (περίβολος), a wall encompassing the holy terrace within the outer court
- Tryphaktou (τρύφακτος), a stone barrier across the outer court

== Translation ==
The tablet bears the following inscription in Koine Greek:

Original Greek	In minuscules with diacritics	Transliteration	Translation
ΜΗΘΕΝΑΑΛΛΟΓΕΝΗΕΙΣΠΟ ΡΕΥΕΣΘΑΙΕΝΤΟΣΤΟΥΠΕ ΡΙΤΟΙΕΡΟΝΤΡΥΦΑΚΤΟΥΚΑΙ ΠΕΡΙΒΟΛΟΥΟΣΔΑΝΛΗ ΦΘΗΕΑΥΤΩΙΑΙΤΙΟΣΕΣ ΤΑΙΔΙΑΤΟΕΞΑΚΟΛΟΥ ΘΕΙΝΘΑΝΑΤΟΝ	Μηθένα ἀλλογενῆ εἰσπορεύεσθαι ἐντὸς τοῦ περὶ τὸ ἱερὸν τρυφάκτου καὶ περιβόλου. Ὃς δ᾽ ἂν ληφθῇ, ἑαυτῷ αἴτιος ἔσται διὰ τὸ ἐξακολουθεῖν θάνατον.	Mēthéna allogenē eispo[-] révesthai entós toú pe [-] rì tò hieròn trypháktou kaì peribólou.[-] Hòs d'àn lē[-] phthē heautōi aítios és[-] tai dià tò exakolou[-] thein thánaton.[-]	No stranger is to enter within the balustrade round the temple and enclosure. Whoever is caught will be himself responsible for his ensuing death.

The identity of the hypothetical stranger/foreigner remains ambiguous. Some scholars believed it referred to all gentiles, regardless of ritual purity status or religion. Others argue that it referred to unconverted Gentiles since Herod wrote the inscription. Herod himself was a converted Idumean (or Edomite) and was unlikely to exclude himself or his descendants.

The partial inscriptions in the stone found in the Lion's Gate correspond with the text found in the previous analyzed complete text, a transcription of the text found in that stone would be the following:

1. ΘΕΝΑ ΑΛΛ
2. ΤΟΣ ΤΟΥ Π
3. ΤΟΥ ΚΑΙ
4. ΗΦΘΗ ΑΥ
5. ΙΑ ΤΟ ΕΞ
6. ΘΑΝΑΤ

Which, when combined with the Al-Atim Gate inscription makes perfect, cohesive sense, making a clear case for both stones having the same message carved onto them (underlined text represents the Lion's Gate stone inscriptions):

1. ΜΗΟΕΝΑΑΛΛΟΓΕΝΗΕΙΣΠΟ
2. ΡΕΥΕΣΟΑΙΕΝΤΟΣΤΟΥΠΕ
3. ΡΙΤΟΙΕΡΟΝΤΡΥΦΑΚΤΟΥΚΑΙ
4. ΠΕΡΙΒΟΛΟΥΟΣΔΑΝΛΗ
5. ΦΘΗΕΑΥΤΩΙΑΙΤΙΟΣΕΣ
6. ΤΑΙΔΙΑΤΟΕΞΑΚΟΛΟΥ
7. ΘΕΙΝΘΑΝΑΤΟΝ

== Forgeries ==
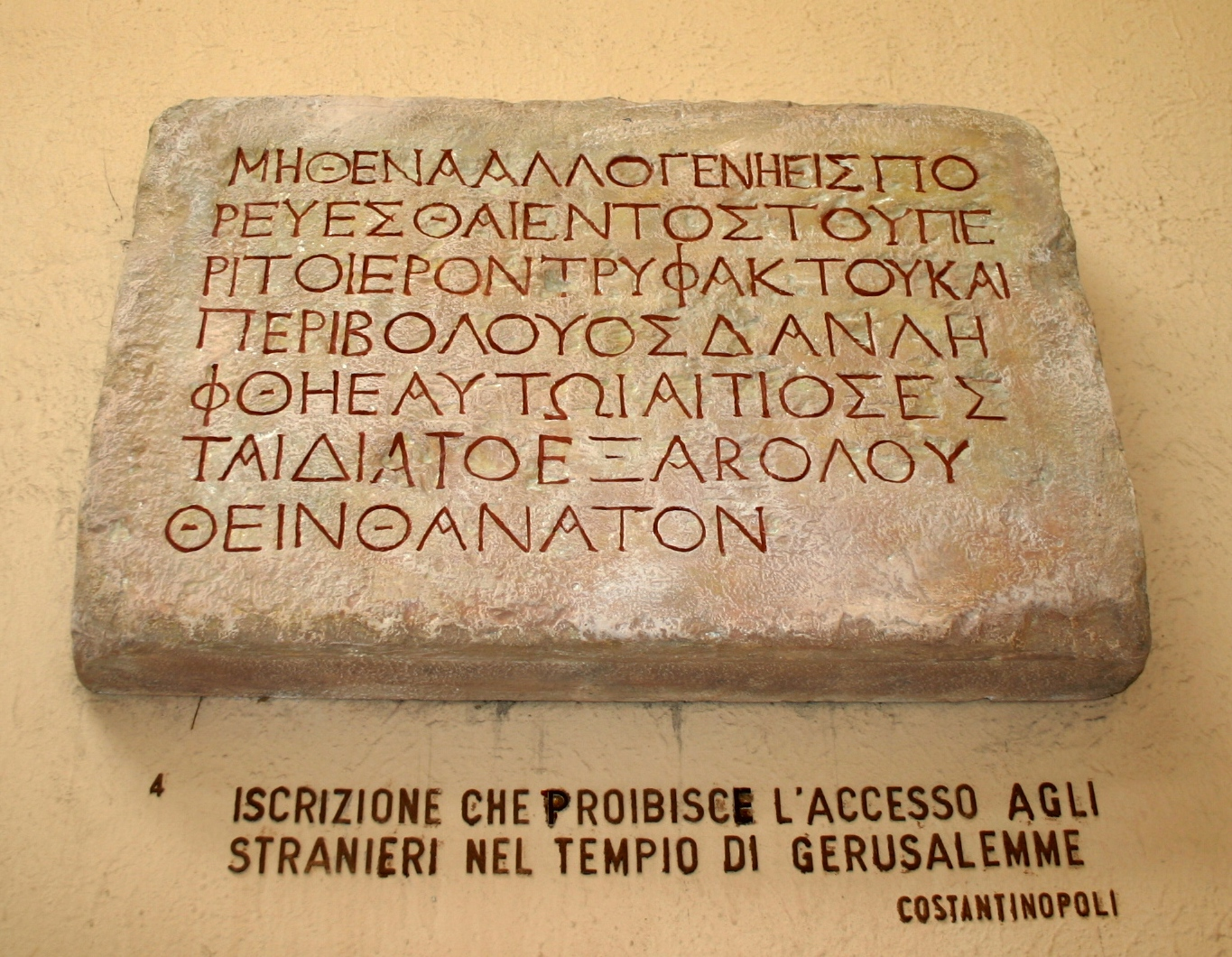
A copy of the inscription at the Museum of Roman Civilization in Rome.

Several forgeries were promptly prepared following the 1871 discovery. Clermont-Ganneau was shown a similar artifact at the Monastery of St Saviour, which was later shown to be a forgery created by Martin Boulos.

== See also ==
- Jerusalem during the Second Temple period
- Acts 21:27–29
- Theodotos inscription
- Trumpeting Place inscription

== External references ==
- Clermont-Ganneau, Charles Simon (30 May 1871). "Discovery of a Tablet from Herod's Temple" (PDF). Palestine Exploration Quarterly. 3 (3): 132–134. doi:10.1179/peq.1871.013. "Google books reference at "
- Dr. Carl Rasmussen. "Holy Land Photos". holylandphotos.org.
- Cotton, H. (2010). CIIP. De Gruyter. p. 42. ISBN 9783110222197.
- Millard, Alan, Discoveries from the Time of Jesus. Oxford: Lion Publishing, 1990.
- Roitman, Aldopho, Envisioning the Temple, Jerusalem: The Israel Museum, 2003.
- Elias J. Bickerman, "The Warning Inscriptions of Herod's Temple," The Jewish Quarterly Review, New Ser., Vol. 37, No. 4. (Apr., 1947), pp. 387–405.
- Matan Orian, "The Purpose of the Balustrade in the Herodian Temple," Journal for the Study of Judaism 51 (2020), pp. 1–38.
