= Nuba inscription =

Early Islamic text

Coordinates: 31°36′22.7″N 35°02′23.1″E

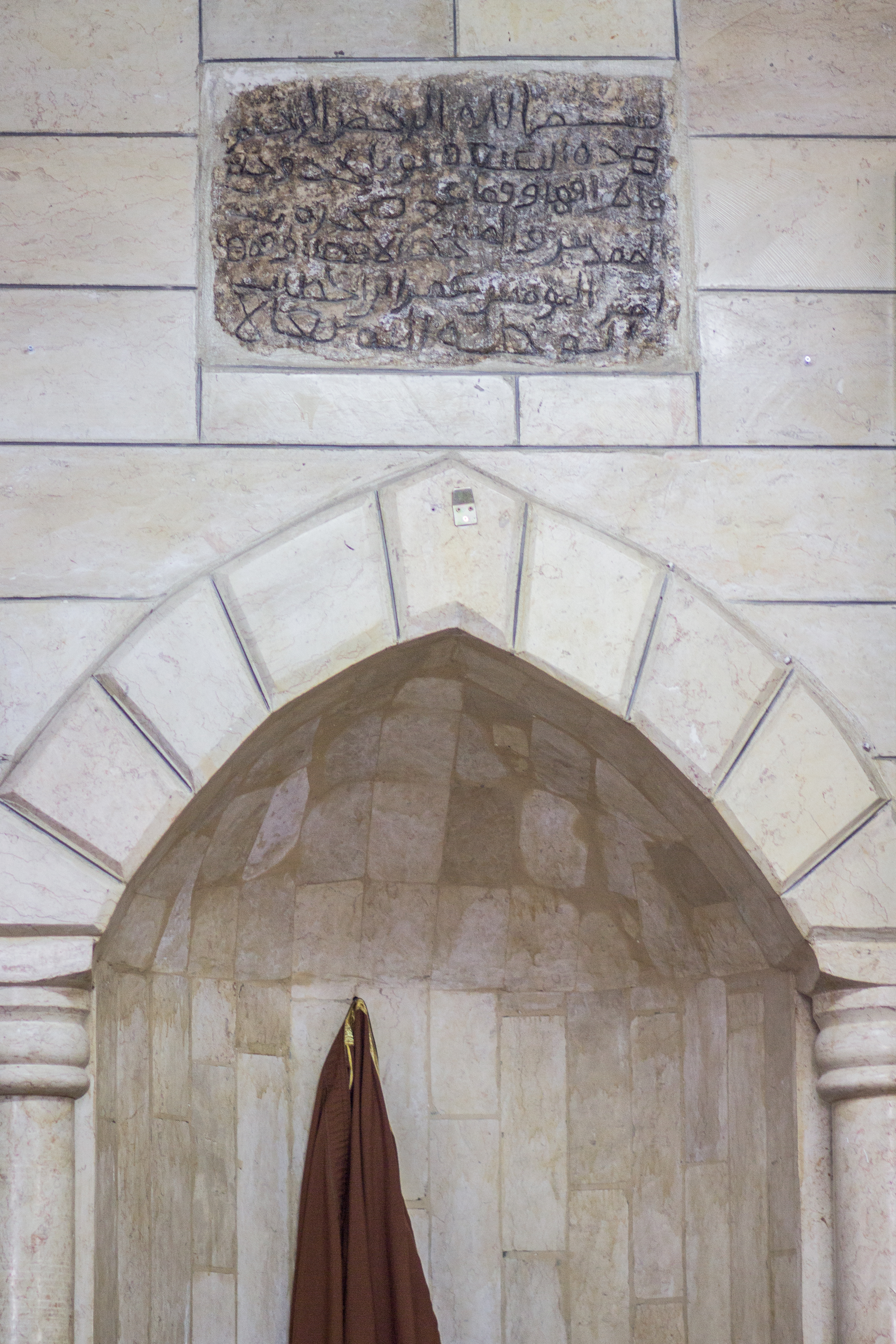
- The Nuba inscription
- Material: Stone
- Writing: Arabic
- Created: 9th century
- Present location: Mosque of Umar near Hebron
- Period: Early Islamic period

The Nuba inscription is an early Islamic text in Arabic that was found above the miḥrāb of the Mosque of Umar in the Palestinian village of Nuba near Hebron.

The inscription identifies the Dome of the Rock and the Al-Aqsa Mosque atop the Temple Mount in Jerusalem as "Bayt al Maqdis" or "The Holy Temple", "Beit haMikdash" in Hebrew This finding suggests that early Muslims were aware of the Temple Mount's significance as the site of the Jewish Temple and viewed the Dome of the Rock as a symbolic reestablishment of this sacred space.

The inscription reads,

In the name of Allah, the merciful God, this territory, Nuba, and all its boundaries and its entire area, is an endowment to the Rock of Bayt al-Maqdis and the al-Aqsa Mosque, as it was dedicated by the Commander of the Faithful, ̒Umar iben al-Khattab for the sake of Allah the Almighty.
