= Trumpeting Place inscription =

Ancient Second Temple inscribed stone

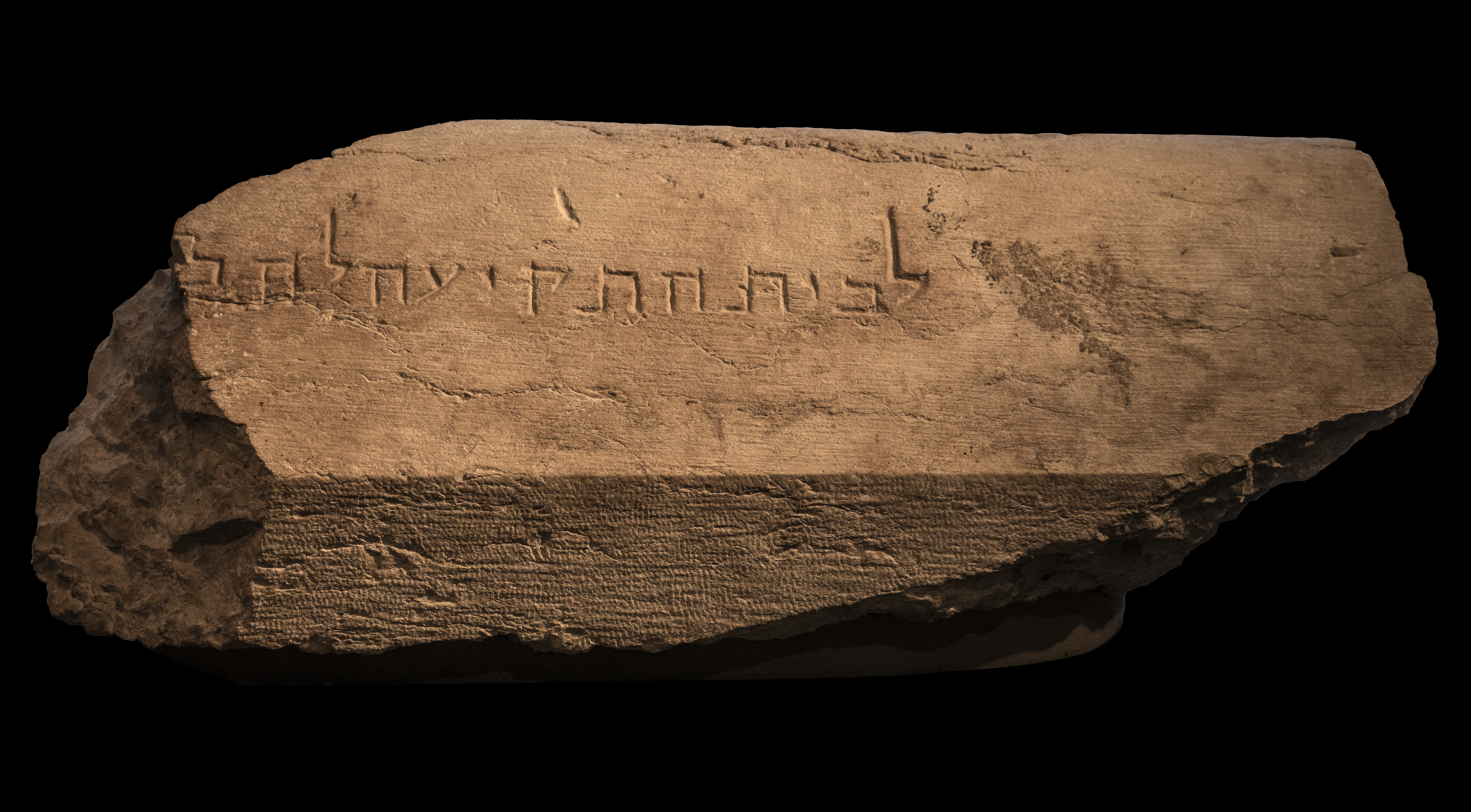
- The Trumpeting Place inscription
- Material: Basalt
- Size: 84 by 31 by 26 centimetres (2 ft 9 in × 1 ft 0 in × 10 in)
- Writing: Square Hebrew alphabet
- Created: 1st century CE
- Discovered: 1968
- Present location: Israel Museum
- Identification: IAA 78-1439

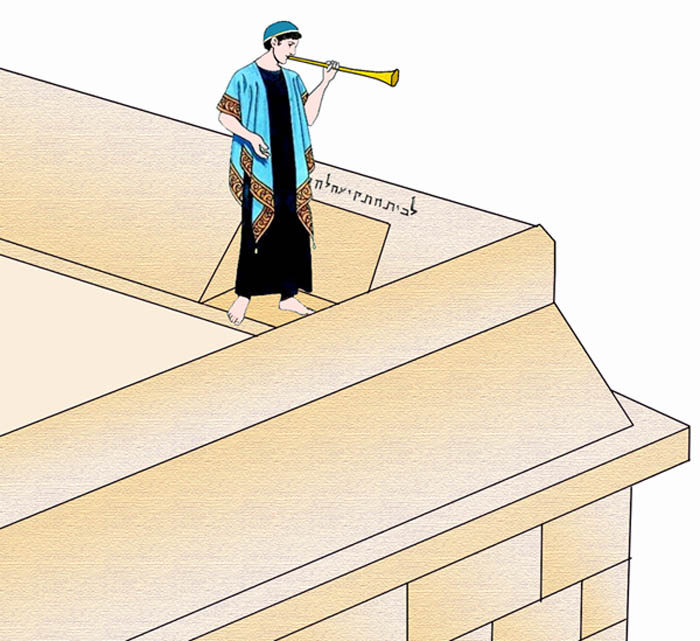
Reconstruction of the location of the stone, and the location where the priest stood

The Trumpeting Place inscription is an inscribed stone from the 1st century CE discovered in 1968 by Benjamin Mazar in his early excavations of the southern wall of the Temple Mount. The stone, showing just two complete words written in the Square Hebrew alphabet, was carved above a wide depression cut into the inner face of the stone. The first word is translated as "to the place" and the second word "of trumpeting" or "of blasting" or "of blowing", giving the phrase "To the Trumpeting Place". The subsequent words of the inscription are cut off. The third word (...לה), which is incomplete, has been interpreted as either "declare" or "distinguish", giving either: "to d[eclare (the Sabbath)]" or "to d[istinguish (between the sacred and the profane)]", where the words in square brackets represent scholarly conjecture.

The inscription is believed to be a directional sign for the priests who blew a trumpet announcing the beginning and end of the Shabbat in the Second Temple period. It is thought to have fallen from the southwest corner of the Temple Mount to the street below prior to its discovery. It has been connected to a passage in Josephus's The Jewish War (IV, ix, 12) in which he describes a part of the Temple: "the point where it was custom for one of the priests to stand and to give notice, by sound of trumpet, in the afternoon of the approach, and on the following evening of the close, of every seventh day".

The inscribed stone was probably thrown over after the destruction of the Temple and city in 70 CE, where it remained for almost 1900 years until Mazar found it.

== Text ==
Text	…לביתהתקיעהלה
Transliteration	lbythtqyʕhlh…
Romanization	l-beyt ha-taqi'ah l-h…
Possible completion	לבית התקיעה להכריז or לבית התקיעה להבדיל
Translation	To the place of trumpeting to d…[eclare?] or To the place of trumpeting to d…[istinguish?]

== Gallery ==
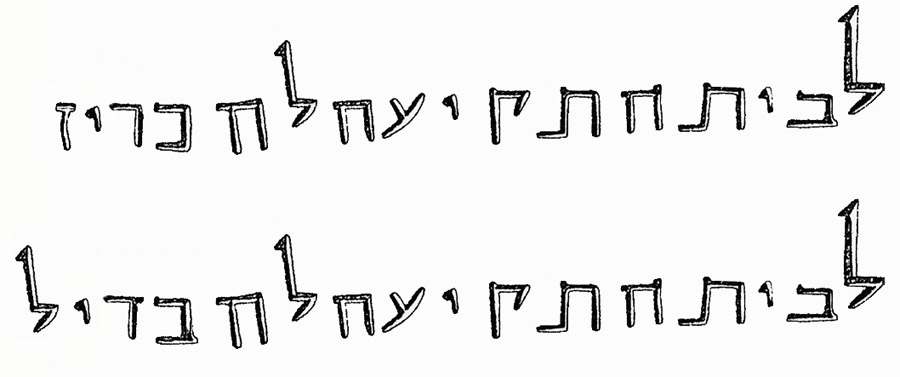
Two possible extensions of the inscription

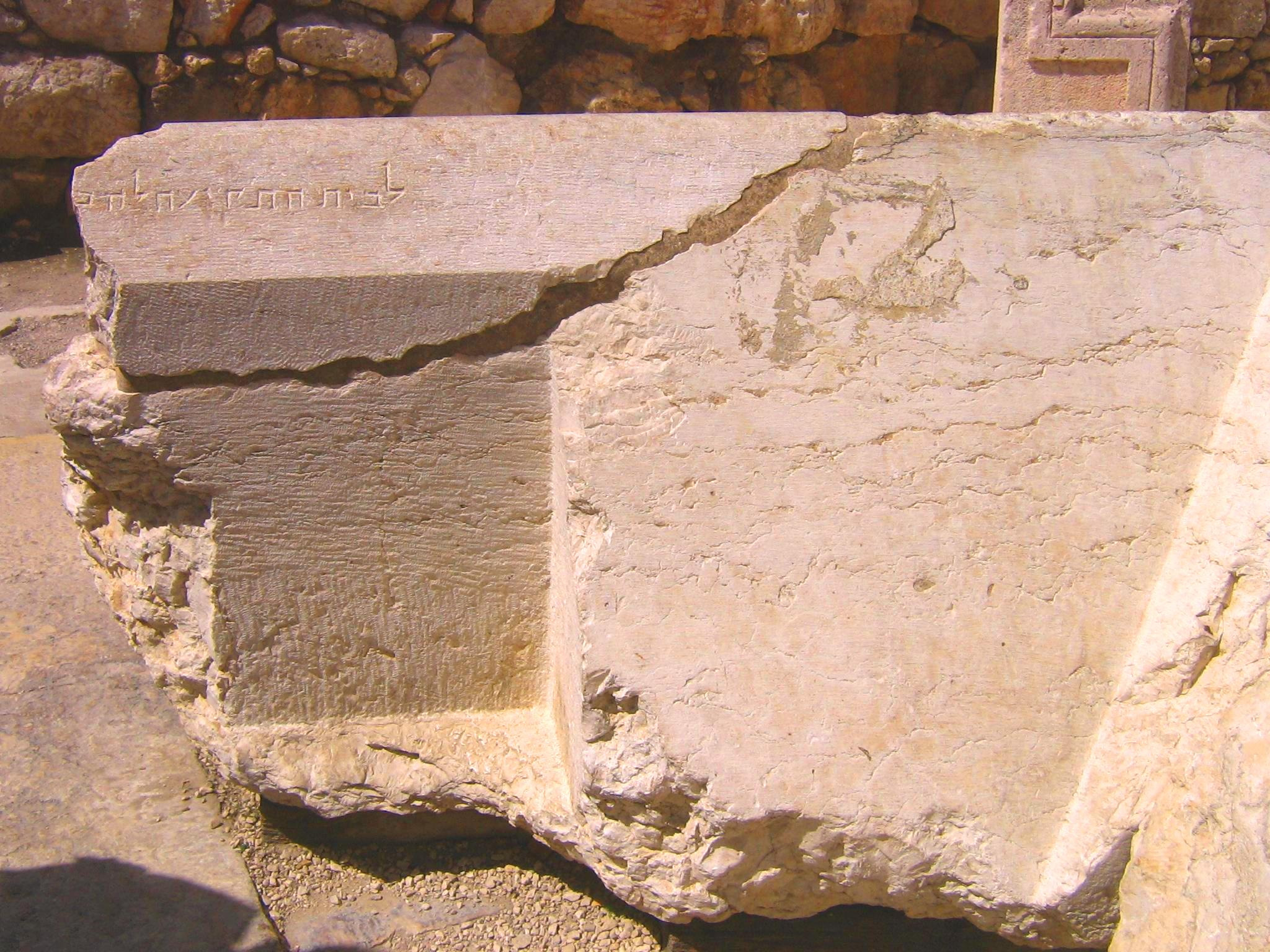
Reconstruction in the Jerusalem Archaeological Park

== See also ==
- List of inscriptions in biblical archaeology
- Temple Warning inscription
- Theodotos inscription
