= Hermetica =

Philosophical texts attributed to Hermes Trismegistus

The Hermetica are texts attributed to the legendary Hellenistic figure Hermes Trismegistus, a syncretic combination of the Greek god Hermes and the Egyptian god Thoth. These texts may vary widely in content and purpose, but by modern convention are usually subdivided into two main categories, the "technical" and "religio-philosophical" Hermetica.

The category of "technical" Hermetica encompasses a broad variety of treatises dealing with astrology, medicine and pharmacology, alchemy, and magic, the oldest of which were written in Greek and may go back as far as the second or third century BCE. Many of the texts belonging to this category were later translated into Arabic and Latin, often being extensively revised and expanded throughout the centuries. Some of them were also originally written in Arabic, though in many cases their status as original works or translations remains unclear. These Arabic and Latin Hermetic texts were widely copied throughout the Middle Ages (the most famous example being the Emerald Tablet).

The "religio-philosophical" Hermetica constitute a relatively coherent set of religio-philosophical treatises, primarily written in the second and third centuries. However, the very earliest one of them, the Definitions of Hermes Trismegistus to Asclepius, may go back to the first century CE. They are chiefly focused on the relationship between human beings, the cosmos, and God (thus combining philosophical anthropology, cosmology, and theology). Many of them are also moral exhortations calling for a way of life (the "way of Hermes") leading to spiritual rebirth, and eventually to divinization in the form of a heavenly ascent. The treatises in this category were probably all originally written in Greek, although some of them survive only in Coptic, Armenian, or Latin translations. During the Middle Ages, most of them were only accessible to Byzantine scholars (an important exception being the Asclepius, which mainly survives in an early Latin translation), until a compilation of Greek Hermetic treatises known as the Corpus Hermeticum was translated into Latin by the Renaissance scholars Marsilio Ficino (1433–1499) and Lodovico Lazzarelli (1447–1500).

Although strongly influenced by Greek and Hellenistic philosophy (especially Middle Platonism and Stoicism), and to a lesser extent also by Jewish ideas, many of the early Greek Hermetic treatises also contain distinctly Egyptian elements, most notably in their affinity with traditional Egyptian wisdom literature. This used to be the subject of much doubt, but it is now generally admitted that the Hermetica as such did in fact originate in Hellenistic and Roman Egypt, even if most of the later Hermetic writings (which continued to be composed at least until the twelfth century CE) did not. It may even be the case that the great bulk of the early Greek Hermetica were written by Hellenizing members of the Egyptian priestly class, whose intellectual activity was centred in the environment of Egyptian temples.

== Technical Hermetica ==
=== Greek ===
==== Greek astrological Hermetica ====
The oldest known texts associated with Hermes Trismegistus are a number of astrological works which may go back as far as the second or third century BCE:

- The Salmeschoiniaka (the "Wandering of the Influences"), perhaps composed in Alexandria in the second or third century BCE, deals with the configurations of the stars.
- The Nechepsos-Petosiris texts are a number of anonymous works dating to the second century BCE which were falsely attributed to the Egyptian king Necho II (610–595 BCE, referred to in the texts as Nechepsos) and his legendary priest Petese (referred to in the texts as Petosiris). These texts, only fragments of which survive, ascribe the astrological knowledge they convey to the authority of Hermes.
- The Art of Eudoxus is a treatise on astronomy which was preserved in a second-century BCE papyrus and which mentions Hermes as an authority.
- The Liber Hermetis ("The Book of Hermes") is an important work on astrology laying out the names of the decans (a distinctly Egyptian system that divided the zodiac into 36 parts). It survives only in an early (fourth- or fifth-century CE) Latin translation, but contains elements that may be traced to the second or third century BCE.

Other early Greek Hermetic works on astrology include:

- The Brontologion: a treatise on the various effects of thunder in different months.
- The Peri seismōn ("On earthquakes"): a treatise on the relation between earthquakes and astrological signs.
- The Book of Asclepius Called Myriogenesis: a treatise on astrological medicine.
- The Holy Book of Hermes to Asclepius: a treatise on astrological botany describing the relationships between various plants and the decans.
- The Fifteen Stars, Stones, Plants and Images: a treatise on astrological mineralogy and botany dealing with the effect of the stars on the pharmaceutical powers of minerals and plants.

==== Greek alchemical Hermetica ====
Starting in the first century BCE, a number of Greek works on alchemy were attributed to Hermes Trismegistus. These are now all lost, except for a number of fragments (one of the larger of which is called Isis the Prophetess to Her Son Horus) preserved in later alchemical works dating to the second and third centuries CE. Especially important is the use made of them by the Egyptian alchemist Zosimus of Panopolis (fl. c. 300 CE), who also seems to have been familiar with the religio-philosophical Hermetica. Hermes' name would become more firmly associated with alchemy in the medieval Arabic sources (see below), of which it is not yet clear to what extent they drew on the earlier Greek literature.

==== Greek magical Hermetica ====
- The Cyranides is a work on healing magic which treats of the magical powers and healing properties of minerals, plants and animals, for which it regularly cites Hermes as a source. It was independently translated both into Arabic and Latin.
- The Greek Magical Papyri are a modern collection of papyri dating from various periods between the second century BCE and the fifth century CE. They mainly contain practical instructions for spells and incantations, some of which cite Hermes as a source.

=== Arabic ===
Many Arabic works attributed to Hermes Trismegistus still exist today, although the great majority of them have not yet been published or studied by modern scholars. For this reason too, it is often not clear to what extent they drew on earlier Greek sources. The following is a very incomplete list of known works:

==== Arabic astrological Hermetica ====
Some of the earliest attested Arabic Hermetic texts deal with astrology:

- The Qaḍīb al-dhahab ("The Rod of Gold"), or the Kitāb Hirmis fī taḥwīl sinī l-mawālīd ("The Book of Hermes on the Revolutions of the Years of the Nativities") is an Arabic astrological work translated from Middle Persian by ʿUmar ibn al-Farrukhān al-Ṭabarī (d. 816 CE), who was the court astrologer of the Abbasid caliph al-Mansur (r. 754–775).
- The Carmen Astrologicum is an astrological work originally written by the first-century CE astrologer Dorotheus of Sidon. It is lost in Greek, but survives in an Arabic translation, which was in turn based upon a Middle Persian intermediary. It was also translated by ʿUmar ibn al-Farrukhān al-Ṭabarī. The extant Arabic text refers to two Hermeses, and cites a book of Hermes on the positions of the planets.
- The Kitāb Asrār an-nujūm ("The Book of the Secrets of the Stars", later translated into Latin as the Liber de stellis beibeniis) is a treatise describing the influences of the brightest fixed stars on personal characteristics. The Arabic work was translated from a Middle Persian version which can be shown to date from before c. 500 CE, and which shared a source with the Byzantine astrologer Rhetorius (fl. c. 600 CE).
- The Kitāb ʿArḍ Miftāḥ al-Nujūm ("The Book of the Exposition of the Key to the Stars") is an Arabic astrological treatise attributed to Hermes which claims to have been translated in 743 CE, but which in reality was probably translated in the circles of Abu Ma'shar al-Balkhi (787–886 CE).

==== Arabic alchemical Hermetica ====
- The Sirr al-khalīqa wa-ṣanʿat al-ṭabīʿa ("The Secret of Creation and the Art of Nature"), also known as the Kitāb al-ʿilal ("The Book of Causes") is an encyclopedic work on natural philosophy falsely attributed to Apollonius of Tyana (c. 15–100, Arabic: Balīnūs or Balīnās). It was compiled in Arabic in the late eighth or early ninth century, but was most likely based on (much) older Greek and/or Syriac sources. It contains the earliest known version of the sulfur-mercury theory of metals (according to which metals are composed of various proportions of sulfur and mercury), which lay at the foundation of all theories of metallic composition until the eighteenth century. In the frame story of the Sirr al-khalīqa, Balīnūs tells his readers that he discovered the text in a vault below a statue of Hermes in Tyana, and that, inside the vault, an old corpse on a golden throne held the Emerald Tablet. It was translated into Latin by Hugo of Santalla in the twelfth century.
- The Emerald Tablet: a compact and cryptic text first attested in the Sirr al-khalīqa wa-ṣanʿat al-ṭabīʿa (late eighth or early ninth century). There are several other, slightly different Arabic versions (among them one quoted in a text attributed to Jabir ibn Hayyan, and one found in the longer version of the pseudo-Aristotelian Sirr al-asrār or "Secret of Secrets"), but these are all likely to date from a later period. It was translated several times into Latin in the twelfth and thirteenth centuries, and was widely regarded by medieval and early modern alchemists as the foundation of their art. Isaac Newton (1642–1726) still used it as a source of inspiration.
- The Risālat al-Sirr ("The Epistle of the Secret") is an Arabic alchemical treatise probably composed in tenth-century Fatimid Egypt.
- The Risālat al-Falakiyya al-kubrā ("The Great Treatise of the Spheres") is an Arabic alchemical treatise composed in the tenth or eleventh century. Perhaps inspired by the Emerald Tablet, it describes the author's (Hermes') attainment of secret knowledge through his ascension of the seven heavenly spheres.
- The Kitāb dhakhīrat al-Iskandar ("The Treasure of Alexander"): a work dealing with alchemy, talismans, and specific properties, which cites Hermes as its ultimate source.
- The Liber Hermetis de alchemia ("The Book of Hermes on Alchemy"), also known as the Liber dabessi or the Liber rebis, is a collection of commentaries on the Emerald Tablet. Translated from the Arabic, it is only extant in Latin. It is this Latin translation of the Emerald Tablet on which all later versions are based.

==== Arabic magical Hermetica ====
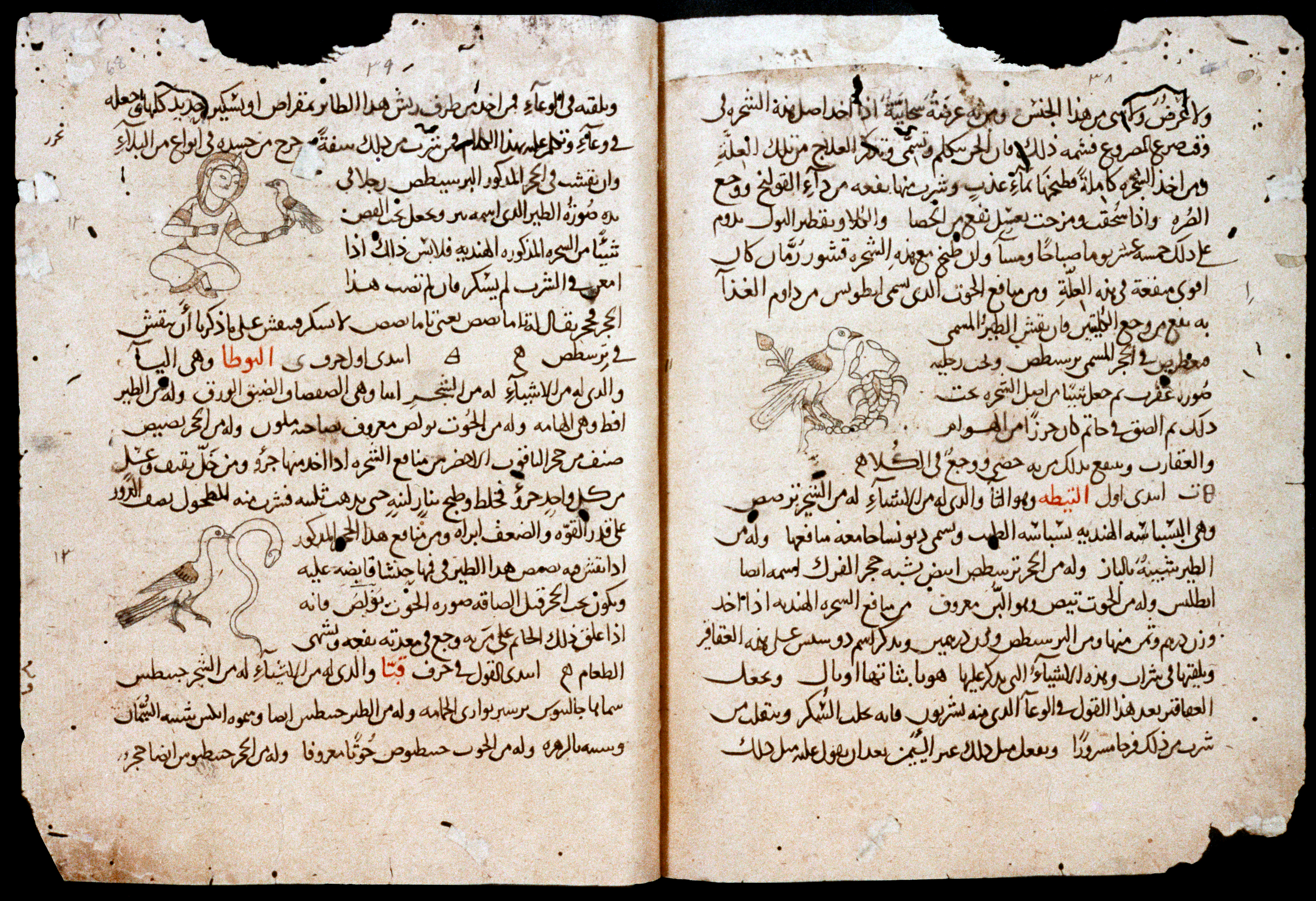
14th-century Arabic manuscript of the Cyranides

- The Kitāb al-Isṭamākhīs, Kitāb al-Isṭamāṭīs, Kitāb al-Usṭuwwaṭās, Kitāb al-Madīṭīs, and Kitāb al-Hādīṭūs, also known as the Pseudo-Aristotelian Hermetica, are a number of closely related and partially overlapping texts. Purporting to be written by Aristotle in order to teach his pupil Alexander the Great the secrets of Hermes, they deal with the names and powers of the planetary spirits, the making of talismans, and the concept of a personal "perfect nature". Perhaps composed in the ninth century, extracts from them appear in pseudo-Apollonius of Tyana's Sirr al-khalīqa wa-ṣanʿat al-ṭabīʿa ("The Secret of Creation and the Art of Nature", c. 750–850, see above), in the Epistles of the Ikhwān al-Ṣafāʾ ("The Epistles of the Brethren of Purity", c. 900–1000), in Maslama al-Qurṭubī's Ghāyat al-Ḥakīm ("The Aim of the Sage", 960, better known under its Latin title as Picatrix), and in the works of the Persian philosopher Suhrawardī (1154–1191). One of them was translated into Latin in the twelfth or thirteenth century under the title Liber Antimaquis.
- The Cyranides is a Greek work on healing magic which treats of the magical powers and healing properties of minerals, plants and animals, for which it regularly cites Hermes as a source. It was translated into Arabic in the ninth century, but in this translation all references to Hermes seem to have disappeared.
- The Sharḥ Kitāb Hirmis al-Ḥakīm fī Maʿrifat Ṣifat al-Ḥayyāt wa-l-ʿAqārib ("The Commentary on the Book of the Wise Hermes on the Properties of Snakes and Scorpions"): a treatise on the venom of snakes and other poisonous animals.
- The Dāʾirat al-aḥruf al-abjadiyya (The Circle of Letters of the Alphabet"): a practical treatise on letter magic attributed to Hermes.

=== Latin ===
==== Latin astrological Hermetica ====
The Centiloquium Hermetis is a Latin collection of one hundred astrological aphorisms attributed to Hermes, compiled and translated from Greek by Stephen of Messina for King Manfred of Sicily (r. 1258–1266). Some of these aphorisms can be traced to Arabic sources such as Abu Ma'shar al-Balkhi (787–886 CE) and Masha'allah (c. 740 – 815), while others may have been invented by the translator, who was probably working with a Greek intermediary. It was one of the most popular Hermetic texts of the Middle Ages, known from over 80 manuscripts and some 16 printings between 1484 and 1674.

== Religio-philosophical Hermetica ==
Contrary to the "technical" Hermetica, whose writing began in the early Hellenistic period and continued deep into the Middle Ages, the extant religio-philosophical Hermetica were for the most part produced in a relatively short period of time, i.e., between c. 100 and c. 300 CE. They regularly take the form of dialogues between Hermes Trismegistus and his disciples Tat, Asclepius, and Ammon, and mostly deal with philosophical anthropology, cosmology, and theology. The following is a list of all known works in this category:

=== Corpus Hermeticum ===
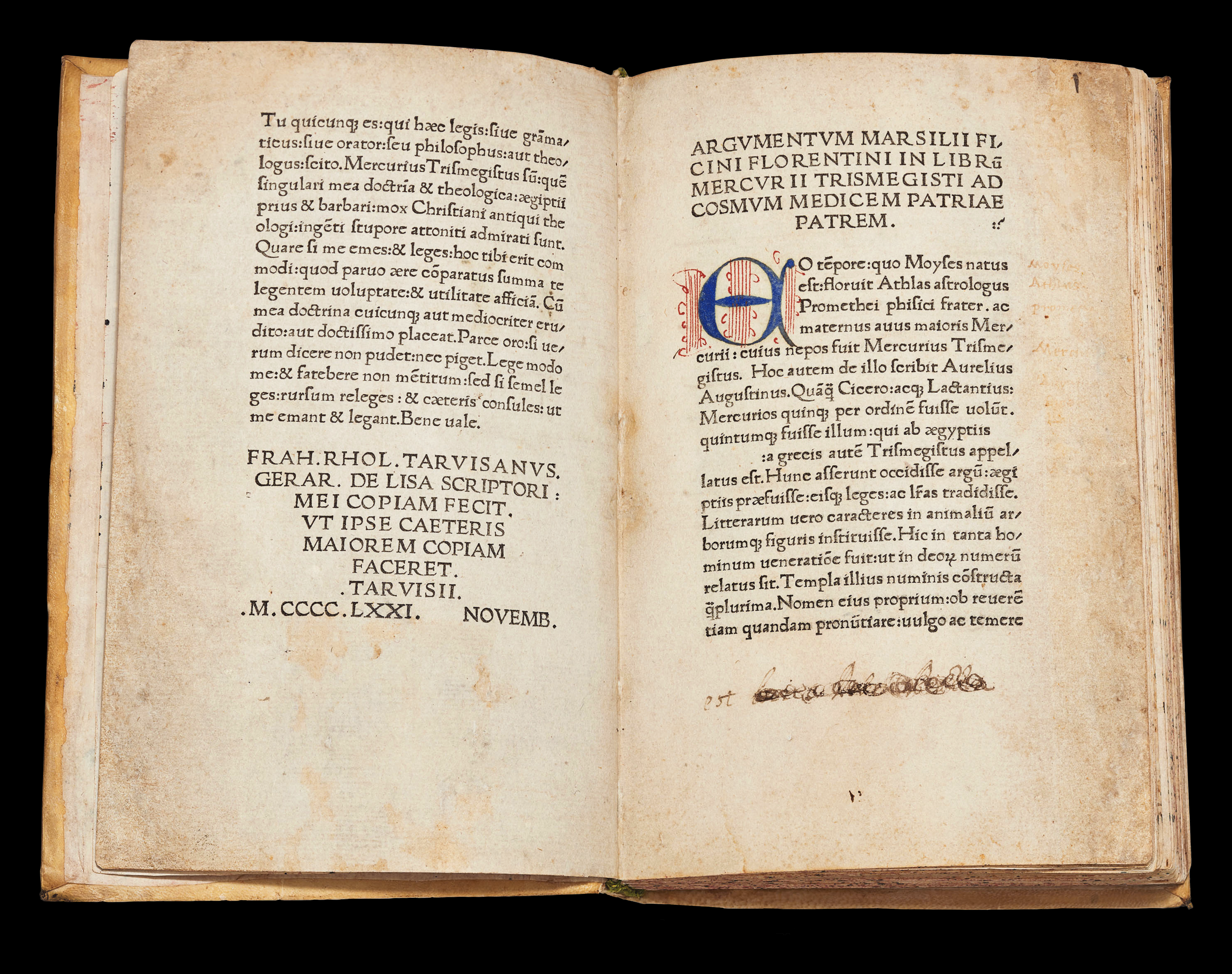
First Latin edition of the Corpus Hermeticum, translated by Marsilio Ficino, 1471 CE

Undoubtedly the most famous among the religio-philosophical Hermetica is the Corpus Hermeticum, a selection of seventeen Greek treatises that was first compiled by Byzantine editors, and translated into Latin in the fifteenth century by Marsilio Ficino (1433–1499) and Lodovico Lazzarelli (1447–1500). Ficino translated the first fourteen treatises (I–XIV), while Lazzarelli translated the remaining three (XVI–XVIII). The name of this collection is somewhat misleading, since it contains only a very small selection of extant Hermetic texts, whereas the word corpus is usually reserved for the entire body of extant writings related to some author or subject. Its individual treatises were quoted by many early authors from the second and third centuries on, but the compilation as such is first attested only in the writings of the Byzantine philosopher Michael Psellus (c. 1017–1078).

The most well known among the treatises contained in this compilation is its opening treatise, which is called the Poimandres. However, at least until the nineteenth century, this name (under various forms, such as Pimander or Pymander) was also commonly used to designate the compilation as a whole.

In 1462 Ficino was working on a Latin translation of the collected works of Plato for his patron Cosimo de' Medici, but when a manuscript of the Corpus Hermeticum became available, he immediately interrupted his work on Plato in order to start translating the works of Hermes, which were thought to be much more ancient, and therefore much more authoritative, than those of Plato. This translation provided a seminal impetus in the development of Renaissance thought and culture, having a profound impact on the flourishing of alchemy and magic in early modern Europe, as well as influencing philosophers such as Ficino's student Pico della Mirandola (1463–1494), Giordano Bruno (1548–1600), Francesco Patrizi (1529–1597), Robert Fludd (1574–1637), and many others.

=== Asclepius ===
The Asclepius (also known as the Perfect Discourse, from Greek Logos teleios) mainly survives in a Latin translation, though some Greek and Coptic fragments are also extant. It is the only Hermetic treatise belonging to the religio-philosophical category that remained available to Latin readers throughout the Middle Ages.

=== Definitions of Hermes Trismegistus to Asclepius ===
The Definitions of Hermes Trismegistus to Asclepius is a collection of aphorisms that has mainly been preserved in a sixth-century CE Armenian translation, but which likely goes back to the first century CE. The main argument for this early dating is the fact that some of its aphorisms are cited in multiple independent Greek Hermetic works. According to Jean-Pierre Mahé, these aphorisms contain the core of the teachings which are found in the later Greek religio-philosophical Hermetica.

=== Stobaean excerpts ===
In fifth-century Macedonia, Joannes Stobaeus or "John of Stobi" compiled a huge Anthology of Greek poetical, rhetorical, historical, and philosophical literature in order to educate his son Septimius. Though epitomized by later Byzantine copyists, it still remains a treasure trove of information about ancient philosophy and literature which would otherwise be entirely lost. Among the excerpts of ancient philosophical literature preserved by Stobaeus are also a significant number of discourses and dialogues attributed to Hermes. While mostly related to the religio-philosophical treatises as found in the Corpus Hermeticum, they also contain some material that is of a rather more "technical" nature. Perhaps the most famous of the Stobaean excerpts, and also the longest, is the Korē kosmou ("The Daughter of the Cosmos" or "The Pupil [of the eye] of the Cosmos").

The Hermetic excerpts appear in the following chapters of Stobaeus's Anthology (which is organized by subject matter, and contains in the same chapters many excerpts and doctrines attributed to others):

- In the chapter "God is Craftsman of Existing Things and Pervades the Universe with his Design of Providence": 1.1.29a
- In the chapter "On Justice, Punisher of Errors, Arrayed alongside God to Oversee Human Deeds on Earth": 1.3.52
- In the chapter "On (Divine) Necessity, by which things Planned by God Inevitably Occur": 1.4.7b, 1.4.8
- In the chapter "On Fate and the Good Ordering of Events": 1.5.14, 1.5.16, 1.5.20
- In the chapter "On the Nature and Divisions of Time, and the Extent of its Causation": 1.8.41
- In the chapter "On Matter": 1.11.2
- In the chapter "On the Cosmos: Whether it Has a Soul, is Administered by Providence, the Location of its Ruling Faculty, and its Source of Nourishment": 1.21.9
- In the chapter "On Nature and its Derived Causes": 1.41.1, 1.41.4, 1.41.6, 1.41.7, 1.41.8, 1.41.11
- In the chapter "How Resemblances from Parents and Ancestors Are Transmitted": 1.42.7
- In the chapter "On the Soul": 1.49.3, 1.49.4, 1.49.5, 1.49.6, 1.49.44 (= the Korē Kosmou excerpt), 1.49.45, 1.49.46, 1.49.47
- In the chapter "On the Interpreters of Divine Matters and How the Truth concerning the Essence of Intelligible Realities is Incomprehensible to Human Beings": 2.1.26
- In the chapter "On What is in Our Power" ("Free Will"): 2.8.31
- In the chapter "On Truth": 3.11.31
- In the chapter "On Bold Speech": 3.13.65

=== Hermes among the Nag Hammadi findings ===
Among the Coptic treatises which were found in 1945 in the Upper Egyptian town of Nag Hammadi, there are also three treatises attributed to Hermes Trismegistus. Like all documents found in Nag Hammadi, these were translated from the Greek. They consist of some fragments from the Asclepius (VI,8; mainly preserved in Latin, see above), The Prayer of Thanksgiving (VI,7) with an accompanying scribal note (VI,7a), and an important new text called The Discourse on the Eighth and Ninth (VI,6). They all share a bipartite rather than a tripartite anthropology.

=== Oxford and Vienna fragments ===
The Oxford Hermetica consists of a number of short excepts from the Corpus Hermeticum and the Definitions of Hermes Trimegistus to Asclepius, as well as some excerpts from otherwise unknown Hermetic works. The fragments are preserved in pages 79–82 of Codex Clarkianus gr. II, a 13th- or 14th-century manuscript held at the Bodleian Library in Oxford. The texts, anthologized from much earlier materials, deal with the soul, the senses, law, psychology, and embryology.

The Vienna Hermetica consists of four short fragments from what once was a collection of ten Hermetic treatises, one of which was called On Energies. The fragments are preserved on the back sides of two papyri, P. Graec. Vindob. 29456 recto and 29828 recto, now housed in Vienna. The front sides of the papyri contain fragments of Jannes and Jambres, a Jewish romance.

=== Book of the Rebuke of the Soul ===
Written in Arabic and probably dating from the twelfth century, the Kitāb fi zajr al-nafs ("The Book of the Rebuke of the Soul") is one of the few later Hermetic treatises belonging to the category of religio-philosophical writings.

== Fragments and testimonies ==
Fragments of otherwise lost Hermetic works have survived through their quotation by various historical authors. The following is a list of authors in whose works such literal fragments have been preserved:

- Tertullian, in On the Soul and Against the Valentinians
- Cyprian (or pseudo-Cyprian), in Quod idola dii non sint (Idols are Not Gods)
- Lactantius, in Divine Institutes and Epitome of the Divine Institutes
- Iamblichus, in On the Mysteries and Commentary on Plato’s Timaeus
- Zosimus of Panopolis, in On the Letter Omega
- Ephrem the Syrian, in Prose Refutations
- Cyril of Alexandria, in Against Julian
- Marcellus of Ancyra, in On the Holy Church
- John Lydus, in On Months
- Gregory of Nazianzus, in Oration
- Didymus of Alexandria, in Commentary on Ecclesiastes and Psalms Commentary
- Gaius Iulius Romanus, quoted by Charisius in The Art of Grammar
- Augustine of Hippo, in The City of God 8.23–26
- Quodvultdeus, in Against Five Heresies
- Ibn Umayl, in The Silvery Water and the Starry Earth
- Michael Psellus, in Opusculum
- Albert the Great, in Book of Minerals, On Intellect and the Intelligible, and Commentary on John
- Nicholas of Cusa, in On Learned Ignorance

Apart from literal fragments from Hermetic works, testimonies concerning the ideas of Hermes (likely deriving from Hermetic works but not quoted literally) have also been preserved in the works of various historical authors:

- Artapanus of Alexandria
- Cicero
- Marcus Manilius
- Thrasyllus
- Dorotheus of Sidon
- Philo of Byblos
- Athenagoras of Athens
- Hippolytus of Rome, in Refutation of All Heresies
- pseudo-Manetho
- Arnobius
- Iamblichus
- Marius Victorinus
- the Emperor Julian
- Ammianus Marcellinus
- Filastrius
- Augustine
- Hermias
- Cyril of Alexandria
- John of Antioch
- Isidore of Seville
- John of Damascus (?), in Passion of Artemius
- al-Kindī
- Abū Maʿshar
- Ibn al-Nadīm
- al-Mubashshir ibn Fātik
- Michael Psellus
- Albert the Great
- Nicholas of Cusa

== History of scholarship on the Hermetica ==
During the Renaissance, all texts attributed to Hermes Trismegistus were still generally believed to be of ancient Egyptian origin and to date from before the time of Moses, or even from before the biblical flood. In the early seventeenth century, the classical scholar Isaac Casaubon (1559–1614) demonstrated that some of the Greek texts betrayed too recent a vocabulary and must rather date from the early Christian period. Other authors made similar criticisms of the Hermetica, largely as a means of undermining various religious and esoteric movements of the time that drew inspiration from them. By the end of the century most scholars had ceased to regard them as sources of primeval wisdom.

Studies in the early twentieth century sought to discern who had written the Hermetica. Richard Reitzenstein first argued that the Hermetica were a product of a coherent religious community whose ideas derived from Egyptian religion, although in later years he thought Hermetic beliefs were largely Iranian in origin, a position that received little support. Scholars in the middle of the century, such as Arthur Darby Nock, C. H. Dodd, and most influentially André-Jean Festugière, argued that the intellectual background of the Hermetica was overwhelmingly Greek, with possible influences from Iranian religions and Judaism, but little connection with authentic Egyptian beliefs. Festugière believed the philosophical Hermetica had only slight connections to the technical Hermetica, and that the former originated with a small philosophical school rather than a religious community. Birger A. Pearson has argued for the presence of Jewish elements in the Hermetica, while Peter Kingsley discounts Christian influence in favor of Greek and Jewish elements.

More recent research suggests a greater continuity with the culture of ancient Egypt than had previously been believed. In the 1970s and 1980s, Jean-Pierre Mahé analyzed the Definitions of Hermes Trismegistus to Asclepius together with the recently published Hermetica from Nag Hammadi. Mahé pointed out that the earliest Greek Hermetic treatises contain many parallels with Egyptian prophecies and hymns to the gods, and that close comparisons can be found with Egyptian wisdom literature, which (like many of the early Greek Hermetica) was characteristically couched in words of advice from a "father" to a "son". Soon afterward, Garth Fowden argued that the philosophical and technical Hermetica were distinct but interdependent, and that both were products of complex interactions between Greek and Egyptian culture. Richard Jasnow and Karl-Theodor Zauzich have identified fragments of a Demotic (late Egyptian) text that contains substantial sections of a dialogue between Thoth and a disciple, written in a format similar to the Hermetica. This text probably originated among the scribes of a "House of Life", an institution closely connected with major Egyptian temples. Christian Bull argued in 2018 that the Hermetica were in fact written by Egyptian priests in late Ptolemaic and Roman times who presented their traditions to Greek-speaking audiences in Greek philosophical terms.

In contradistinction to the early Greek religio-philosophical Hermetica, which have long been studied from a scholarly perspective, the "technical" Hermetica (both the early Greek treatises and the later Arabic and Latin works) remain largely unexplored by modern scholarship.

== See also ==
- Hellenistic religion
- Magic (Hellenistic, medieval European, Renaissance)
- Sage (philosophy)
- Stoic cosmology and theology
- Theurgy

== Bibliography ==
=== Translations of Hermetic texts ===
==== English ====
Some pieces of Hermetica have been translated into English multiple times by modern Hermeticists. However, the following list is strictly limited to scholarly translations:

- Brashler, James; Dirkse, Peter A.; Parrott, Douglas M. (1990). "The Discourse on the Eighth and Ninth VI,6". In Robinson, James M. (ed.). The Nag Hammadi Library in English (3rd ed.). New York: HarperCollins. pp. 321–327. ISBN 978-0060669355.
- Brashler, James; Dirkse, Peter A.; Parrott, Douglas M. (1990). "Prayer of Thanksgiving (VI,7) and Scribal Note (VI,7a)". In Robinson, James M. (ed.). The Nag Hammadi Library in English (3rd ed.). New York: HarperCollins. pp. 328–329. ISBN 978-0060669355.
- Brashler, James; Dirkse, Peter A.; Parrott, Douglas M. (1990). "Asclepius 21–29 VI,8". In Robinson, James M. (ed.). The Nag Hammadi Library in English (3rd ed.). New York: HarperCollins. pp. 330–338. ISBN 978-0060669355.
- Copenhaver, Brian P. (1992). Hermetica: The Greek Corpus Hermeticum and the Latin Asclepius in a New English Translation, with Notes and Introduction. Cambridge: Cambridge University Press. ISBN 0-521-42543-3.
- Litwa, M. David, ed. (2018). Hermetica II: The Excerpts of Stobaeus, Papyrus Fragments, and Ancient Testimonies in an English Translation with Notes and Introductions. Cambridge: Cambridge University Press. doi:10.1017/9781316856567. ISBN 978-1-107-18253-0. S2CID 217372464.
- Mahé, Jean-Pierre (1999). "The Definitions of Hermes Trismegistus to Asclepius". In Salaman, Clement; van Oyen, Dorine; Wharton, William D.; Mahé, Jean-Pierre (eds.). The Way of Hermes. London: Duckworth Books. pp. 99–122. ISBN 9780892811861.
- Scott, Walter (1924–1936). Hermetica: The Ancient Greek and Latin Writings Which Contain Religious or Philosophic Teachings Ascribed to Hermes Trismegistus. Vol. I–IV. Oxford: Clarendon Press. OCLC 601704008. (older edition and translation of the Corpus Hermeticum, the Asclepius, the Stobaean excerpts, and various testimonia; vol. IV [pp. 277–352] also contains an English translation of Bardenhewer's Latin translation of the Arabic Kitāb fi zajr al-nafs or "Book of the Rebuke of the Soul")
- Stapleton, H. E.; Lewis, G. L.; Taylor, F. Sherwood (1949). "The sayings of Hermes quoted in the Māʾ al-waraqī of Ibn Umail". Ambix. 3 (3–4): 69–90. doi:10.1179/amb.1949.3.3-4.69. (contains Hermetic fragments with, a.o., a commentary on the Emerald Tablet)
- Waegeman, Maryse (1987). Amulet and Alphabet: Magical Amulets in the First Book of Cyranides. Amsterdam: J. C. Gieben. ISBN 90-70265-80-X. OCLC 17009220.

==== Russian ====
- Kuzmin, Evgeny (2023). Dvinyaninov, Boris K. (ed.). Книга Антимакис, или Книга духовных творений Аристотеля, или Книга тайн Гермеса. Пер. с лат., ивр., коммент. и вступ [The Book of Antimakis, or the Book of the Spiritual Works of Aristotle, or the Book of the Secrets of Hermes. Trans. from Latin, Hebrew, commentary and introduction]. Code Grimoire. Saint Petersburg: Academy of Cultural Studies. ISBN 978-5-94396-264-6. OCLC 1399455448.

=== Secondary literature ===
- Alfonso-Goldfarb, Ana Maria; Abou-Chahla Jubran, Safa (1999). Livro do Tesouro de Alexandre: Um estudo de hermética árabe na oficina da história de ciência. Petrópolis: Editora Vozes. ISBN 9788532614988.
- Alfonso-Goldfarb, Ana Maria; Abou-Chahla Jubran, Safa (2008). "Listening to the Whispers of Matter Through Arabic Hermeticism: New Studies on the Book of the Treasure of Alexander". Ambix. 55 (2): 99–121. doi:10.1179/174582308X255426. PMID 19048971. S2CID 20127962.
- Asl, Mohammad Karimi Zenjani (2016). "Sirr al-Khalīqa and its influence in the Arabic and Persianate world: 'Awn b. al-Mundhir's Commentary and its unknown Persian Translation". Al-Qantara. XXXVII (2): 435–473. doi:10.3989/alqantara.2016.015.
- Bausani, Alessandro (1983). "Il Kitāb ʿArḍ Miftāḥ al-Nujūm attribuito a Hermes: Prima traduzione araba di un testo astrologico?". Atti della Accademia Nazionale dei Lincei. Memorie. Classe di Scienze Morali, Storiche e Filologiche. 8/27 (2): 84–140. OCLC 718412090.
- Bausani, Alessandro (1986). "Il Kitāb ʿArḍ Miftāḥ al-Nujūm attribuito a Hermes". Actas do XI Congresso da UEAI (Evora 1982): 371ff.
- Bull, Christian H. (2018). The Tradition of Hermes Trismegistus: The Egyptian Priestly Figure as a Teacher of Hellenized Wisdom. Religions in the Graeco-Roman World: 186. Leiden: Brill. doi:10.1163/9789004370845. ISBN 978-90-04-37084-5. S2CID 165266222.
- Burnett, Charles (2014). "Stephen of Messina and the Translation of Astrological Texts from Greek in the Time of Manfred". In De Leemans, Pieter (ed.). Translating at the Court: Bartholomew of Messina and Cultural Life at the Court of Manfred, King of Sicily. Mediaevalia Lovaniensia. Vol. 45. Leuven: Leuven University Press. pp. 155–164. ISBN 9789058679864.
- Caiazzo, Irene (2004). "La Tabula smaragdina nel Medioevo latino, II. Note sulla fortuna della Tabula smaragdina nel Medioevo latino". In Lucentini, P.; Parri, I.; Perrone Compagni, V. (eds.). La tradizione ermetica dal mondo tardo-antico all'umanesimo. Atti del Convegno internazionale di studi, Napoli, 20–24 novembre 2001 [Hermetism from Late Antiquity to Humanism]. Instrumenta Patristica et Mediaevalia. Vol. 40. Turnhout: Brepols. pp. 697–711. doi:10.1484/M.IPM-EB.4.00122. ISBN 978-2-503-51616-5.
- Colinet, Andrée (1995). "Le livre d'Hermès intitulé Liber dabessi ou Liber rebis". Studi medievali. 36 (2): 1011–1052.
- Copenhaver, Brian P. (1992). Hermetica: The Greek Corpus Hermeticum and the Latin Asclepius in a New English Translation, with Notes and Introduction. Cambridge: Cambridge University Press. ISBN 0-521-42543-3.
- Dobbs, Betty J. T. (1988). "Newton's Commentary on The Emerald Tablet of Hermes Trismegistus: Its Scientific and Theological Significance". In Merkel, Ingrid; Debus, Allen G. (eds.). Hermeticism and the Renaissance: Intellectual History and the Occult in Early Modern Europe. Washington, D.C.: The Folger Shakespeare Library. pp. 182–191. ISBN 9780918016850.
- Dodd, Charles H. (1935). The Bible and the Greeks. London: Hodder & Stoughton. OCLC 362655.
- Ebeling, Florian (2007). The Secret History of Hermes Trismegistus: Hermeticism from Ancient to Modern Times. Translated by Lorton, David. Ithaca: Cornell University Press. ISBN 978-0-8014-4546-0. JSTOR 10.7591/j.ctt1ffjptt.
- Festugière, André-Jean (1944–1954). La Révélation d'Hermès Trismégiste. Vol. I–IV. Paris: Gabalda. ISBN 9782251326740.
- Festugière, André-Jean (1967). Hermétisme et mystique païenne. Paris: Aubier Montaigne. ISBN 978-2700735529.
- Fowden, Garth (1986). The Egyptian Hermes: a Historical Approach to the Late Pagan Mind. Cambridge University Press. ISBN 0-521-32583-8. OCLC 13333446.
- Gall, Dorothee, ed. (2021). Die göttliche Weisheit des Hermes Trismegistos: Pseudo-Apuleius, Asclepius. Tübingen: Mohr Siebeck. doi:10.1628/978-3-16-160108-8. ISBN 978-3-16-160108-8. (German translation of the Asclepius, with essays by Sydney H. Aufrère, Dorothee Gall, Claudio Moreschini, Zlatko Pleše, Joachim F. Quack, Heike Sternberg el-Hotabi, and Christian Tornau)
- Hanegraaff, Wouter J. (2006). "Lazzarelli, Lodovico". In Hanegraaff, Wouter J. (ed.). Dictionary of Gnosis and Western Esotericism. Leiden: Brill. pp. 679–683. ISBN 9789004152311.
- Hanegraaff, Wouter J. (2022). Hermetic Spirituality and the Historical Imagination: Altered states of Knowledge in Late Antiquity. Cambridge: Cambridge University Press. doi:10.1017/9781009127936. ISBN 9781009123068.
- Jasnow, Richard; Zauzich, Karl-Theodor (1998). "A Book of Thoth?". In Eyre, Christopher (ed.). Proceedings of the Seventh International Congress of Egyptologists, Cambridge, 3-9 September 1995. Leuven: Peeters. ISBN 978-90-429-0014-1.
- Jasnow, Richard; Zauzich, Karl-Theodor (2014). Conversations in the House of Life: A New Translation of the Ancient Egyptian Book of Thoth. Harrassowitz Verlag. ISBN 978-3-447-10116-5.
- Kingsley, Peter (1993). "Poimandres: The Etymology of the Name and the Origins of the Hermetica". Journal of the Warburg and Courtauld Institutes. 56 (1): 1–24. doi:10.2307/751362. JSTOR 751362. S2CID 190303663. (reprinted, with additions and updates, in Kingsley 2000)
- Kingsley, Peter (2000). "Poimandres: The Etymology of the Name and the Origins of the Hermetica". In Van den Broek, Roelof; Van Heertum, Cis (eds.). From Poimandres to Jacob Böhme: Gnosis, Hermetism and the Christian Tradition. Leiden: Brill. pp. 41–76. doi:10.1163/9789004501973_005. ISBN 978-90-71-60810-0.
- Kraus, Paul (1942–1943). Jâbir ibn Hayyân: Contribution à l'histoire des idées scientifiques dans l'Islam. I. Le corpus des écrits jâbiriens. II. Jâbir et la science grecque. Cairo: Institut Français d'Archéologie Orientale. ISBN 9783487091150. OCLC 468740510. (vol. II, pp. 270–303 about pseudo-Apollonius of Tyana's Sirr al-khalīqa or "The Secret of Creation")
- Kunitzsch, Paul (2004). "Origin and History of Liber de stellis beibeniis". In Lucentini, P.; Parri, I.; Perrone Compagni, V. (eds.). La tradizione ermetica dal mondo tardo-antico all'umanesimo. Atti del Convegno internazionale di studi, Napoli, 20–24 novembre 2001 [Hermetism from Late Antiquity to Humanism]. Instrumenta Patristica et Mediaevalia, 40. Vol. 40. Turnhout: Brepols. pp. 449–460. doi:10.1484/M.IPM-EB.4.00108. ISBN 978-2-503-51616-5.
- Lucentini, P.; Parri, I.; Perrone Compagni, V., eds. (2004). La tradizione ermetica dal mondo tardo-antico all'umanesimo. Atti del Convegno internazionale di studi, Napoli, 20–24 novembre 2001 [Hermetism from Late Antiquity to Humanism]. Instrumenta Patristica et Mediaevalia, 40 (in Italian). Vol. 40. Turnhout: Brepols. doi:10.1484/m.ipm-eb.5.112150. ISBN 978-2-503-51616-5.
- Mahé, Jean-Pierre (1978–1982). Hermès en Haute-Egypte. Vol. I–II. Quebec: Presses de l'Université Laval. ISBN 9780774668170.
- Mahé, Jean-Pierre (1996). "Preliminary Remarks on the Demotic "Book of Thoth" and the Greek Hermetica". Vigiliae Christianae. 50 (4): 353–363. doi:10.2307/1584313. JSTOR 1584313.
- Mandosio, Jean-Marc (2004). "La Tabula smaragdina nel Medioevo latino, I. La Tabula smaragdina e i suoi commentari medievali". In Lucentini, P.; Parri, I.; Perrone Compagni, V. (eds.). La tradizione ermetica dal mondo tardo-antico all'umanesimo. Atti del Convegno internazionale di studi, Napoli, 20–24 novembre 2001 [Hermetism from Late Antiquity to Humanism]. Instrumenta Patristica et Mediaevalia. Vol. 40. Turnhout: Brepols. pp. 681–696. doi:10.1484/M.IPM-EB.4.00121. ISBN 978-2-503-51616-5.
- Mandosio, Jean-Marc (2005). "La création verbale dans l'alchimie latine du Moyen Âge". Archivum Latinitatis Medii Aevi. 63: 137–147. doi:10.3406/alma.2005.894. S2CID 166127275.
- Newman, William R. (2019). Newton the Alchemist: Science, Enigma, and the Quest for Nature's Secret Fire. Princeton: Princeton University Press. ISBN 9780691174877.
- Norris, John (2006). "The Mineral Exhalation Theory of Metallogenesis in Pre-Modern Mineral Science". Ambix. 53 (1): 43–65. doi:10.1179/174582306X93183. S2CID 97109455.
- Parri, Ilaria (2011). "Tra ermetismo antico ed ermetismo medievale: l'Asclepius". In Arfé, Pasquale; Caiazzo, Irene; Sannino, Antonella (eds.). Adorare caelestia, gubernare terrena: Atti del Colloquio Internazionale in onore di Paolo Lucentini (Napoli, 6-7 Novembre 2007). Instrumenta Patristica et Mediaevalia. Vol. 58. Turnhout: Brepols. pp. 43–58. ISBN 978-2-503-53490-9.
- Pearson, Birger A. (1981), "Jewish elements in Corpus Hermeticum I", in Vermaseren, M. J.; van den Broek, Roel B. (eds.), Studies in Gnosticism and Hellenistic Religions Presented to Gilles Quispel on the Occasion of his 65th Birthday, Brill, pp. 336–348, doi:10.1163/9789004295698_020, ISBN 978-90-04-06376-1
- Piperakis, Spyros (2017). "Decanal Iconography and Natural Materials in the Sacred Book of Hermes to Asclepius". Greek, Roman, and Byzantine Studies. 57 (1): 136–161.
- Piperakis, Spyros (2022a). "Plants Full of Signs: Herbal Lore in the Sacred Book of Hermes to Asclepius I". Classical Philology. 117 (1): 163–178. doi:10.1086/717566.
- Piperakis, Spyros (2022b). "Plants Full of Signs: Herbal Lore in the Sacred Book of Hermes to Asclepius II". Classical Philology. 117 (3): 480–494. doi:10.1086/720286.
- Plessner, Martin (1954). "Hermes Trismegistus and Arab Science". Studia Islamica. 2 (2): 45–59. doi:10.2307/1595141. JSTOR 1595141.
- Principe, Lawrence M. (2013). The Secrets of Alchemy. Chicago: The University of Chicago Press. ISBN 978-0226103792.
- Raggetti, Lucia (2021). "The Treasure of Alexander – Stories of Discovery and Authorship". In Brinkmann, Stefanie; Ciotti, Giovanni; Valente, Stefano; Wilden, Eva Maria (eds.). Education Materialised: Reconstructing Teaching and Learning Contexts through Manuscripts. Studies in Manuscript Cultures. Vol. 23. Berlin: De Gruyter. pp. 279–314. doi:10.1515/9783110741124-015. ISBN 9783110741124.
- Robinson, James M. (1990). The Nag Hammadi Library in English. 3rd, revised edition. New York: HarperCollins. ISBN 978-0060669355.
- Roig Lanzillotta, Lautaro (2021). "The Discourse on the Eighth and the Ninth (NHC VI,6), the Prayer of Thanksgiving (NHC VI,7), and the Asclepius (NHC VI,8): Hermetic Texts in Nag Hammadi and Their Bipartite View of Man". Gnosis: Journal of Gnostic Studies. 6 (1): 49–78. doi:10.1163/2451859X-12340102. hdl:11370/d2d06f89-5a19-48b8-b1cc-852c9490c870.
- Ruska, Julius (1926). Tabula Smaragdina. Ein Beitrag zur Geschichte der hermetischen Literatur. Heidelberg: Winter. OCLC 6751465.
- Saif, Liana (2021). "A Preliminary Study of the Pseudo-Aristotelian Hermetica: Texts, Context, and Doctrines". Al-ʿUṣūr al-Wusṭā. 29 (1): 20–80. doi:10.52214/uw.v29i1.8895. hdl:11245.1/9945e817-ced0-403f-8e0a-45e19156c79c. S2CID 244916418.
- Van Bladel, Kevin (2009). The Arabic Hermes: From Pagan Sage to Prophet of Science. Oxford: Oxford University Press. doi:10.1093/acprof:oso/9780195376135.001.0001. ISBN 978-0-19-537613-5.
- Van den Kerchove, Anna (2012). La Voie d'Hermès. Pratiques rituelles et traités hermétiques. Nag Hammadi and Manichaean Studies 77. Leyde: Brill. doi:10.1163/9789004223653. ISBN 978-90-04-22345-5.
- Van den Kerchove, Anna (2017). Hermès Trismégiste. Le messager divin. Paris: Éditions Entrelacs. ISBN 979-1-09-017447-4.
- Weisser, Ursula (1980). Das "Buch über das Geheimnis der Schöpfung" von Pseudo-Apollonios von Tyana. Berlin: De Gruyter. doi:10.1515/9783110866933. ISBN 978-3-11-086693-3.

=== Editions of Hermetic texts ===
==== Greek ====
- Kaimakis, Dimitris (1976). Die Kyraniden. Meisenheim am Glan: Hain. ISBN 9783445013347. (Greek text of the Cyranides)
- Mahé, Jean-Pierre (1984). "Fragments hermétiques dans les papyri Vindobonenses graecae 29456r et 29828r". In Lucchesi, Enzo; Saffrey, Henri Dominique (eds.). Mémorial André-Jean Festugière: Antiquité païenne et chrétienne. Geneva: Cramer. pp. 51–64. OCLC 610335292. (Vienna fragments)
- Mahé, Jean-Pierre (2019). Hermès Trismégiste. Paralipomènes: Grec, copte, arménien. Codex VI de Nag Hammadi - Codex Clarkianus 11 Oxoniensis - Définitions hermétiques - Divers. Vol. V. Paris: Les Belles Lettres. ISBN 9782251006321.
- Nock, Arthur Darby; Festugière, André-Jean (1945–1954). Corpus Hermeticum. Vol. I–IV. Paris: Les Belles Lettres. ISBN 9782251001371. (Greek text of the Corpus Hermeticum and of the Stobaean excerpts, various fragments and testimonies)
- Paramelle, Joseph; Mahé, Jean-Pierre (1991). "Extraits hermétiques inédits dans un manuscrit d'Oxford". Revue des Études Grecques. 104 (495/496): 109–139. doi:10.3406/reg.1991.2504. JSTOR 44264627. (Oxford fragments)
- Preisendanz, Karl; Henrichs, Albert (1974). Papyri Graecae Magicae. Die Griechischen Zauberpapyri (2 vols.) (2nd ed.). Stuttgart: Teubner. ISBN 9783519042778. (Greek text of the Greek Magical Papyri)

==== Armenian ====
- Mahé, Jean-Pierre (1978–1982). Hermès en Haute-Egypte. Vol. I–II. Quebec: Presses de l'Université Laval. ISBN 9780774668170. (contains Armenian text of the Definitions of Hermes Trismegistus to Asclepius)
- Mahé, Jean-Pierre (2019). Hermès Trismégiste. Paralipomènes: Grec, copte, arménien. Codex VI de Nag Hammadi - Codex Clarkianus 11 Oxoniensis - Définitions hermétiques - Divers. Vol. V. Paris: Les Belles Lettres. ISBN 9782251006321. (Armenian text of the Definitions of Hermes Trismegistus to Asclepius and French translation)

==== Arabic ====
- Badawi, Abdurrahman (1947). al-Insāniyya wa-l-wujūdiyya fī l-fikr al-'Arabī. Beirut: Dār al-Qalam. OCLC 163528808. (pp. 179–183 contain a small fragment from the Kitāb al-Isṭamākhīs)
- Badawi, Abdurrahman (1955). al-Aflāṭūniyyah al-muḥdatha ʿinda al-ʿarab. Dirāsāt islāmiyya, 19. Cairo: Maktabat al-nahḍa al-miṣriyya. OCLC 976547332. (pp. 53–116 contain an edition of the Kitāb fi zajr al-nafs)
- Bardenhewer, Otto (1873). Hermetis Trismegisti qui apud Arabes fertur De castigatione animae libellum. Bonn: Marcus. (Arabic text of the Kitāb fi zajr al-nafs with a Latin translation by Bardenhewer)
- Bonmariage, Cécile; Moureau, Sébastien (2016). Le Cercle des lettres de l'alphabet (Dā'irat al-aḥruf al-abjadiyya): Un traité pratique de magie des lettres attribué à Hermès. Leiden: Brill. doi:10.1163/9789004321540_001. ISBN 978-90-04-31584-6. (Arabic text and French translation)
- Kunitzsch, Paul (2001). "Liber de stellis beibeniis". In Bos, Gerrit; Burnett, Charles; Lucentini, Paolo (eds.). Hermetis Trismegisti Astrologica et Divinatoria. Corpus Christianorum, CXLIV. Hermes Latinus, IV.IV. Turnhout: Brepols. pp. 7–81. ISBN 978-2-503-04447-7. (Arabic and Latin text of the Liber de stellis beibeniis)
- Pingree, David (1976). Dorothei Sidonii Carmen Astrologicum. Leipzig: Teubner. (Arabic text of Carmen Astrologicum)
- Toral-Niehoff, Isabel (2004). Kitab Giranis. Die arabische Übersetzung der ersten Kyranis des Hermes Trismegistos und die griechischen Parallelen. München: Herbert Utz. ISBN 3-8316-0413-4. (Arabic translation of the first book of the Cyranides)
- Turāb ʿAlī, M.; Stapleton, H. E.; Hidāyat Ḥusain, M. (1933). "Three Arabic Treatises on Alchemy by Muḥammad bin Umail (10th century A.D.)". Memoirs of the Asiatic Society of Bengal. 12 (1): 1–213. OCLC 29062383. Archived from the original on 2024-12-07. (contains Hermetic fragments with, a.o., a commentary on the Emerald Tablet; translated in Stapleton, Lewis & Taylor 1949)
- Ullmann, Manfred (1994). Das Schlangenbuch des Hermes Trismegistos. Wiesbaden: Harrassowitz. ISBN 978-3447035231. (Arabic text of the Book of the Wise Hermes on the Properties of Snakes and Scorpions)
- Ullmann, Manfred (2020). "Die arabischen Fragmente der Bücher II bis IV der Kyraniden". Studia graeco-arabica. 10: 49–58. (Arabic translation of fragments from books 2–4 of the Cyranides)
- Vereno, Ingolf (1992). Studien zum ältesten alchemistischen Schrifttum. Auf der Grundlage zweier erstmals edierter arabischer Hermetica. Vol. Islamkundliche Untersuchungen, band 155. Berlin: Klaus Schwarz Verlag. ISBN 978-3879972067. (Arabic texts of the Risālat al-Sirr and the Risālat al-Falakiyya al-kubrā)
- Weisser, Ursula (1979). Buch über das Geheimnis der Schöpfung und die Darstellung der Natur (Buch der Ursachen) von Pseudo-Apollonios von Tyana. Sources and Studies in the History of Arabic-Islamic Science. Aleppo: Institute for the History of Arabic Science. OCLC 13597803. (Arabic text of the Sirr al-khalīqa, including a version of the Emerald Tablet)

==== Coptic ====
- Mahé, Jean-Pierre (2019). Hermès Trismégiste. Paralipomènes: Grec, copte, arménien. Codex VI de Nag Hammadi - Codex Clarkianus 11 Oxoniensis - Définitions hermétiques - Divers. Vol. V. Paris: Les Belles Lettres. ISBN 9782251006321. (text of Nag Hammadi, VI, with French translation)

==== Latin ====
- Burnett, Charles (2001). "Aristoteles/Hermes: Liber Antimaquis". In Bos, Gerrit; Burnett, Charles; Lucentini, Paolo (eds.). Hermetis Trismegisti Astrologica et Divinatoria. Corpus Christianorum, CXLIV. Hermes Latinus, IV.IV. Turnhout: Brepols. pp. 177–221. ISBN 978-2-503-04447-7. (Latin text of the Liber Antimaquis, a translation from the Arabic Kitāb al-Isṭamākhīs)
- Delatte, Louis (1942). Textes latins et vieux français relatifs aux Cyranides. Paris: Droz. OCLC 901714095. (Latin translation of the Cyranides)
- Hudry, Françoise (1997–1999). "Le De secretis nature du Ps. Apollonius de Tyane, traduction latine par Hugues de Santalla du Kitæb sirr al-halîqa". Chrysopoeia. 6: 1–154. (Latin translation of the Sirr al-khalīqa, including a version of the Emerald Tablet)
- Kunitzsch, Paul (2001). "Liber de stellis beibeniis". In Bos, Gerrit; Burnett, Charles; Lucentini, Paolo (eds.). Hermetis Trismegisti Astrologica et Divinatoria. Corpus Christianorum, CXLIV. Hermes Latinus, IV.IV. Turnhout: Brepols. pp. 7–81. ISBN 978-2-503-04447-7. (Arabic and Latin text of the Liber de stellis beibeniis)
- Nock, Arthur Darby; Festugière, André-Jean (1945–1954). Corpus Hermeticum. Vol. I–IV. Paris: Les Belles Lettres. ISBN 9782251001371. (Latin text of the Asclepius)
- Steele, Robert (1920). Secretum secretorum cum glossis et notulis. Opera hactenus inedita Rogeri Baconi, vol. V. Oxford: Clarendon Press. OCLC 493365693. (Latin translation of the Sirr al-asrār; pp. 115–117 contain a version of the Emerald Tablet)
- Steele, Robert; Singer, Dorothea Waley (1928). "The Emerald Table". Proceedings of the Royal Society of Medicine. 21 (3): 41–57/485–501. doi:10.1177/003591572802100361. PMC 2101974. PMID 19986273. (contains Latin translation of the Emerald Tablet as it occurs in the Liber dabessi)
