= Prayer of Thanksgiving =

Hermetic Gnostic prayer

The Prayer of Thanksgiving is a Hermetic Gnostic prayer text preserved in Coptic, Greek and Latin.

The Coptic version is found in Nag Hammadi Codex VI, where it is text no. 7 at pages 63–65. The Greek version is found in the Papyrus Mimaut, one of the Greek Magical Papyri, now Papyrus 2391 in the Louvre, where the prayer is at column XVIII, lines 591–611. The Latin version is found at paragraph 41b at the end of the translation of the Greek treatise Asclepius, part of the Hermetica. All three texts were printed together by Jean-Pierre Mahé.

The Prayer is addressed to God in thanks for his gift of revelation. It says that God is called "Father" because he "giv[es] us mind, speech, and knowledge" out of fatherly love. It has a typically Gnostic view of salvation:

We rejoice, having been illumined by Thy knowledge. We rejoice because Thou hast shown us Thyself. We rejoice because while we were in (the) body, Thou hast made us divine through Thy knowledge.

In the Nag Hammadi codex, the Prayer follows the Discourse on the Eighth and Ninth and shares its bipartite, as opposed to tripartite, anthropology. The scribe who copied it may have considered the Discourse to be the knowledge the Prayer was thankful for. A short scribal note in the first person comes immediately after the Prayer and indicates that it was selected for copying from a larger library of texts. In the Latin Asclepius, the Prayer follows Hermes Trismegistus' admonition to his disciple Asclepius that "[G]od finds mortal gratitude to be the best incense".

The Prayer is evidence for the existence of ritual kissing and communal meals among the liturgical practices of the Hermetic community in Roman Egypt.
