= Asclepius (treatise) =

Hermetic treatise

The Asclepius, also known as the Perfect Discourse (from the Greek Logos teleios), (Note: Alternative translations of the Greek title include the Perfect Word and the Perfect Teaching, in Latin Sermo perfectus.) is a religio-philosophical Hermetic treatise. The original Greek text, which was likely written in Alexandria between 100 CE and 300 CE, is largely lost and only a few passages quoted by Classical authors have come down to us. However, the full text is extant in an early Latin translation, and a lengthy excerpt from a Coptic translation have also been found among the documents discovered in Nag Hammadi.

== Contents ==
The text takes the form of a dialogue, set in the sanctuary of an Egyptian temple, between Hermes Trismegistus and three of his students: Asclepius (a grandson of the Greek god and physician Asclepius), Tat, and Hammon.

== Legacy ==
Medieval Latin readers had access to many Hermetic treatises of a 'technical' nature (astrological, alchemical, or magical, often translated from the Arabic). However, the Asclepius was the only Hermetic treatise belonging to the 'religio-philosophical' category that was available in Latin before Marsilio Ficino's (1433–1499) and Lodovico Lazzarelli's (1447–1500) translation of the 17 Greek treatises that constitute the Corpus Hermeticum. During the Middle Ages, the Asclepius was falsely attributed to the Middle Platonist philosopher Apuleius (c. 124 – after 170).

The text of the Asclepius was used by the philosopher Peter Abelard (1079–1142) and his student Robert of Melun (c. 1100–1167) as a means to prove that knowledge of the Trinity was naturally available to pagans. Albertus Magnus (c. 1200–1280) praised the idea developed in the Asclepius that the human being forms a link between God and the world, uniting in themselves both the spiritual nature of divine beings and the corporeal nature of the material world.

== Bibliography ==
=== Translations and editions ===
- Brashler, James; Dirkse, Peter A.; Parrott, Douglas M. (1990). "Asclepius 21–29 VI,8". In Robinson, James M. (ed.). The Nag Hammadi Library in English (3rd ed.). New York: HarperCollins. pp. 330–338. ISBN 978-0060669355. (English translation of the Coptic fragments)
- Copenhaver, Brian P. (1992). Hermetica: The Greek Corpus Hermeticum and the Latin Asclepius in a New English Translation, with Notes and Introduction. Cambridge: Cambridge University Press. ISBN 0-521-42543-3. (English translation of the Latin text)
- Gall, Dorothee, ed. (2021). Die göttliche Weisheit des Hermes Trismegistos: Pseudo-Apuleius, Asclepius. Tübingen: Mohr Siebeck. doi:10.1628/978-3-16-160108-8. ISBN 978-3-16-160108-8. (German translation of the Latin text by Gall and of the Coptic fragments by Joachim F. Quack)
- Mahé, Jean-Pierre (2019). Hermès Trismégiste. Paralipomènes: Grec, copte, arménien. Codex VI de Nag Hammadi - Codex Clarkianus 11 Oxoniensis - Définitions hermétiques - Divers. Vol. V. Paris: Les Belles Lettres. ISBN 9782251006321. (edition of the Coptic fragments, with French translation)
- Nock, Arthur Darby; Festugière, André-Jean (1945–1954). Corpus Hermeticum. Vol. I–IV. Paris: Les Belles Lettres. ISBN 9782251001371. (critical edition of the Latin text)
- Salaman, Clement (2007). Asclepius: The Perfect Discourse of Hermes Trismegistus. London: Bloomsbury. ISBN 9780715635643. (English translation of the Latin text)
- Stefani, Matteo (2019). Pseudo-Apuleius (Hermes Trismegistus): Asclepius. Corpus Christianorum Continuatio Mediaevalis. Vol. 143. Turnhout: Brepols. ISBN 978-2-503-58477-5. (new critical edition of the Latin text)

=== Secondary literature ===
- Burnett, Charles (2004). "The Arabic Hermes in the Works of Adelard of Bath". In Lucentini, P.; Parri, I.; Perrone Compagni, V. (eds.). La tradizione ermetica dal mondo tardo-antico all'umanesimo. Atti del Convegno internazionale di studi, Napoli, 20–24 novembre 2001 [Hermetism from Late Antiquity to Humanism]. Instrumenta Patristica et Mediaevalia. Vol. 40. Turnhout: Brepols. pp. 369–384. doi:10.1484/M.IPM-EB.4.00105. ISBN 978-2-503-51616-5.
- Ebeling, Florian (2007). The Secret History of Hermes Trismegistus: Hermeticism from Ancient to Modern Times. Translated by Lorton, David. Ithaca: Cornell University Press. ISBN 978-0-8014-4546-0. JSTOR 10.7591/j.ctt1ffjptt.
- Gall, Dorothee (2021). "Einführung in die Schrift". In Gall, Dorothee (ed.). Die göttliche Weisheit des Hermes Trismegistos: Pseudo-Apuleius, Asclepius. Tübingen: Mohr Siebeck. pp. 3–28. doi:10.1628/978-3-16-160108-8. ISBN 978-3-16-160108-8.
- Gilly, Carlos (2000). "Die Überlieferung des Asclepius im Mittelalter". In Van den Broek, Roelof; Van Heertum, Cis (eds.). From Poimandres to Jacob Böhme: Gnosis, Hermetism and the Christian Tradition. Leiden: Brill. pp. 335–367. doi:10.1163/9789004501973_015. ISBN 978-90-71-60810-0.
- Hanegraaff, Wouter J. (2022). "The Presence of Gods". Hermetic Spirituality and the Historical Imagination: Altered States of Knowledge in Late Antiquity. Cambridge: Cambridge University Press. pp. 48–76. doi:10.1017/9781009127936.004. ISBN 9781009127936.
- Lucentini, Paolo (2004). "Il problema del male nell'Asclepius". In Lucentini, P.; Parri, I.; Perrone Compagni, V. (eds.). La tradizione ermetica dal mondo tardo-antico all'umanesimo. Atti del Convegno internazionale di studi, Napoli, 20–24 novembre 2001 [Hermetism from Late Antiquity to Humanism]. Instrumenta Patristica et Mediaevalia. Vol. 40. Turnhout: Brepols. pp. 25–44. doi:10.1484/M.IPM-EB.4.00087. ISBN 978-2-503-51616-5.
- Mahé, Jean-Pierre (2004). "Théorie et pratique dans l'Asclepius". In Lucentini, P.; Parri, I.; Perrone Compagni, V. (eds.). La tradizione ermetica dal mondo tardo-antico all'umanesimo. Atti del Convegno internazionale di studi, Napoli, 20–24 novembre 2001 [Hermetism from Late Antiquity to Humanism]. Instrumenta Patristica et Mediaevalia. Vol. 40. Turnhout: Brepols. pp. 5–23. doi:10.1484/M.IPM-EB.4.00086. ISBN 978-2-503-51616-5.
- Matton, Sylvain (2004). "Hermès Trismégiste dans la littérature alchimique médiévale". In Lucentini, P.; Parri, I.; Perrone Compagni, V. (eds.). La tradizione ermetica dal mondo tardo-antico all'umanesimo. Atti del Convegno internazionale di studi, Napoli, 20–24 novembre 2001 [Hermetism from Late Antiquity to Humanism]. Instrumenta Patristica et Mediaevalia. Vol. 40. Turnhout: Brepols. pp. 621–649. doi:10.1484/M.IPM-EB.4.00119. ISBN 978-2-503-51616-5.
- Moreschini, Claudio (2021). "Die Rezeption des Asclepius in der Renaissance". In Gall, Dorothee (ed.). Die göttliche Weisheit des Hermes Trismegistos: Pseudo-Apuleius, Asclepius. Tübingen: Mohr Siebeck. pp. 283–306. doi:10.1628/978-3-16-160108-8. ISBN 978-3-16-160108-8.
- Parri, Ilaria (2004). "Tempo ed eternità nell'Asclepius". In Lucentini, P.; Parri, I.; Perrone Compagni, V. (eds.). La tradizione ermetica dal mondo tardo-antico all'umanesimo. Atti del Convegno internazionale di studi, Napoli, 20–24 novembre 2001 [Hermetism from Late Antiquity to Humanism]. Instrumenta Patristica et Mediaevalia. Vol. 40. Turnhout: Brepols. pp. 45–62. doi:10.1484/M.IPM-EB.4.00088. ISBN 978-2-503-51616-5.
- Parri, Ilaria (2011). "Tra ermetismo antico ed ermetismo medievale: l'Asclepius". In Arfé, Pasquale; Caiazzo, Irene; Sannino, Antonella (eds.). Adorare caelestia, gubernare terrena: Atti del Colloquio Internazionale in onore di Paolo Lucentini (Napoli, 6-7 Novembre 2007). Instrumenta Patristica et Mediaevalia. Vol. 58. Turnhout: Brepols. pp. 43–58. ISBN 978-2-503-53490-9.
- Polański, Tomasz (2006). "Literalism and Paraphrase as a Means of Preservation of Religious Textual Authority in the Coptic, Greek and Latin Asclepius' Apocalypse" (PDF). In Galewicz, Cezary (ed.). Texts of Power, the Power of the Text: Readings in Textual Authority Across History and Cultures. Kraków: Wydawnictwo Homini. pp. 87–98. ISBN 9788389598868. OCLC 179545879.
- Quack, Joachim F. (2021). "Der Asclepius im Kontext der apokalyptischen Literatur". In Gall, Dorothee (ed.). Die göttliche Weisheit des Hermes Trismegistos: Pseudo-Apuleius, Asclepius. Tübingen: Mohr Siebeck. pp. 265–282. doi:10.1628/978-3-16-160108-8. ISBN 978-3-16-160108-8.
- Quack, Joachim F. (2021). "Die koptische Version des Asclepius". In Gall, Dorothee (ed.). Die göttliche Weisheit des Hermes Trismegistos: Pseudo-Apuleius, Asclepius. Tübingen: Mohr Siebeck. pp. 309–331. doi:10.1628/978-3-16-160108-8. ISBN 978-3-16-160108-8.
- Quispel, Gilles (1998). "The Asclepius: From the Hermetic Lodge in Alexandria to the Greek Eucharist and the Roman Mass". In Van den Broek, Roelof; Hanegraaff, Wouter J. (eds.). Gnosis and Hermeticism from Antiquity to Modern Times. Albany: State University of New York press. pp. 69–77. ISBN 9780791436110.
- Quispel, Gilles (2000). "Reincarnation and Magic in the Asclepius". In Van den Broek, Roelof; Van Heertum, Cis (eds.). From Poimandres to Jacob Böhme: Gnosis, Hermetism and the Christian Tradition. Leiden: Brill. pp. 167–231. doi:10.1163/9789004501973_010. ISBN 978-90-71-60810-0.
- Robinson, James M. (1990). The Nag Hammadi Library in English. 3rd, revised edition. New York: HarperCollins. ISBN 978-0060669355.
- Roig Lanzillotta, Lautaro (2021). "The Discourse on the Eighth and the Ninth (NHC VI,6), the Prayer of Thanksgiving (NHC VI,7), and the Asclepius (NHC VI,8): Hermetic Texts in Nag Hammadi and Their Bipartite View of Man". Gnosis: Journal of Gnostic Studies. 6 (1): 49–78. doi:10.1163/2451859X-12340102. hdl:11370/d2d06f89-5a19-48b8-b1cc-852c9490c870.
- Sternberg‐el Hotabi, Heike (2021). "Ägyptische Religion und Hermetismus am Beispiel des Asclepius". In Gall, Dorothee (ed.). Die göttliche Weisheit des Hermes Trismegistos: Pseudo-Apuleius, Asclepius. Tübingen: Mohr Siebeck. pp. 223–263. doi:10.1628/978-3-16-160108-8. ISBN 978-3-16-160108-8.
- Tornau, Christian (2021). "Platonische Philosophie im Asclepius". In Gall, Dorothee (ed.). Die göttliche Weisheit des Hermes Trismegistos: Pseudo-Apuleius, Asclepius. Tübingen: Mohr Siebeck. pp. 171–222. doi:10.1628/978-3-16-160108-8. ISBN 978-3-16-160108-8.
- Van Bladel, Kevin (2009). The Arabic Hermes: From Pagan Sage to Prophet of Science. Oxford: Oxford University Press. doi:10.1093/acprof:oso/9780195376135.001.0001. ISBN 978-0-19-537613-5.
