= Corpus Hermeticum =

Collection of late antique religio-philosophical texts

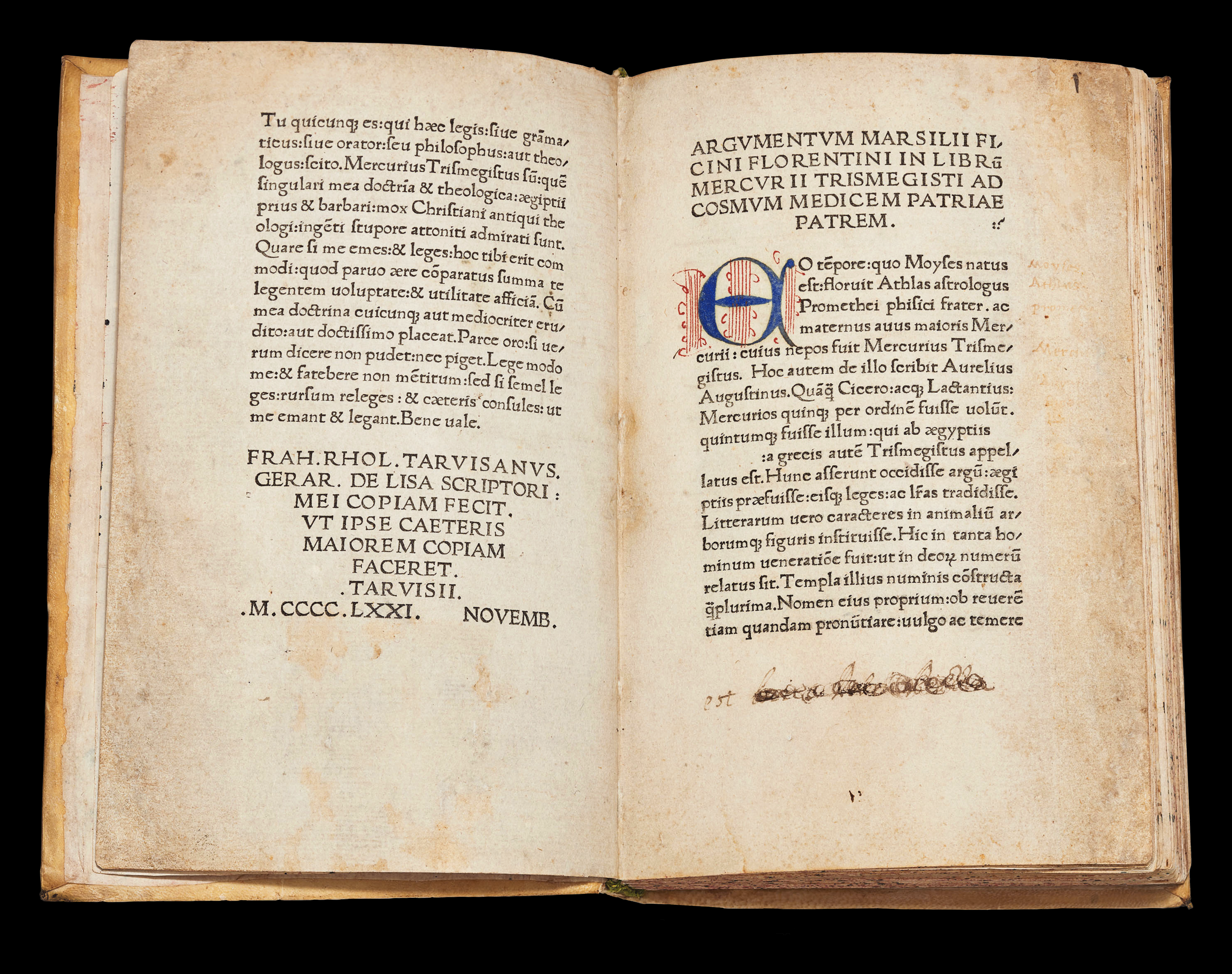
Corpus Hermeticum: first Latin edition, by Marsilio Ficino, 1471

The Corpus Hermeticum is a collection of 17 Greek writings whose authorship is traditionally attributed to the legendary Hellenistic figure Hermes Trismegistus, a syncretic combination of the Greek god Hermes and the Egyptian god Thoth. The treatises were originally written c. 100 – c. 300 CE, but the collection as known today was first compiled by medieval Byzantine editors. It was translated into Latin in the 15th century by the Italian humanist scholars Marsilio Ficino (1433–1499) and Lodovico Lazzarelli (1447–1500).

Although the Latin word corpus is usually reserved for the entire body of extant writings related to some author or subject, the Corpus Hermeticum contains only a very small selection of extant Hermetic texts (texts attributed to Hermes Trismegistus, commonly known as Hermetica). Its individual treatises were quoted by many authors from the second and third centuries on, but the compilation as such is first attested only in the writings of the Byzantine philosopher Michael Psellos (c. 1017–1078).

Following their translation into Latin by Ficino and Lazzarelli, the Corpus Hermeticum greatly influenced the Western esoteric tradition. It was especially considered to be important during the Renaissance and the Protestant Reformation, in which Hermeticism would often function as a type of intermediate position between Christianity and paganism. Hermes's perceived antiquity ensured that any writing attributed to him would take an important place in Ficino's doctrine of the prisca theologia ('ancient theology'), which affirms that a single, true theology exists that is present in all religions and that was given by God to humankind in the distant, primeval past.

== Background ==
Most of the texts are presented in the form of a dialogue, a favorite form for didactic material in classical antiquity. The most well known treatise in the Corpus Hermeticum is its opening treatise, the Poimandres. However, at least until the 19th century, this name (under various forms, such as Pimander or Pymander) was also commonly used to designate the compilation as a whole.

The 15th-century translation of the Corpus Hermeticum into Latin provided a seminal impetus in the development of Renaissance thought and culture, having a profound impact on philosophers such as Pico della Mirandola (1463–1494), Giordano Bruno (1548–1600), Francesco Patrizi (1529–1597), Robert Fludd (1574–1637), and many others.

== Latin translation ==
In 1462, Marsilio Ficino (1433–1499) was working on a Latin translation of the collected works of Plato for his patron Cosimo de' Medici (the first member of the famous de' Medici family who ruled Florence during the Italian Renaissance). However, when a manuscript of the Corpus Hermeticum became available, he immediately interrupted his work on Plato in order to start translating the works of Hermes, which at the time were thought to be much more ancient, and therefore much more authoritative, than those of Plato.

While Ficino translated the first fourteen treatises (I–XIV), Lodovico Lazzarelli (1447–1500) translated the remaining three (XVI–XVIII). The Chapter no. XV of early modern editions was once filled with an entry from the Suda (a tenth-century Byzantine encyclopedia) and three excerpts from Hermetic works preserved by Joannes Stobaeus (fl. fifth century), but this chapter was left out in later editions, which therefore contain no chapter XV.

In 1614 the Corpus Hermeticum lost its claim to predate Plato (c. 428–347 BCE) when Isaac Causabon noticed that it was written in Koine Greek, which developed in the Hellenistic period (323–30 BCE). The discovery of Hermetic writings in the Nag Hammadi library in 1945 has led some scholars such as Jean-Pierre Mahé to suggest that the Corpus Hermeticum and other Hermetica may have a background in Hellenistic Egyptian texts, but the Corpus Hermeticum itself is firmly dated to c. 100 – c. 300 CE, and no other Hermetic text is generally accepted to date from before the third century BCE.

== Names of the treatises ==
The treatises contained in the Corpus Hermeticum (according to the conventional numbering, in which there is no chapter XV) (Note: The chapter no. XV of early modern editions was once filled with an entry from the Suda (a tenth-century Byzantine encyclopedia) and three excerpts from Hermetic works preserved by Joannes Stobaeus (fl. fifth century), but this chapter was left out in later editions, which therefore contain no chapter XV.) are:

- I. Discourse of Poimandres to Hermes Trismegistus
- II. Hermes to Asclepius (Note: The manuscripts provide for this treatise the title "From Hermes to Tat:Universal Discourse"; however, Asclepius, not Tat, is the interlocutor with Hermes here. Following Richard Reitsenstein, the scholarly consensus is that one or more treatises between the initial treatise and this one have been lost in transmission.)
- III. A sacred discourse of Hermes
- IV. A discourse of Hermes to Tat: The mixing bowl or the monad
- V. A discourse of Hermes to Tat, his son: That god is invisible and entirely visible
- VI. Hermes to Asclepius: That the good is in god alone and nowhere else
- VII. That the greatest evil in mankind is ignorance concerning god
- VIII. Hermes to Tat: That none of the things that are is destroyed, and they are mistaken who say that changes are deaths and destructions
- IX. Hermes to Asclepius: On understanding and sensation: [That the beautiful and good are in god alone and nowhere else]
- X. Hermes to Tat: The key
- XI. Mind (Nous) to Hermes
- XII. Hermes to Tat: On the mind shared in common
- XIII. Hermes to Tat, a secret dialogue on the mountain: On being born again, and on the promise to be silent
- XIV. Hermes to Asclepius: health of mind
- XVI. Asclepius to King Ammon: Definitions on god, matter, vice, fate, the sun, intellectual essence, divine essence, mankind, the arrangement of the plenitude, the seven stars, and mankind according to the image
- XVII. Asclepius to King Ammon
- XVIII. Tat to a king: On the soul hindered by the body's affections

== See also ==
- Hermes Trismegistus
  - Hermetica, writings attributed to Hermes Trismegistus
    - Definitions of Hermes Trismegistus to Asclepius, Hermetic treatise belonging to the same subgenre of 'religio-philosophical' Hermetica
    - The Discourse on the Eighth and Ninth, Hermetic treatise belonging to the same subgenre of 'religio-philosophical' Hermetica
  - Hermeticism, philosophical systems based on the writings attributed to Hermes Trismegistus
