= Lodovico Lazzarelli =

15th-century Italian philosopher

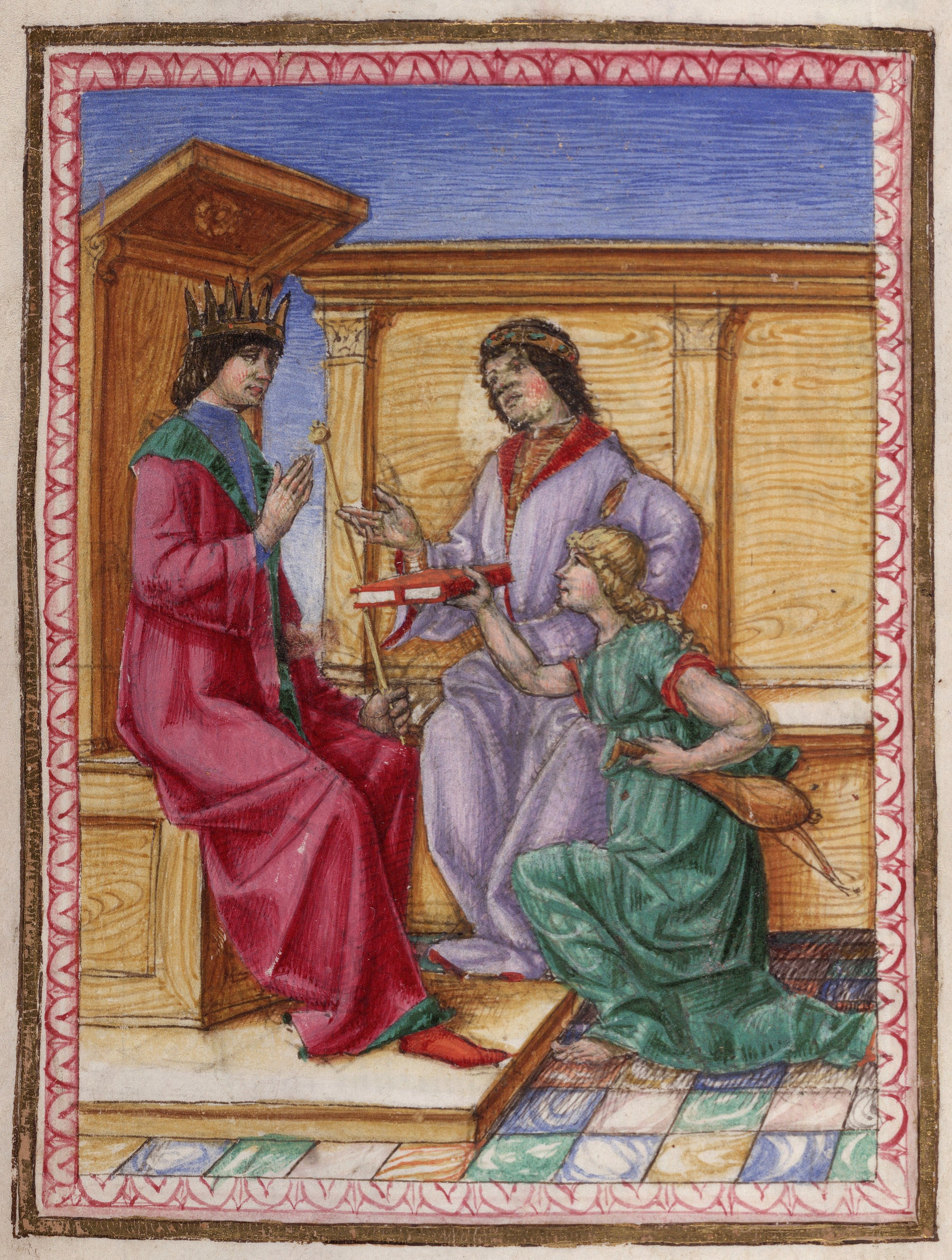
Lodovico Lazzarelli (via his muse) presents the manuscript of Fasti christianae religionis to Ferdinand I of Aragon, king of Naples and Sicily. (Beinecke MS 391, f.6v)

Ludovico Lazzarelli (4 February 1447 – 23 June 1500) was an Italian poet, philosopher, courtier, hermeticist and (likely) magician and diviner of the early Renaissance.

Born at San Severino Marche, he had contact with many important thinkers of his time and above all with the preacher and hermeticist Giovanni Mercurio da Correggio. Himself a follower of hermetism, Lazzarelli also translated the Corpus Hermeticum, a translation which follows and enlarges the hermetic texts previously translated and collected by Marsilio Ficino.

== Biography ==
The most important document for reconstructing Lazzarelli's biography is the Vita Lodovici Lazzarelli Septempedani poetae laureati per Philippum fratrem ad Angelum Colotium written by Lazzarelli's brother Filippo. This text addressed to the humanist Angelo Colocci was written immediately after Lazzarelli's death. The Vita is characterized by an hagiographic tone and pays particular attention to the author's literary endeavors while passing under silence important aspects of his career, e.g. his interest for magic arts. This document, however, gives important evidence of Lazzarelli's otherwise uncertain chronology.

Thanks to this document, for example, we know that Lazzarelli was born in 1447 and earned his early literary education in Teramo. In this town, Alessandro Sforza, the lord of Pesaro, awarded a prize to Lodovico at age 13, for a poem on the battle of San Flaviano in 1460. Lazzarelli's family had moved to Teramo after their father's death, but Ludovico was born in San Severino Marche (in Latin Septempeda, hence Lazzarelli's humanistic nickname Septempedanus).

We also know that Lazzarelli was a student of Giovanni Mercurio da Correggio (Latin name: Iohannes Mercurius de Corigio; 1451-?), an Italian itinerant preacher, Hermeticist, and alchemist who D. P. Walker described as "a wonder-working magus, who had himself, as Lazzarelli tells us, been regenerated by Hermes Trismegistus".

== Works ==
Lazzarelli edited and wrote commentaries on many of the works within the Corpus Hermeticum, often following on from the work of earlier Hermeticists, such as Marsilio Ficino. Thus, he wrote a dedication to Ficino's translation of the Poimandres and Asclepius. He himself wrote a translation of the Defitiones Asclepii, while his most significant work was the Crater Hermetis. As Walker notes:

Lazzarelli's dialogue, the Crater Hermetis, culminated in a mystery, revealed in a hymn, which is based on the man-made gods in the Asclepius...which was one of the main sources of the magic in [Ficino's] De Vita coelitus camparanda...

The work is a dialogue between Lazzarelli and King Ferdinand of Aragon, whom Lazzarelli is initiating into "a mystery which is both Christian and Hermetic - early in the dialogue Lazzarelli tells him: 'Christianus ego sum o Rex: et Hermeticum simul esse non pudet'..." Using Orphic hymns, the king is prepared for "the final revelation of the mystery".

The 'Crater' here is the Platonic krater, envisioned by both Plato and the Neoplatonists as the cosmic crucible in which all souls were created, and that was also represented in the Christian narrative of the Holy Grail. Since the aim of the initiation was to reveal "the kingdom of Israel (which poets call the Golden Age), for which Jesus Christ taught his disciples to pray", there is an attempt here to syncretise Orphic-Hermetic magic and ritual with the Christian message. Lazzarelli associated the demons he summoned during the ritual with "separated bits of the Holy Spirit, or the spirit of Christ" and "interpreted Hermes' attraction of demons into idols as being identical with Christ's inspiration of the Apostles". Indeed, the reference to the Golden Age, which was a powerful Pythagorean motif, also used by many ascetic mystics of the Hellenic period, was also an attempt at syncretisation. In fact, Lazzarelli goes further, to associate Neoplatonic angels and daimones with Christian angels, God's love with Orphic love, and Christian piety with Hermetic piety. Thus, his work was part of a wider attempt to stress the common roots and beliefs of all religions, including Islam and Judaism, that characterised the Renaissance. Accordingly, Walker tells us that, "From the Kabbalah Lazzarelli quotes an allegory, which he says is in the Sepher Yezira". The intent was to connect the Kabbalistic use of Hebrew letters in divination with his own "magical theory of language" in which "he believes that words have a real, not conventional, connection with things and can exert power over them" – another significant aspect of Hermetic mysticism that had its roots in Pythagorean and Neoplatonic belief, and that he wished to integrate into the Christian message.

Thus, Walker firmly associates Lazzarelli with the tradition of Neoplatonic and Orphic magic, theurgy and ritual that emerged during the 15th century in Renaissance Italy, and that was widely debated amongst intellectuals and theologists of the time.

== See also ==
- Contemporary Italian Renaissance philosophers: Marsilio Ficino, Giovanni Mercurio da Correggio, Giovanni Pico della Mirandola
- Hermetica (philosophical writings attributed to Hermes Trismegistus)
- Hermeticism
- Renaissance humanism
- Renaissance philosophy
- Renaissance magic
