= Definitions of Hermes Trismegistus to Asclepius =

Hermetic treatise

The Definitions of Hermes Trismegistus to Asclepius is a collection of aphorisms attributed to the legendary Hellenistic figure Hermes Trismegistus (a syncretic combination of the Greek god Hermes and the Egyptian god Thoth), most likely dating to the first century CE.

According to Jean-Pierre Mahé, these aphorisms contain the core of the teachings which are found in the later Greek religio-philosophical Hermetica (writings attributed to Hermes Trismegistus)..

== Dating ==
The work has mainly been preserved in a sixth-century CE Armenian translation, but the Greek original likely goes back to the first century CE.. As such, it is the oldest of the religio-philosophical Hermetica, which were mainly written between c. 100 and c. 300 CE. The main argument for the early dating of the Definitions is the fact that some of its aphorisms are cited in multiple independent Greek Hermetic works..

== Bibliography ==
=== Editions and translations ===
- Mahé, Jean-Pierre (1978–1982). Hermès en Haute-Egypte. Vol. I–II. Quebec: Presses de l'Université Laval. ISBN 9780774668170. (critical edition of the Armenian text)
- Mahé, Jean-Pierre (1999). "The Definitions of Hermes Trismegistus to Asclepius". In Salaman, Clement; van Oyen, Dorine; Wharton, William D.; Mahé, Jean-Pierre (eds.). The Way of Hermes. London: Duckworth Books. pp. 99–122. ISBN 9780892811861. (English translation, with introduction)

=== Secondary literature ===
- Bull, Christian H. (2018). The Tradition of Hermes Trismegistus: The Egyptian Priestly Figure as a Teacher of Hellenized Wisdom. Religions in the Graeco-Roman World: 186. Leiden: Brill. doi:10.1163/9789004370845. ISBN 978-90-04-37084-5. S2CID 165266222.
- Copenhaver, Brian P. (1992). Hermetica: The Greek Corpus Hermeticum and the Latin Asclepius in a New English Translation, with Notes and Introduction. Cambridge: Cambridge University Press. ISBN 0-521-42543-3.
- Fowden, Garth (1986). The Egyptian Hermes: a Historical Approach to the Late Pagan Mind. Cambridge University Press. ISBN 0-521-32583-8. OCLC 13333446.
- van den Broek, Roelof (1985). "Review: Hermès en Haute-Égypte". Vigiliae Christianae. 39 (4): 403–406. JSTOR 1583779. (review of Mahé 1978–1982)
