= André-Jean Festugière =

French historian of religion (1898–1982)

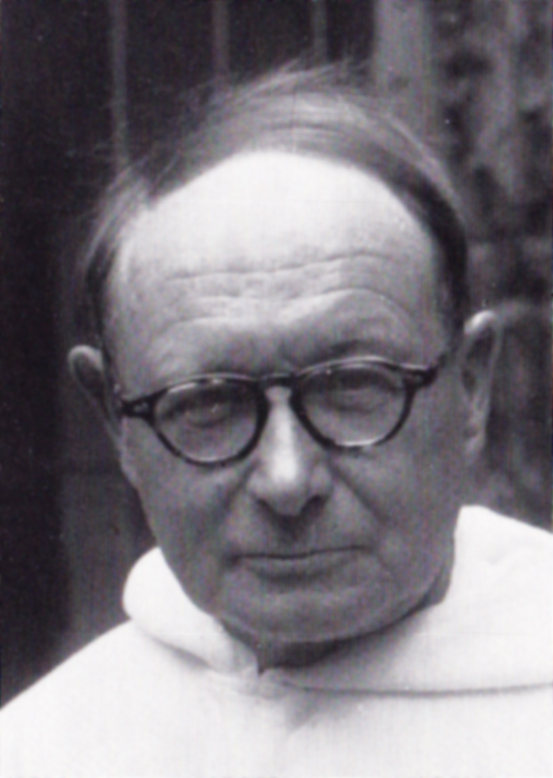

André-Jean Festugière O.P. (15 March 1898, Paris – 13 August 1982, Saint-Dizier) was a French Dominican friar, philosopher, philologist, and expert on Neoplatonism, and in particular the works of Proclus. He is also notable for his translation of the works attributed to Hermes Trismegistus.

== Biography ==
Jean Festugière was the second of a family of nine children, marked by the premature deaths of two sons: his elder brother, killed in the war in 1916, and a younger brother who died of poorly treated tuberculosis in 1921. This brother was named André, and it was in his memory that, upon entering religious life in 1924, Jean Festugière took the name “Brother André-Marie.”

Fr. André-Jean Festugière completed his early studies at the Collège Stanislas, then at the Lycée Condorcet and the Lycée Louis-le-Grand. He subsequently entered the École Normale Supérieure in 1918, where he obtained the agrégation in literature two years later. He then joined the École française de Rome (1920–1921) followed by the French School at Athens (1921–1922).

Following a visit to the Benedictine Abbey of Maredsous in Belgium, he entered the Dominican Order in 1923, before being ordained a Catholic priest in 1930. “The reason is simple: I felt loved,” he wrote in 1980. André-Marie was his religious name, Jean his birth name. As a result, the academic career that lay before him was transformed into a lifelong vocation as a Dominican religious, lived in strict fidelity to the solitude of cloistered life and the observance of the Rule. A new cycle of studies—this time theological—then opened to him, first at the novitiate in Amiens (1924–1925), and subsequently at Le Saulchoir in Kain, Belgium (during the period of exile of religious orders from France), where he was ordained priest on 1930. The following year, he became a lecturer in theology, the canonical rank required for teaching within the Order.

He was Director of Studies at the École pratique des hautes études from 1942 to 1968, and was elected a member of the Académie des Inscriptions et Belles-Lettres in 1958.

His research was devoted to the religious thought of pagan antiquity, particularly in its interactions with early Christianity. He edited and translated numerous texts from the Council of Ephesus and the Council of Chalcedon, as well as works by the Neoplatonist philosopher Proclus, and the Corpus Hermeticum, attributed to the legendary Hermes Trismegistus. “Throughout his life, Father Festugière sought to study the Christian phenomenon within its pagan context. And the more exact and profound his knowledge of that pagan context became, the more clearly the specificity of the Christian phenomenon appeared to him”.

=== Editions and translations ===
- Three Pagan Devotees: Firmicus Maternus, Porphyry, Sallustius, translated from Ancient Greek and introduced by André-Jean Festugière, Éditions du Vieux Colombier, 1944.
- Hippocrates, Ancient Medicine. Paris, Klincksieck, series “Études et Commentaires,” no. 4, 1948.
- Monks of the East (Constantinople, Palestine, Egypt), Paris, Cerf, seven volumes published from 1961 to 1965; reissued by Les Belles Lettres, Paris, 950 pp., 2025 ISBN 978-2251457888
- Erasmus, Enchiridion militis christiani; translated by André-Jean Festugière. Paris, J. Vrin, 1971 (Bibliothèque des textes philosophiques). ISBN 2-7116-0235-4
- The Three Protreptic Works of Plato: Euthydemus, Phaedo, Epinomis, translated by André-Jean Festugière. Paris, J. Vrin, 1973.
- Artemidorus of Daldis, The Interpretation of Dreams; translation and notes by André-Jean Festugière. Paris, Vrin, series “Bibliothèque des textes philosophiques,” 1975; reissued 2005. ISBN 2-7116-0033-5
- Leontius of Neapolis, Life of Symeon the Fool and Life of John of Cyprus, ed. A.J. Festugière and L. Ryden, Paris, Librairie orientaliste Paul Geuthner, 1974.
- Two Preachers of Antiquity: Teles and Musonius Rufus, translated by André-Jean Festugière, Paris, J. Vrin, 1978 ISBN 9782711606979.
- Acts of the Council of Ephesus and the Council of Chalcedon, translated by André-Jean Festugière, Paris, Beauchesne, series “Théologie Historique,” 1982. ISBN 2-7010-1043-8
- The Athonian Corpus of Saint Pachomius, edited by Fr. François Halkin with a French translation by Fr. André-Jean Festugière, Geneva, Cramer, 1982.
- Sozomen, Ecclesiastical History; translated by André-Jean Festugière, Paris, Cerf, series “Sources Chrétiennes,” 1983.
- Aelius Aristides, Sacred Discourses: Dream, Religion, and Medicine in the 2nd century CE; introduction and translation by André-Jean Festugière, notes by H.-D. Saffrey and preface by Jacques Le Goff, Paris, Éditions Macula, 1986.
- Translation of the Gospel of Mark, 1992.

==== Hermes Trismegistus ====
- Hermes Trismegistus, Corpus Hermeticum. Vol. 1, Poimandres. Treatises II–XII; ed. Arthur D. Nock and André-Jean Festugière, trans. André-Jean Festugière, Paris, Les Belles Lettres, “Collection des Universités de France,” 1946. ISBN 2-251-00135-2
- Corpus Hermeticum. Vol. 2, Treatises XIII–XVIII. Asclepius; ed. Arthur D. Nock and André-Jean Festugière, trans. André-Jean Festugière. Paris, Les Belles Lettres, “Collection des Universités de France,” 1946. ISBN 2-251-00136-0
- Corpus Hermeticum. Vol. 3, Fragments from Stobaeus I–XXII; ed. and trans. André-Jean Festugière. Paris, Les Belles Lettres, 1954. ISBN 2-251-00137-9
- Corpus Hermeticum. Vol. 4, Fragments from Stobaeus XXIII–XXIX. Miscellaneous fragments; ed. and trans. André-Jean Festugière. Paris, Les Belles Lettres, 1954. ISBN 2-251-00138-7

==== Proclus ====
- Proclus, Commentary on the Timaeus. Vol. 1, Book I; trans. André-Jean Festugière. Paris, J. Vrin–CNRS, series “Bibliothèque des textes philosophiques,” 1966 ISBN 2-7116-0626-0
- Commentary on the Timaeus. Vol. 2, Book II; trans. André-Jean Festugière. Paris, J. Vrin–CNRS, 1967 ISBN 2-7116-0627-9
- Commentary on the Timaeus. Vol. 3, Book III; trans. André-Jean Festugière. Paris, J. Vrin–CNRS, 1967 ISBN 2-7116-0628-7
- Commentary on the Timaeus. Vol. 4, Book IV; trans. André-Jean Festugière. Paris, J. Vrin–CNRS, 1968 ISBN 2-7116-0629-5
- Commentary on the Timaeus. Vol. 5, Book V; trans. André-Jean Festugière. Paris, J. Vrin–CNRS, 1969 ISBN 2-7116-0630-9
- Commentary on the Republic. Vol. 1, Books 1–3; trans. André-Jean Festugière. Paris, J. Vrin–CNRS, 1970 ISBN 2-7116-0632-5
- Commentary on the Republic. Vol. 2, Books 4–9; trans. André-Jean Festugière. Paris, J. Vrin–CNRS, 1970 ISBN 2-7116-0633-3
- Commentary on the Republic. Vol. 3, Book 10; trans. André-Jean Festugière. Paris, J. Vrin–CNRS, 1970 ISBN 2-7116-0634-1

=== Monographs ===
- Excavation Notebook, Delos (1922), Archives of the French School at Athens.
- The Sanctuary of Silvanus (1922), Archives of the French School at Athens.
- The Religious Ideal of the Greeks and the Gospel, 1932 (Prix Thérouanne 1933 of the Académie française)
- Contemplation and the Contemplative Life according to Plato, 1933. Doctoral thesis under the supervision of Léon Robin, Vrin, 1936.
- Socrates, Flammarion, 1934.

Festugière, André-Jean. The Greco-Roman World in the Time of Our Lord year. Paris: Bloud & Gay. (Prix d'Académie 1936 of the Académie française)

- Contemplation and the Contemplative Life according to Plato. Paris, J. Vrin, 1936; reprint, “Bibliothèque de philosophie,” 1975 ISBN 2-7116-0242-7
- The Child of Agrigento, Paris, Cerf, series “Antiquariat,” 1941 (Prix Bordin 1951 of the Académie française)
- Holiness, Paris, PUF, series “Mythes et Religions,” 1942.
- The Revelation of Hermes Trismegistus, Paris, Les Belles Lettres, 1944–1954 (4 volumes)
- Vol. I: Astrology and the Occult Sciences (1944), xiv–424 pp.
- Vol. II: The Cosmic God (1949), xvii–610 pp.
- Vol. III: Doctrines of the Soul (1953), xiv–314 pp.
- Vol. IV: The Unknown God and Gnosis (1954), xi–319 pp.
- Epicurus and His Gods. Paris, PUF, 1946; 1985 ISBN 2-13-038592-3
- Freedom and Civilization among the Greeks, Paris, 1947. Personal Religion among the Greeks. Berkeley, University of California Press, “Sather Lectures” no. 26, 1954.
- Antioch Pagan and Christian: Libanius, John Chrysostom and the Monks of Syria, Paris, de Boccard, 1959. "Pagan and Christian".
- Hermeticism and Pagan Mysticism, Paris, Aubier Montaigne, 1967.
- Greek Collections of Miracles, Picard, 1971.
- George Herbert, Poet and Anglican Saint (1593–1633), Paris, J. Vrin, 1971.
- Studies in Greek Philosophy, Paris, J. Vrin, 1971. ISBN 2-7116-0243-5
- Studies in Greek and Hellenistic Religion. Paris, J. Vrin, 1972. ISBN 2-7116-0244-3
- The Three Protreptics of Plato: Euthydemus, Phaedo, Epinomis. Paris, J. Vrin, 1973.
- Stylistic Observations on the Gospel of St. John, Paris, Klincksieck, 1974.
- Studies in History and Philology. Paris, J. Vrin, 1975 ISBN 2-7116-0246-X
- Spiritual Life in Greece in the Hellenistic Age, Paris, Picard, 1977.
- The Philosophy of Love of Marsilio Ficino and Its Influence on French Literature in the 16th century. Paris, J. Vrin, 1980 ISBN 2-7116-8072-X
- Ten Unpublished Texts from the Imperial Menologion of Koutloumous, ed. François Halkin, French translation by André-Jean Festugière, Geneva, Cramer, 1984. "François Halkin et † André-Jean Festugière, Dix textes inédits tirés du Ménologe impérial de Koutloumous. Edition princeps et traduction française".

== Sources ==
- Hadot, Pierre (n.d.). "Festugière, André-Jean (1898-1982)". universalis.fr.
- Romilly, Jacqueline de (1985). "Notice sur la vie et les travaux du R.P. André-Jean Festugière, membre de l'Académie". Comptes-rendus des Séances de l’Académie des Inscriptions et Belles Lettres (in French). 129 (2): 406–419.
- Saffrey, Henri-Dominique (2008). "Le père André-Jean Festugière : une histoire littéraire et doctrinale du besoin d'être avec Dieu dans le monde romain". Revue des sciences philosophiques et théologiques (in French). 92 (3): 591–600.
