= Prisca theologia =

Doctrine about an ancient theology

Prisca theologia ("ancient theology") is the doctrine that asserts that a single, true theology exists which threads through all religions, and which was anciently given by God to humans.

== History ==
The term prisca theologia appears to have been first used by Marsilio Ficino in the 15th century. Ficino and Giovanni Pico della Mirandola endeavored to reform the teachings of the Catholic Church by means of the writings of the prisca theologia, which they believed was reflected in Neoplatonism, Hermeticism, and the Chaldean Oracles, among other sources.

...[Ficino] saw himself as one member of a venerable sequence of interpreters who added to a store of wisdom that God allowed progressively to unfold. Each of these “prisci theologi,” or “ancient theologians,” had his part to play in discovering, documenting, and elaborating the truth contained in the writings of Plato and other ancient sages, a truth to which these sages may not have been fully privy, acting as they were as vessels of divine truth.

Enlightenment thought, like prisca theologia, tended to view all religion as cultural variations on a common theme, but it tended to denigrate prisca theologia along with the rest of revealed religion.

The doctrine of a prisca theologia is held by, among others, Rosicrucianism.

Prisca theologia is related to concept of perennial philosophy, but an essential difference is that prisca theologia is understood to have existed in pure form only in ancient times and has since undergone continuous decline and dilution; but perennial philosophy asserts that the "true religion" periodically manifests itself in different times, places, and forms, potentially even in modern times. Both concepts, however, do suppose a unique true religion and tend to agree on its basic characteristics.

== See also ==
- Esoteric Christianity
- Figurism
- Hanif, equivalent concept in Islam
- Omnism
- Pre-Adamite
- Urreligion
- Urmonotheismus

== Sources ==
- Hanegraaff, Wouter J. "Tradition". In: Dictionary of Gnosis and Western Esotericism (Wouter J. Hanegraaff, ed.), pp. 1125–1135. Brill, 2006. ISBN 90-04-15231-8.
- Hankins, James. Plato in the Italian Renaissance, 2 vols. Brill, 1990. ISBN 90-04-09161-0.
