= Planetary intelligence =

Divine beings in occultism

In traditional Western occultism, planetary intelligences are one of the seven divine beings associated with each of the seven traditional planets of astrology. The basic idea is that each planet is part of the great chain of being and has a vast hierarchy of various spirits, intelligences, angels, deities, plants, stones and minerals as partaking in its nature. Within this conceptual framework, the planetary intelligence is the part of the Planet that corresponds to the mental plane, the plane of abstract thought.

== Use in occultism ==
The planetary intelligences are invoked in occultism to control the blind forces of the planetary spirit, specifically in the creation of astrological talismans. The planetary intelligence are also formally invoked in planetary charity to help ameliorate poorly dignified planets in a natal chart.

== Planetary intelligence by planet ==
Moon – Malkah be-Tarshishim ve-ad Ruachoth Shechalim

Mercury – Tiriel

Venus – Hagiel

Sun – Nakhiel

Mars – Graphiel

Jupiter – Iophiel

Saturn – Agiel
