= Poimandres =

First tractate in the Corpus Hermeticum

Poimandres (Greek: Ποιμάνδρης; also known as Poemandres, Poemander or Pimander) is the first tractate in the Corpus Hermeticum, named after its main character Poimandres, the nous of a supreme deity.

== Etymology ==
Originally written in Greek, the title was formerly understood to mean "shepherd of men" from the words ποιμήν and ἀνήρ. For example, this is how Zosimus of Panopolis interpreted the name. Others, such as F. Ll. Griffith, proposed that it is actually derived from the Coptic phrase ⲡⲉⲓⲙⲉ ⲛ̅ⲧⲉ ⲣⲏ peime nte rē meaning "the knowledge of Re" or "the understanding of Re". Yet another theory is that the name ultimately derives from the name of the popular deified Egyptian pharaoh Amenemhet III, whose name was transliterated into Greek in various forms, including Πορεμανρῆς. Poimandros (Ποίμανδρος) of Greek mythology was the son of Chaeresilaus and Stratonice.

== Description ==
The character Poimandres can be considered to be a sort of deity, or attribute of God as nous or "mind" as expressed in the following translations.

John Everard translation:

Then said I, "Who art Thou?"
"I am," quoth he, "Poemander, the mind of the Great Lord, the most Mighty and absolute Emperor: I know what thou wouldest have, and I am always present with thee."

G. R. S. Mead translation:

And I do say: Who art thou?
He saith: I am Man-Shepherd [Ποιμάνδρης], Mind of all-masterhood; I know what thou desirest and I'm with thee everywhere.

Brian P. Copenhaver translation:

"Who are you?" I asked.
"I am Poimandres," he said, "mind of sovereignty; I know what you want, and I am with you everywhere."

Salaman, Van Oyen and Wharton translation:

"Who are you?" said I.
He said, "I am Poimandres the Nous of the Supreme. I know what you wish and I am with you everywhere."

== See also ==
- Hermes Trismegistus
  - Hermetica, writings attributed to Hermes Trismegistus
  - Hermeticism, philosophical systems based on the writings attributed to Hermes Trismegistus
