= Garth Fowden =

British historian

Garth Lowther Fowden, FBA (born 14 January 1953), is a historian. He was Sultan Qaboos Professor of Abrahamic Faiths at the University of Cambridge from 2013 to 2020.

== Career ==
Born on 14 January 1953, Garth Fowden was educated at Merton College, Oxford; he graduated in 1974 and completed a doctorate there in 1979 under the title "Pagan philosophers in late antique society: with special reference to Iamblichus and his followers". Fowden was a research fellow at Peterhouse, Cambridge, from 1978 to 1982 and then at Darwin College, Cambridge, until he took up a lectureship at the University of Groningen in 1983. In 1985, he moved to a research position at the National Research Foundation in Athens and remained there until being appointed Sultan Qaboos Professor of Abrahamic Faiths at the University of Cambridge in 2013. His former Ph.D. student, Valentina A. Grasso, is now a professor at Bard College in New York.

According to his British Academy profile, Fowden's research focuses on "intellectual currents and imperial horizons in the first millennium CE, from Augustus to Avicenna, Central Asia to the Atlantic" as well as "emergent Islam in its late antique context".

== Awards and honours ==
In 2015, Fowden was elected a Fellow of the British Academy, the United Kingdom's national academy for the humanities and social sciences.

== Selected publications ==
- The Egyptian Hermes: A Historical Approach to the Late Pagan Mind (Cambridge University Press, 1986).
- Empire to Commonwealth: Consequences of Monotheism in Late Antiquity (Princeton University Press, 1993).
- Quṣayr 'Amra: Art and the Umayyad Elite in Late Antique Syria (University of California Press, 2004).
- Before and after Muḥammad: The First Millennium Refocused (Princeton University Press, 2014).
- Abraham or Aristotle? First Millennium Empires and Exegetical Traditions. An Inaugural Lecture by the Sultan Qaboos Professor of Abrahamic Faiths Given in the University of Cambridge, 4 December 2013 (Cambridge University Press, Cambridge 2015).
