= The Discourse on the Eighth and Ninth =

Ancient Hermetic treatise

The Discourse on the Eighth and Ninth is an ancient Hermetic treatise. It is one of the three short texts attributed to the legendary Hellenistic figure Hermes Trismegistus that were discovered among the Nag Hammadi findings.

Insufficient information has survived from the manuscript to reconstruct the original title, and so the modern title has been taken from an expression in the treatise itself. References to the Egyptian city of Diospolis and to hieroglyphic characters, as well as certain affinities with the Middle Platonist philosopher Albinus (fl. c. 150 CE), point to composition in Roman Egypt somewhere in the second century CE. It only exists in a Coptic translation, the original Greek being lost.
