= Walter Scott (scholar) =

British classical scholar (1855–1925)

Walter Scott (10 September 1855 – 26 February 1925) was an English classical scholar, professor of classics at the University of Sydney and McGill University, Montreal, Quebec.

Scott was born in Newton Tracey, Devon, England, third son of George Erving Scott and his wife Agnes, née Ward. He was educated at Christ's Hospital School and Balliol College, Oxford from 1874 to 1878.
