= Roel van den Broek =

Dutch religious scholar (born 1931)

Roelof "Roel" B. van den Broek (born 20 December 1931) is a Dutch religious scholar. He was a professor of Religious History of the Hellenistic period at Utrecht University between 1979 and 1991. He subsequently was a professor of history of Christianity until his retirement in 1997.

== Career ==
Van den Broek was born in Alphen aan den Rijn on 20 December 1931. He attended the gymnasium and later studied theology at Utrecht University. In 1972 he obtained his title of Doctor under Gilles Quispel, with a thesis titled: The myth of the Phoenix, according to classical and early Christian traditions. He subsequently worked as scientific employee on the early history of Christianity.

Van den Broek was appointed as Bijzonder hoogleraar (professor not paid by University funds) of Religious history of the Hellenistic period in 1979. In 1991 he was named professor of history of Christianity. He retired on 1 January 1997. Between 1998 and 2005 he was rector of education institute OVP.

Van den Broek was elected a member of the Royal Netherlands Academy of Arts and Sciences in 1993. He received an honorary doctorate of the Paris-Sorbonne University in 1999.

== Bibliography ==
- The Myth of the Phoenix According to Classical and Early Christian Traditions (1972)
- Studies in Gnosticism and Hellenistic Religions: Presented to Gilles Quispel on the Occasion of his 65th Birthday (1981), ed. with M. J. Vermaseren
- De taal van de Gnosis: gnostische teksten uit Nag Hammadi (1986)
- Kerk en kerken in Romeins-Byzantijns Palestina: archeologie en geschiedenis (1988)
- Knowledge of God in the Graeco-Roman World, ed. (1988)
- Studies in Gnosticism and Alexandrian Christianity (1996)
- Gnosis and Hermeticism from Antiquity to Modern Times (1998)
- From Poimandres to Jacob Bohme: Hermetism, Gnosis and the Christian Tradition, ed. with Cis Heertum (2000)
- Hanegraaff, Wouter J.; Faivre, Antoine; ——; Brach, Jean-Pierre, eds. (2005). Dictionary of Gnosis & Western Esotericism. Leiden; Boston: Brill Publishers. ISBN 978-90-04-14371-5.
- Hermes Trismegistus: Inleiding, Teksten, Commentaren (2006)
- De Hermetische Code, eds. (2006)
- Gnosis in de Oudheid: Nag Hammadi in context (2012)
- Pseudo-Cyril of Jerusalem On the Life and the Passion of Christ: A Coptic Apocryphon (2012)
- Gnostic Religion in Antiquity (2013)
- Hermetische Geschriften (2016), with Gilles Quispel
- Vroegchristelijke wijsheid: De Spreuken van Sextus en het Onderricht van Silvanus (2020)
