= Arthur Nock =

English classicist and theologian (1902–1963)

- Born: Arthur Darby Nock; 21 February 1902; Portsmouth, England
- Died: 11 January 1963 (aged 60); Cambridge, Massachusetts, United States
- Education: Trinity College, Cambridge
- Occupations: Classicist and theologian
- Employer: Harvard

Arthur Darby Nock (21 February 1902 – 11 January 1963) was an English classicist and theologian, regarded as a leading scholar in the history of religion. He was a professor at Harvard University from 1930 until his death.

== Early life ==
Nock was born in Portsmouth, England in 1902 to Cornelius and Alice Mary Ann Nock. He was educated at Portsmouth Grammar School.

== Education and career ==
Nock studied at Trinity College at Cambridge University, where he was awarded his bachelor's degree in 1922 and master's degree in 1926. He became a fellow at Clare College in Cambridge in 1923 and then served as a university lecturer in Classics starting in 1926. In 1930, he became Frothingham Professor of the History of Religion at Harvard University in the United States (as successor to George Foot Moore), where he remained the rest of his life. At 28, he was the youngest full professor at Harvard in half a century. As a guest lecturer, he held lectures at various universities, such as Harvard, Trinity College in Dublin (Donnellan Lecturer, 1931), King's Chapel in Boston, and University of Aberdeen (Gifford Lecturer, 1939 and 1946).

As a scholar of religion, Nock was of international importance, as evidenced not only by his extensive work as a guest lecturer, but also by his membership in numerous academies. He was a corresponding member of the British Academy, the American Academy of Arts and Sciences (1932), the Prussian Academy of Sciences (from 1937), the German Archaeological Institute (from 1937), the Bavarian Academy of Sciences (from 1938), and the American Philosophical Society from 1941. He also received a doctorate from the University of Birmingham (Doctor of Letters in 1934) and an honorary doctorate from both the Sorbonne in Paris (1950) and the Jewish Theological Seminary of America in New York (1960). He was an editor of the Harvard Theological Review from 1930 until his death.

Nock believed that religion was an important subject to be studied, saying "The term religion must be regarded as embracing all thought and language and action which man directs towards the unknown forces around him. It includes those proceedings and attitudes which can technically be classified as magical as well as religious; it includes much which later ripens into philosophy and science." To this end, he advocated the creation of a doctoral degree in the History and Philosophy of Religion at Harvard in order to better prepare students to teach the subject of religion. The degree program was implemented in October 1934. As a member of the steering committee created to guide the creation of the doctorate, Nock ensured that it would include the study of all manner of religious beliefs, from ancient Greek and Roman to Jewish and Indian. This comparative study of world religions eventually became the main focus of the degree, following a review in the 1950s.

== Death ==
After a week of illness, Nock died on 11 January 1963 in Cambridge, Massachusetts.

== Works ==
- Sallustius ‘Concerning the Gods and the Universe’, with Prolegomena and Translation, editor, (Cambridge: Cambridge University Press, 1926).
- Conversion (Oxford: Clarendon Press, 1933).
- St. Paul (London: Butterworth, 1938).

== Bibliography ==
- Nock, Arthur Darby (2013) [1926]. Sallustius: Concerning the Gods and the Universe. ISBN 978-1107645035.
- A. E. Rawlinson, ed. (1928). "Early Gentile Christianity and Its Hellenistic Background". Essays on the Trinity and the Incarnation. London: Longmans, Green and Co., Ltd.
- Nock, Arthur Darby (October 1930). "The Diis Electa: A Chapter in the Religious History of the Third Century". Harvard Theological Review. 23 (4): 251–74. doi:10.1017/S0017816000002844. S2CID 162996789.
- Conversion: The Old and the New in Religion from Alexander the Great to Augustine of Hippo. Oxford: Oxford University Press. 1933. OCLC 231136.
- St. Paul. London: Harper & Brothers. 1938. OCLC 613423.
- Nock, Arthur Darby (January 1939). "A Feature of Roman Religion". Harvard Theological Review. 32 (1): 83–96. doi:10.1017/S001781600002160X. JSTOR 1508073. S2CID 162753898.
- Nock, Arthur Darby (October 1940). "Orphism or Popular Philosophy". Harvard Theological Review. 33 (4): 301–15. doi:10.1017/S0017816000018800. JSTOR 1508056. S2CID 170392558.
- Zeph Stewart, ed. (1972). Essays on Religion and the Ancient World. Harvard University Press. ISBN 978-0674021136.
