= Jean-Pierre Mahé =

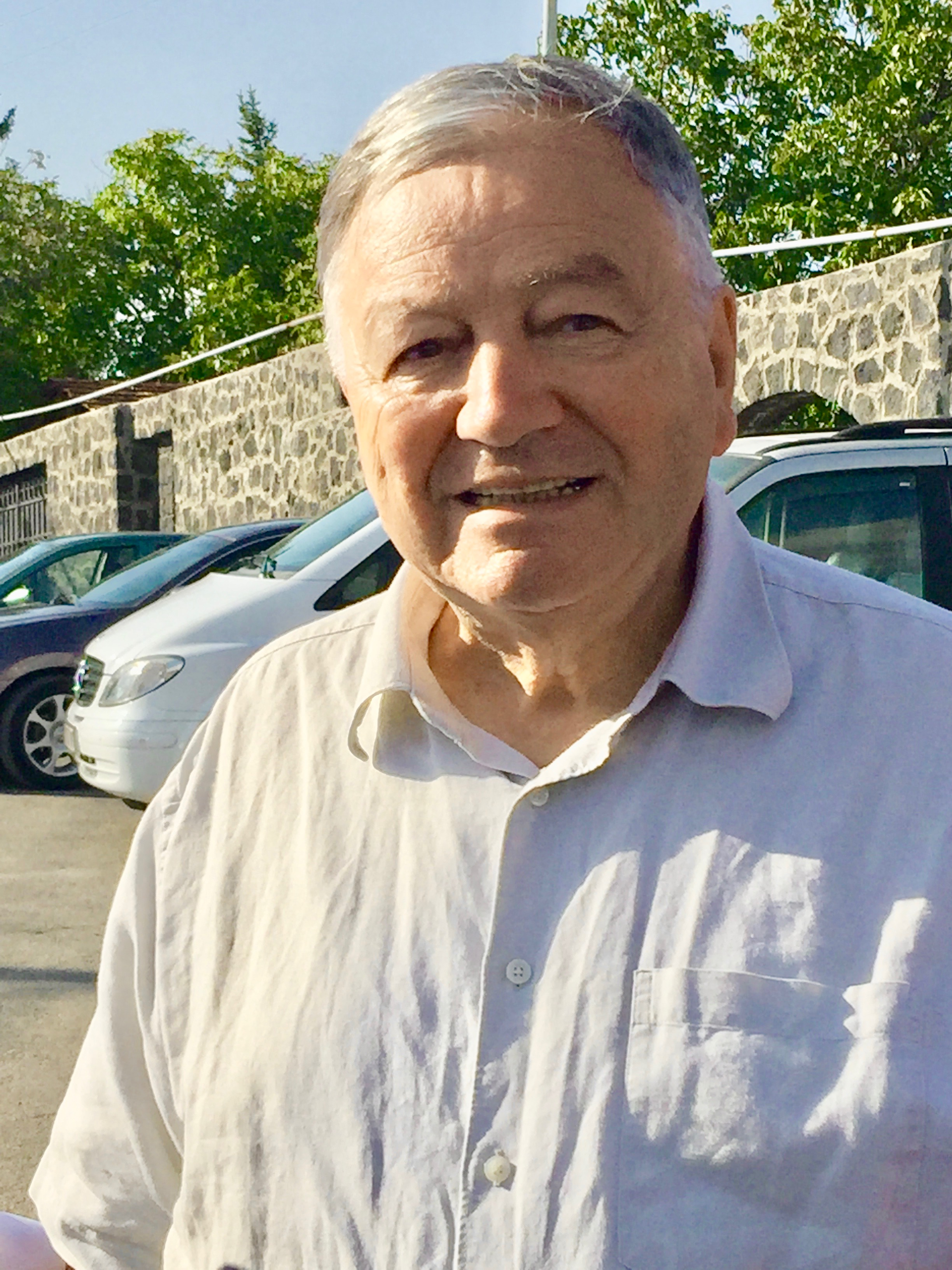

Jean-Pierre Mahé (French pronunciation: [ʒɑ̃ pjɛʁ mae], born 21 March 1944, Paris) is a French orientalist, philologist and historian of Caucasus, and a specialist of Armenian studies.

== Bibliography ==
- 1978: Hermès en Haute-Égypte, t. 1 : Les textes hermétiques de Nag Hammadi et leurs parallèles grecs et latins (Bibliothèque copte de Nag Hammadi, textes 3), Québec (PUL), 171 p. in 8°
- 1982: Hermès en Haute-Égypte, t. 2 : Le fragment du Discours parfait et les Définitions hermétiques arméniennes (Bibliothèque copte de Nag Hammadi, textes 7), Québec-Louvain (PUL, Peeters), L + 565 p. in 8°
- 1985: Le livre arménien à travers les âges, with Raymond Haroutioun Kevorkian, Catalogue de l'Exposition Marseille 1985 : Le livre arménien à travers les âges.
- 1986: Catalogue des « incunables » arméniens, 1511-1695 ou Chronique de l'imprimerie arménienne, with Raymond Haroutioun Kevorkian, P. Cramer, Geneva.
- 1988: Arménie : 3000 ans d'histoire, avec Raymond Haroutioun Kevorkian, Maison arménienne de la jeunesse et de la culture.
- 1992: Cave of Treasures (introduction, traduction du géorgien et notes), CSCO 527, Louvain (Peeters), XL + 120 p. in 8°
- 1993: La sagesse de Balahvar, une vie christianisée du Bouddha (introduction, translation from Georgian and notes; with A. Mahé), Paris (Gallimard, Connaissance de l’Orient 60), 156 p. in 16°
- 1993: Moïse de Khorène, Histoire de l’Arménie (introduction, translation from Armenian and notes; with A. Mahé), Paris (Gallimard, L’Aube des peuples), 455 p. in 8°
- 1993: Histoire du Christianisme, T. IV, Évêques, moines et empereurs, Desclée de Brouwer
- 1996: Le Témoignage véritable (introduction, texte copte, translation and notes; with A. Mahé), Bibliothèque copte de Nag Hammadi, textes 23, Québec-Louvain (Peeters), XVIII + 250 p. in 8°
- 1997: Des Parthes au Califat : quatre leçons sur la formation de l'identité arménienne, with Nina G. Garsoyan, De Boccard.
- 1997: From Byzantium to Iran. Armenian Studies in Honour of Nina G. Garsoïan (with R.W. Thomson), Atlanta (Scholars Press), 523 p. in 8°
- 1999: The Way of Hermes (with C. Salaman et D. van Oyen), London (Duckworth); 4th paperback edition in the U.S., Rochester, Vermont, 2004, 124 p. in 16°
- 2000: Grégoire de Narek, Tragédie (introduction, translation from Arménien and notes, with A. Mahé), CSCO 584, Louvain (Peeters), 838 p. in 8°
- 2001: Le nouveau manuscrit sinaïtique N Sin 50 (facsimile and introduction by Z. Aleksidzé; French translation and complementary notes by J.-P. Mahé), CSCO 586, Louvain (Peeters), 286 p. in 8°
- 2001: Melchisédek (introduction and translation by J.-P. Mahé; Coptic text established by W.P. Funk; commentary by Cl. Gianotto), Bibliothèque copte de Nag Hammadi, textes 28, Québec-Louvain (Peeters), XX + 190 p. in 8°
- 2004: Grégoire de Narek et le Livre de lamentation (with A. Mahé), Erévan (éditions Naïri), VIII + 326 p. in 16° (in Armenian)
- 2004: Et l'Arménie devint chrétienne, with Jean-Varoujean Gureghian, Éditions de Paris
- 2004: Le Livre des Canons arméniens (Kanonagirk' Hayoc). Église, Droit et Société en Arménie du IVe au VIIIe, with Aram Mardirossian, Peeters.
- 2005: L’Arménie à l’épreuve des siècles (with A. Mahé), Paris (Gallimard, Découvertes Gallimard/Histoire 464), 160 p. in 16°
- 2006: Saint Grégoire de Narek, théologien et mystique (with B.L. Zekiyan), Actes du colloque international, 20–22 January 2005 (ACO 275), Rome (Pontificio Istituto Orientale), 390 p. in 8°
- 2007: Paroles à Dieu de Grégoire de Narek (introduction, translation and commentary; with A. Mahé), Paris (Peeters, La Procure), 486 p. in 16°
- 2007: Écrits gnostiques. La Bibliothèque de Nag Hammadi, under the direction of J.-P. Mahé and P.-H. Poirier, Paris (Gallimard, La Pléiade), LXXXVII + 1830 p. in 16°
- 2012: Histoire de l'Arménie (with Annie Mahé), Paris (Perrin, Pour l'Histoire), 745 p.
- 2014: Trésor des fêtes. Hymnes et odes de Grégoire de Narek (introduction, translation and notes, with Annie Mahé), Paris (Peeters), 295 p.

== See also ==
- History of Armenia
