= Tage Lindbom =

Swedish politician and conservative philosopher (1909–2001)

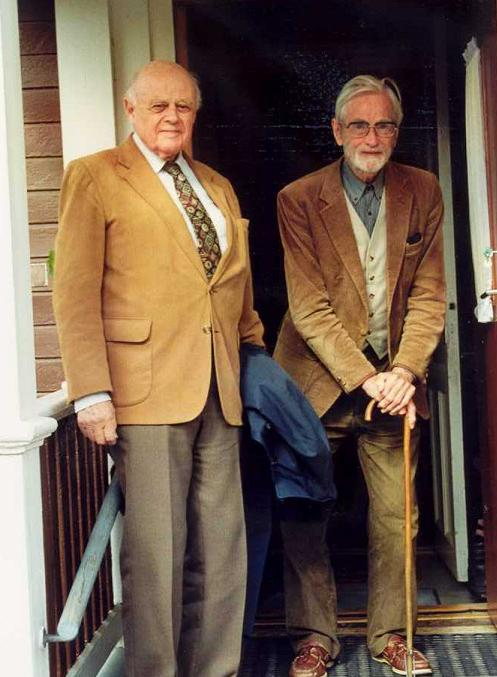
Tage Lindbom and Kurt Almqvist.

Tage Leonard Lindbom (24 October 1909 – 30 September 2001) was a mystic and conservative philosopher, who early in his life was the party theoretician and director of the archives of the Swedish Social Democratic Party 1938–1965.

He served on public boards and commissions dealing with cultural questions, including the executive board of the Royal Opera. He later converted to Islam. He became a representative of the Traditional School and the Perennial philosophy. Lindbom has been called "the grand old man" of Swedish conservativism and is the author of more than 20 books on philosophy and religion. He was a contributor to the quarterly journal, Studies in Comparative Religion, which dealt with religious symbolism and the Traditionalist perspective.

Since the early 1960s Lindbom was a disciple of the Swiss metaphysician Frithjof Schuon. Lindbom had in his later years an inner group of spiritual students in Sweden and is the author of the first esoteric commentary on the Koran in Swedish, entitled Encounter with the Koran.

== Writings in English ==
- The Tares and the Good Grain: Or, The Kingdom of Man at the Hour of Reckoning (transl. of Agnarna och vetet from the French by Alvin Moore, Jr.), Mercer University Press (UK), 1982, ISBN 978-0-86554-079-8 / 0865540799.
- The Myth of Democracy (transl. of Demokratin är en myt), Wm B Eerdmans Publishing Co, 1996, ISBN 0-8028-4064-7 / 0-8028-4064-7.
- "Lucifer" (transl. of chapter from Bortom teologin), Every Branch in Me: Essays on the Meaning of Man, ed. Barry McDonald, World Wisdom, Bloomington, 2002. ISBN 0-941532-39-9 / 978–0941532396. Also published in Religion of the Heart: Essays Presented to Frithjof Schuon on His Eightieth Birthday, eds. Seyyed Hossein Nasr and William Stoddart, Washington D.C., 1991.
- ""Virtue and Morality"". (transl. of chapter from Mellan himmel och jord), Studies in Comparative Religion, Vol. 9, No. 4. (Autumn, 1975). Also publ. in The Underlying Religion: An Introduction to the Perennial Philosophy, eds. Martin Lings and Clinton Minnaar, World Wisdom, Bloomington, 2007. ISBN 978-1-933316-43-7.
- ""1789: Dream and Reality"" (PDF)., Modern Age, Vol. 34, No. 4 (Summer 1992), p. 295-302.
- ""Frithjof Schuon and Our Times"" (PDF)., Sophia: The Journal of Traditional Studies, Vol. 4, No. 2, 1998, p. 78–90.

== Books in French ==
- L'ivraie et le bon grain ou Le royaume de l'homme à l'heure des échéances, trad. du Suédois par Roger du Pasquier (transl. of Agnarna och vetet), Milano, 1976.

== Books in German ==
- Atlantis : Idee und Wirklichkeit des Sozialismus (transl. of Efter Atlantis), Frankfurt am Main, 1955.

== Books in Spanish ==
- "La semilla y la cizaña: el reino del hombre al término del plazo; vérsión castellana de Alejandro Corniero Fernández-Baños" (PDF). (transl. of Agnarna och vetet), Madrid, 1980.

== Books in Portuguese ==
- O Mito da Democracia (transl. of Demokratin är en myt), São Paulo, Ibrasa, 2006.

== Books in Turkish ==
- Başaklar ve Ayrık Otları Modernliğin Sahte Kutsalları (transl. of Agnarna och vetet), İnsan Yayınları, Istanbul, 1997, 2003.
- Demokrasi miti (transl. of Demokratin är en myt), İnsan Yayınları, Istanbul, 1998. Transl. Ömer Baldik. ISBN 975-574-225-5

== Works in Swedish ==
- Efter Atlantis, Stockholm, 1951.
- Sancho Panzas väderkvarnar, Stockholm, 1962.
- Otidsenliga betraktelser, Stockholm, 1968.
- Mellan himmel och jord, Stockholm, 1970.
- Agnarna och vetet, Stockholm, 1974.
- Myt i verkligheten : en studie i marxism, Uppsala, 1977.
- Människoriket : Tankar om Västerlandets sekularisering, Uppsala, 1978.
- Jakobs dröm, Stockholm, 1978.
- Är religionen en socialutopi?, Borås, 1980.
- Riket är ditt, Stockholm, 1981.
- Tankens vägar, Borås, 1982.
- Omprövning, Borås, 1983.
- Den gyllene kedjan : falsk och äkta gnosis, Borås, 1984.
- Roosevelt och det andra världskriget, Borås, 1985.
- Bortom teologin, Borås, 1986.
- Fallet Tyskland, Borås, 1988.
- Mystik, Borås, 1990.
- Demokratin är en myt, Borås, 1991.
- Före solnedgången, Borås, 1993.
- Ett är nödvändigt, Borås, 1994.
- Modernismen, Borås, 1995.
- Konservatism i vår tid : Åtta idéhistoriska essäer, Borås, 1996.
- Västerlandets framväxt och kris, Skellefteå, 1999.
- I Frithjof Schuons fotspår, introduction by Ashk Dahlén, Stockholm, 2003 ISBN 91-518-4138-X
- "Möte med Koranen", Minaret, No. 4/2002, No. 1–2/2003, No. 3–4/2003, No. 1–2/2004
- "Ljus i mörkret", Minaret, 2004, No. 3–4.

== See also ==
- Traditional School
- Frithjof Schuon
- Kurt Almqvist
- René Guénon
- Seyyed Hossein Nasr
- Ivan Aguéli
- Ashk Dahlén
- William Stoddart
- Whitall Perry
