= Time and Eternity =

Time and Eternity may refer to:

- Time and Eternity (book)
- Time and Eternity (video game)

== See also ==
- Between Time and Eternity
- Time (disambiguation)
- Eternity (disambiguation)
