= Bernard Philip Kelly =

British philosopher (1907–1958)

Bernard Philip Kelly (April 25, 1907—November 2, 1958) was an English Catholic layman who worked in a bank, raised a large family, and regularly penned, over 25 years, philosophical essays and book reviews for the Dominican journal Blackfriars. His friendship with foremost British Thomists and leading distributists of his day, and with the Indian scholar Ananda Coomaraswamy—along with his love for the poetry of Gerard Manley Hopkins—permitted his short life to become the matrix of a rich body of writings.

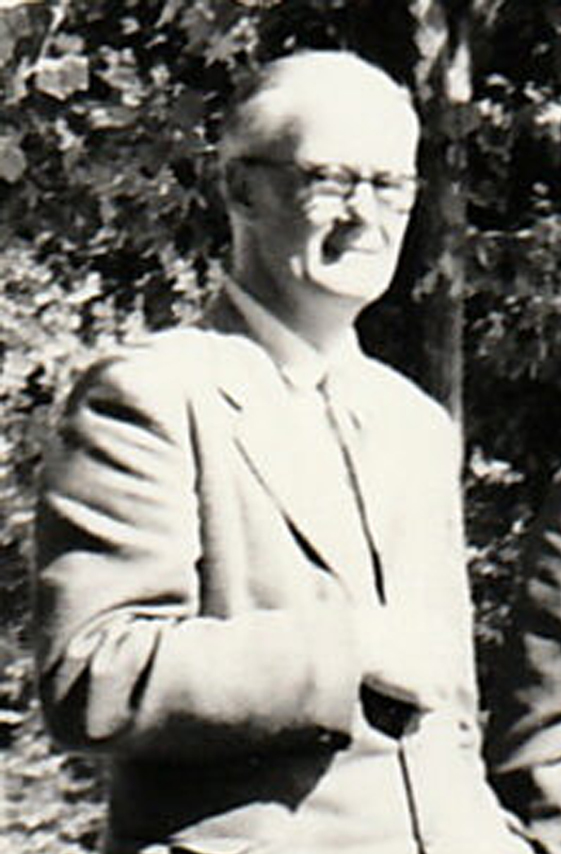
Bernard Kelly in the 1950s.

== Works ==
Kelly's inspiration was drawn in part from scholastic philosophy and, in particular, the metaphysics of Thomas Aquinas. Among the themes developed in his writings were the social and economic theory of Distributism, reflections on the poetry of Gerard Manley Hopkins, the outlines of a critique of the modern world, and the development of an informed and Christian approach to Eastern religions. His seminal articles on Eastern philosophy and religion were among his last publications:

== See also ==
- Perennial philosophy
- Gerard Manley Hopkins
- Ananda Coomaraswamy
- William Stoddart
- Thomas Aquinas
- Angus Macnab
