= The Perennial Philosophy =

1945 book by Aldous Huxley

- First United Kingdom edition, 1946
- Author: Aldous Huxley
- Subject: Mysticism, theology
- Published: Harper & Brothers, 1945
- Publication place: United States, United Kingdom

Publisher's jacket blurb for the first United Kingdom edition

The Perennial Philosophy is a 1945 comparative study of mysticism by the British writer and novelist Aldous Huxley. Its title derives from the theological tradition of perennial philosophy.

== Context ==
The Perennial Philosophy was published in 1945 immediately after the Second World War by Harper & Brothers in the United States (1946 by Chatto & Windus in the United Kingdom). The jacket text of the British first edition explains:

The Perennial Philosophy is an attempt to present this Highest Common Factor of all theologies by assembling passages from the writings of those saints and prophets who have approached a direct spiritual knowledge of the Divine ...

The book offers readers, who are assumed to be familiar with the Christian religion and the Bible, a fresh approach employing Eastern and Western mysticism:

Mr. Huxley quotes from the Chinese Taoist philosophers, from followers of Buddha and Mohammed, from the Brahmin scriptures and from Christian mystics ranging from St John of the Cross to William Law, giving preference to those whose writings, often illuminated by genius, are unfamiliar to the modern reader.

The final paragraph of the jacket text states:

In this profoundly important work, Mr. Huxley has made no attempt to 'found a new religion'; but in analyzing the Natural Theology of the Saints, as he has described it, he provides us with an absolute standard of faith by which we can judge both our moral depravity as individuals and the insane and often criminal behaviour of the national societies we have created.

== Scope ==
In the words of poet and anthologist John Robert Colombo:

The Perennial Philosophy is essentially an anthology of short passages taken from traditional Eastern texts and the writings of Western mystics, organised by subject and topic, with short connecting commentaries. No specific sources are given. Paging through the index gives the reader (or non-reader) an idea of who and what Huxley has taken seriously. Here are the entries in the index that warrant two lines of page references or more:

Aquinas, Augustine, St. Bernard, Bhagavad-Gita, Buddha, Jean Pierre Camus, St. Catherine, Christ, Chuang Tzu, "Cloud of Unknowing", Contemplation, Deliverance, Desire, Eckhart (five lines, the most quoted person), Eternity, Fénelon, François de Sales, Godhead, Humility, Idolatry, St. John of the Cross, Knowledge, Lankavatara Sutra, William Law (another four lines), Logos, Love, Mahayana, Mind, Mortification, Nirvana, Perennial Philosophy (six lines, a total of 40 entries in all), Prayer, Rumi, Ruysbroeck, Self, Shankara, Soul, Spirit, "Theologia Germanica," Truth, Upanishads (six different ones are quoted), Will, Words.

== Style ==
Huxley chose less well-known quotations because "familiarity with traditionally hallowed writings tends to breed, not indeed contempt, but ... a kind of reverential insensibility, ... an inward deafness to the meaning of the sacred words." So, for example, Chapter 5 on "Charity" takes just one quotation from the Bible, combining it with less familiar sources:

"He that loveth not knoweth not God, for God is love."_{1 John iv}

"By love may He be gotten and holden, but by thought never."_{The Cloud of Unknowing}

"The astrolabe of the mysteries of God is love."_{Jalal-uddin Rumi}"

Huxley then explains: "We can only love what we know, and we can never know completely what we do not love. Love is a mode of knowledge ..."

Huxley is quite vague with his references: "No specific sources are given."

== Structure of the book ==
The book's structure consists of:

- A brief Introduction by Huxley.
- Twenty-seven chapters of quotations from sages and saints on specific topics such as truth, self-knowledge, silence, faith, and spiritual exercises, with "short connecting commentaries." The chapters are not grouped in any way though there is a kind of order from the nature of the Ground at the beginning, down to practical exercises at the end. The Acknowledgements list 27 books from which quotations have been taken.

== Critical reception ==
=== United States ===
The Perennial Philosophy was widely reviewed when first published in 1945, with articles appearing in Book Week, Booklist, The Christian Century, The Nation, The New Republic, The New Yorker, Saturday Review of Literature, Springfield Republican, New York Herald Tribune, and the Wilson Bulletin.

The New York Times wrote that, "Perhaps Mr. Huxley, in The Perennial Philosophy has, at this time, written the most needed book in the world." The Times described the book as an:

... anthology [that] is above all a masterpiece of discrimination.... Leibniz gave the name of the Perennial Philosophy to this theme. Mr. Huxley has systematised, and dealt with, its many-branching problems, perils and beatitudes.

The Times also stated that, "It is important to say that even an agnostic, even a behaviorist-materialist ... can read this book with joy. It is the masterpiece of all anthologies."

Similarly, forty years later Huston Smith, a religious scholar, wrote that, in The Perennial Philosophy:

Huxley provides us with the most systematic statement of his mature outlook. Its running commentary deals with many of the social implications of Huxley's metaphysics.

Not all the reception was so positive. Chad Walsh, writing in the Journal of Bible and Religion in 1948, spoke of Huxley's distinguished family background, only to continue:

The only startling fact, and the one that could not have been predicted by the most discerning sociologist or psychologist, is that in his mid-forties he was destined to turn also to mysticism, and that since his conversion he was to be one of a small group in California busily writing books to win as many people as possible over to the "perennial philosophy" as a way of life.

=== United Kingdom ===
In the United Kingdom, contemporary reviewers admired the comprehensiveness of Huxley's survey but questioned his other-worldliness and were hostile to his belief in the paranormal.

C. E. M. Joad wrote in New Statesman and Society that, although the book was a mine of learning and Huxley's commentary was profound, readers would be surprised to find that he had adopted a series of peculiar beliefs such as the curative power of relics and spiritual presences incarnated in sacramental objects. Joad stated that, if the argument of the book is correct, only those who have undergone the religious experiences upon which it is based are properly able to assess its worth. Further, he found that the book was dogmatic and intolerant, "in which pretty well everything we want to do is wrong". Finally, Joad asserted that Huxley's mistake was in his "intellectual whole-hoggery" and that he was led by ideas untempered by ordinary human experience.

In the journal Philosophy, the Anglican priest Rev. W. R. Inge remarked on the book's well chosen quotations and called it "probably the most important treatise we have had on mysticism for many years". He saw it as evidence that Huxley was now a mystical philosopher, which he regarded as an encouraging sign. Inge pointed out conflicts between religions and within religion and agreed that a rapprochement must be through mystical religion. However, he wondered if the book, with its transcendence of the personality and detachment from worldly concerns, might not be more Buddhist than Christian. He concluded his review by calling into question Huxley's belief in psychical phenomena.

=== Elsewhere ===
The Canadian author John Robert Colombo wrote that as a young man he, like many others in the 1950s, was swept away with enthusiasm for "the coveted volume":

Everyone interested in consciousness studies has heard of his study called The Perennial Philosophy. It bears such a prescient and memorable title. His use of the title has preempted its use by any other author, neuropsychologist, Traditionalist, or enthusiast for the New Age. The book so nobly named did much to romanticise the notion of "perennialism" and to cast into the shade such long-established timid Christian notions of “ecumenicism” (Protestants dialoguing with Catholics, etc.) or "inter-faith" meetings (Christians encountering non-Christians, etc.). Who would care about the beliefs of Baptists when one could care about the practices of Tibetans?

Colombo also stated that:

Painfully absent from these pages are Huxley's mordant wit and insights into human nature. It is as if his quicksilverish intelligence has been put on hold or has found itself in a deep freeze of his own making. When it comes to selecting short and sometimes long quotations, he is no compiler like John Bartlett of quotation fame, but he does find time to make a few deft personal observations.

Erwin Schrodinger, in his What is Life? The Physical Aspect of the Living Cell, described the book as "very appropriately" titled and "beautiful". He compared the contents of Huxley's book with what he had written in the chapter On Determinism and Free Will.

== Huxley's view of perennial philosophy ==
Huxley's Introduction to The Perennial Philosophy begins:

The metaphysic that recognises a divine Reality substantial to the world of things and lives and minds; the psychology that finds in the soul something similar to, or even identical with, divine Reality; the ethic that places man's final end in the knowledge of the immanent and transcendent Ground of all being—the thing is immemorial and universal. Rudiments of the Perennial Philosophy may be found among the traditionary lore of primitive peoples in every region of the world, and in its fully developed forms it has a place in every one of the higher religions. A version of this Highest Common Factor in all preceding and subsequent theologies was first committed to writing more than twenty-five centuries ago, and since that time the inexhaustible theme has been treated again and again, from the standpoint of every religious tradition and in all the principal languages of Asia and Europe.

In the next paragraph, Huxley summarises the problem more succinctly, saying: "Knowledge is a function of being." In other words, if you are not suited to knowing something, you do not know it. This makes knowing the Ground of All Being difficult, in Huxley's view. Therefore, he concludes his Introduction with:

If one is not oneself a sage or saint, the best thing one can do, in the field of metaphysics, is to study the works of those who were, and who, because they had modified their merely human mode of being, were capable of a more than merely human kind and amount of knowledge.

== See also ==
- Perennial philosophy (philosophia perennis)
- The Teachings of the Mystics – A book by Walter T. Stace with a similar thesis

== Publication data ==
- The Perennial Philosophy, 1945, Harper & Brothers
  - Harper Perennial 1990 edition: ISBN 0-06-090191-8
  - Harper Modern Classics 2004 edition: ISBN 0-06-057058-X
  - Audio Scholar 1995 audio cassette edition: ISBN 1-879557-29-0
