= Kurt Almqvist =

Swedish poet, intellectual and spiritual figure

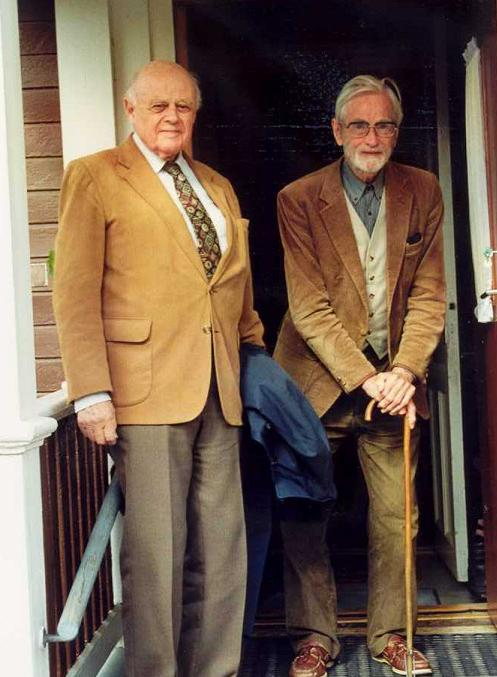
- Tage Lindbom (left) with Kurt Almqvist (right)
- Born: 11 March 1912; Falun, Sweden
- Died: 8 April 2001 (aged 89)

Kurt Almqvist (1912–2001) was a Swedish poet, intellectual and spiritual figure, representative of the Traditionalist School and the Perennial philosophy.

Almqvist was a lifelong disciple of the Swiss metaphysician and spiritual guide Frithjof Schuon. He came into close contact with the spiritual representatives of the Shadhiliyya order in the beginning of the 1940s. He introduced Schuon's teachings on spirituality and transcendent unity of religions in a number of publications. He also introduced the works of René Guénon in his writings. He was a frequent contributor to the quarterly journal, Studies in Comparative Religion, which dealt with religious symbolism and the Traditionalist perspective.

Almqvist received his doctorate in 1951 from Uppsala university on a dissertation concerning Guilhem Ademar, Poésies du troubadour Guilhem Adémar. He is the author of several essays and books in Swedish on religion and metaphysics, including four collections of poetry.

== Articles in English ==
- Temple of the Heart, Temple of the Body, Tomorrow, Summer 1964
- The Hidden Hierarchy of Existence, Sunrise, Vol. 22, Feb. 1973.
- Aspects of Teilhardian Idolatry, Studies in Comparative Religion, Vol. 12, No. 3 & 4, 1978.
- Reflexes in the Language of the Notion of the "Self", Studies in Comparative Religion, Vol. 13, No. 1 & 2, 1979.
- Every Branch in Me, Sunrise August / September 1982 & Studies in Comparative Religion, Vol. 15, No. 3 & 4, Middlesex, 1983. Also published in the anthology Every Branch in Me: Essays on the Meaning of Man, ed. Barry McDonald, Bloomington, 2002.
- The Three Circles of Existence, Studies in Comparative Religion, Vol. 17, No. 1 & 2, Middlesex, 1985.
- The Sun in the Tree, with Some Reflections on "Faith and Works", Religion of the Heart: Essays Presented to Frithjof Schuon on His Eightieth Birthday, eds. Seyyed Hossein Nasr and William Stoddart, Washington D.C., 1991.

== Works in French ==
- Poésies du troubadour Guilhem Adémar / publiées avec introduction, notes et glossaires par Kurt Almqvist (dissertation), Uppsala: Almqvist & Wiksell, 1951
- La Fontaine de la Croix; Le Nénuphar Blanc (poems), Soleils No. 4 / 1963
- Temple du coeur, Temple du corps, Études Traditionnelles, No. 378-379, 1963.
- Les trois cercles de l'existence, Études Traditionnelles, No. 393, 1966.
- Aspects de l'idolâtrie teilhardienne, Études Traditionnelles, No. 409-410, 1968.
- Etre Soi-même, Études Traditionnelles, No. 470, 1980.

== Works in Hungarian ==
- Az ember – Az elfelejtett templom: A láthatatlan piramis. (Extract from Människan: det glömda templet.) Ford. Szelényi Lajos. Tradíció évkönyv, (Debrecen) 2003, 9–21.
- A dolgok kapuin át. Öt meditáció. (Poems from Genom tingens portar: meditationer) Ford. Szelényi Szentjóbi Annamária. Tradíció évkönyv, (Debrecen) 2003, 211–212.
- Az ember két énje. ["The Two Selves of Man".] Ford. Szelényi Lajos. Tradíció évkönyv, (Debrecen) 2005, 75-90.

== Books in Swedish ==
- Vallfärd till mitten: dikter, Stockholm, 1945.
- Den glömda dimensionen, Stockholm, 1959.
- Gryningen är pärlemor: dikter, Stockholm, 1959.
- Ögonblick : en lyrisk årsrunda, Stockholm, 1964.
- Livklädnaden som revs sönder, Stockholm, 1967.
- Tidlös besinning i besinningslös tid, Ur Frithjof Schuons verk, Stockholm, 1973.
- I tjänst hos det Enda: ur René Guénons verk, Stockholm, 1977.
- Människan: det glömda templet, Hudiksvall, 1984.
- Himmelsstegen: om människans möjlighet att finna en väg till Gud, Delsbo, 1986.
- Genom tingens portar: meditationer, Delsbo, 1989.
- Ordet är dig nära: om uppenbarelsen i hjärtat och i religionerna, Delsbo, 1994.

== See also ==
- Frithjof Schuon
- Tage Lindbom
- Seyyed Hossein Nasr
- Ivan Aguéli
