= Otto Willmann =

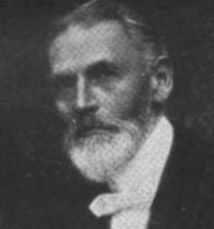
Otto Willmann

Otto Willmann (24 April 1839, Polnisch Lissa – 1 July 1920, Leitmeritz) was a German philosopher and educator, in the tradition of Johann Friedrich Herbart.

== Life ==
A devout Catholic, Willmann was the leading German Catholic scholar in education of his time. In 1862, he received his doctorate from the University of Berlin with the dissertation De figuris grammaticis. His teachers at Berlin included Friedrich Adolf Trendelenburg.

Willmann taught at the German University of Prague from 1872 until 1905. Willmann was a contributor to the Catholic Encyclopedia. In the history of ideas, he is also known for rediscovering Agostino Steuco's work De perenni philosophia.

Willmann was married to Franziska Biller, with whom he had four children. His daughter Charlotte married the publisher Hermann Herder.
