= Whitall Perry =

Comparative religions scholar

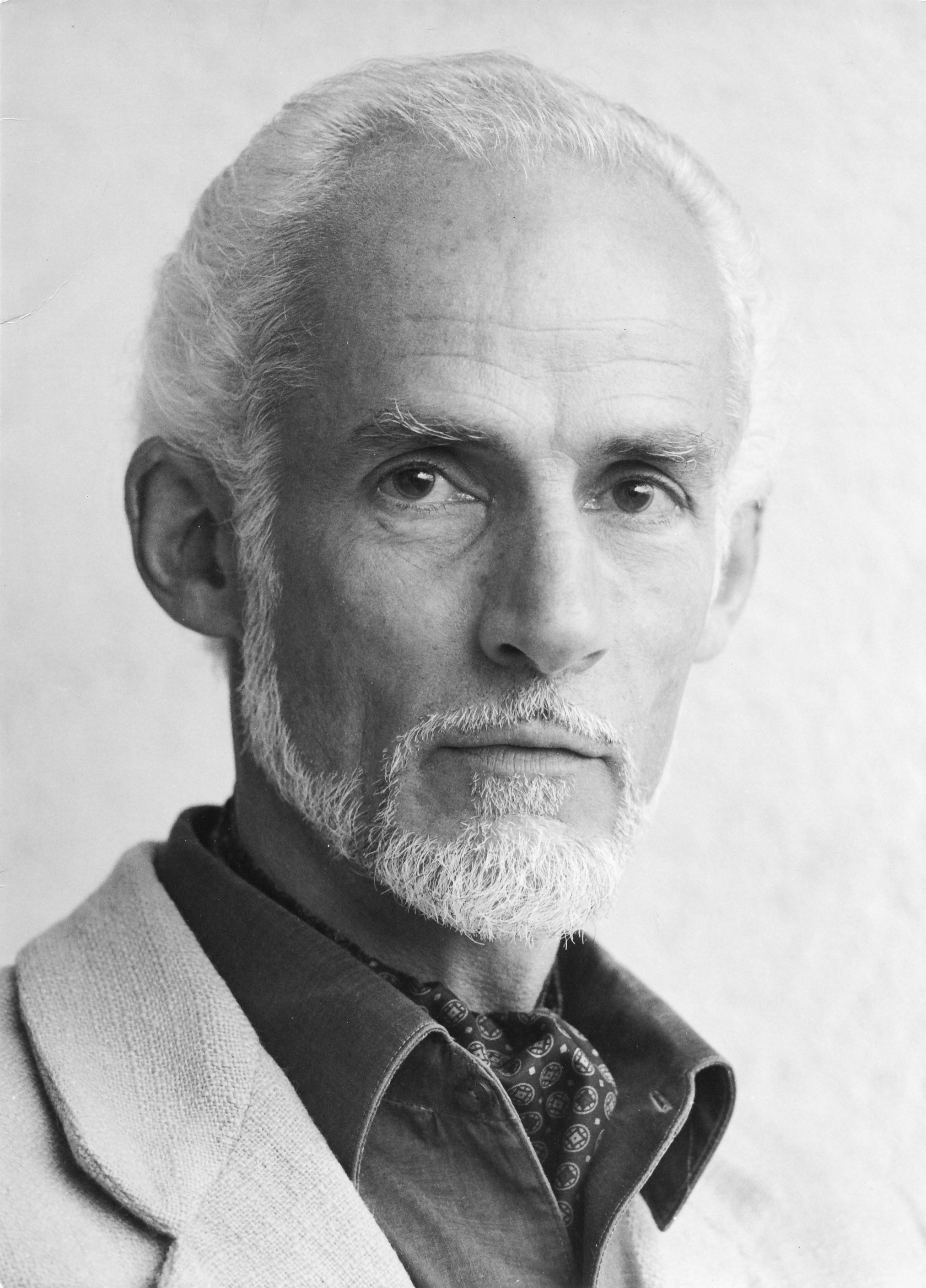
- Born: Whitall Nicholson Perry; January 19, 1920; Belmont, Massachusetts, U.S.
- Died: November 18, 2005 (aged 85); Bloomington, Indiana, U.S.

Academic background
- Influences: Rene Guenon, Frithjof Schuon, Titus Burkhardt, Martin Lings, Seyyed Hossein Nasr

Academic work
- School or tradition: Traditionalism, Perennial Philosophy
- Main interests: Esoterism, Traditionalism, Perennial Philosophy
- Notable works: A Treasury of Traditional Wisdom

Whitall Nicholson Perry (January 19, 1920 - November 18, 2005) was an American author born in Belmont, Massachusetts, member of the Perennialist School, which is based primarily on the work of René Guénon, Ananda Coomaraswamy and Frithjof Schuon. Perry's major opus, A Treasury of Traditional Wisdom, is a compilation of thousands of quotations from all the great religious and esoteric traditions, supported by commentaries.

== Biography ==
According to Harry Oldmeadow, Whitall Perry is one of the leading perennialist writers of American origin. Initially interested in Plato and Hindu Vedanta, he traveled to the East before settling in Cairo in 1946 with his wife. There he developed close ties with the French metaphysician René Guénon, which led him to join the tariqa of Frithjof Schuon.

He left Cairo in 1952, a year after Guénon's death, and settled in Lausanne, Switzerland, near Schuon, of whom he became a close associate. When Schuon emigrated to the United States in 1980, Perry and his wife followed him. Perry died in 2005 in Bloomington, Indiana.

== Work ==
The metaphysician and art historian Ananda Coomaraswamy, whom Perry had known while studying at Harvard, had launched the idea of an encyclopedia that would collect wisdom from around the world. (Note: "The time is coming when a Summa of the Philosophia Perennis will have to be written, impartially based on all orthodox sources whatever." Ananda Coomaraswamy .) It was Perry who accomplished this monumental task, which took him 17 years, and which resulted in the publication in 1971 of A Treasury of Traditional Wisdom. This collection of more than 1,100 pages gathers thousands of quotations from all the great religious and esoteric traditions, supported by commentaries referring largely to the writings of Guénon, Coomaraswamy, and Schuon.

In 1978, an English publisher commissioned him to write a study on George Gurdjieff in order to "help clear up the confusion surrounding the Armenian thaumaturgist"; the critical work was entitled Gurdjieff in the Light of Tradition. Perry is also the author of The Widening Breach: Evolutionism in the Mirror of Cosmology (1995) and Challenges to a Secular Society (1996), a collection of essays on the pseudo-mysticism generated by drugs, reincarnation, psychotherapy, modern gurus, Shakespeare, cosmology, and psychology.

Perry has also published some twenty articles in the English journal Studies in Comparative Religion on a variety of metaphysical and religious topics.

== Bibliography ==
- Challenges to a Secular Society. Oakton, Virginia: Foundation for Traditional Studies, 1996, ISBN 978-096299843-0.
- Gurdjieff in the Light of Tradition. Bedfont, London: Perennial Books, 1978; reed. Ghent, New York: Sophia Perennis, 2002, ISBN 978-090058875-4.
- A Treasury of Traditional Wisdom. New York: Simon and Schuster, 1971; reed., preface by Huston Smith, San Francisco: Harper & Row, 1986; reed. Louisville, Kentucky: Fons Vitae, 2000; reed. as The Spiritual Ascent: A Compendium of the World's Wisdom, Louisville, Kentucky: Fons Vitae, 2008, ISBN 978-188775204-6.
- The Widening Breach: Evolutionism in the Mirror of Cosmology. San Francisco: Harper & Row, 1995, ISBN 978-187019613-0.
- The Essential Whitall Perry, foreword by William Stoddart, editor's preface by Harry Oldmeadow. Bloomington, Indiana: World Wisdom, 2024, ISBN 978-1-936597-78-9.

== See also ==
- Perennial Philosophy
- Traditionalist School
- Titus Burckhardt
- Ananda Coomaraswamy
- Martin Lings
- William Stoddart
- Angus Macnab
- Bernard Philip Kelly
