= Cosmism =

Cosmism may refer to:

- A philosophical position from the writings of Hugo de Garis
- An ideology espoused by Ben Goertzel in A Cosmist Manifesto: Practical Philosophy for the Posthuman Age
- Russian cosmism, a philosophical and cultural movement in Russia in the early 20th century

== See also ==
- Cosmicism, a literary philosophy by H. P. Lovecraft
- Acosmism
