= Hjalmar Sundén =

Swedish psychologist

Hjalmar Sundén (1908–1993) was a Swedish psychologist, known for his contributions to the psychology of religion and for his development of "role theory".

== Biography ==
Sundén studied in Paris, where he interviewed the French philosopher Henri Bergson. Bergson's philosophy of religion was to become the subject of Sunden's doctorate, after he had studied theology at the University of Uppsala (he received his doctorate in 1940). After receiving his doctorate, Sundén, unable to obtain a university post for some time, taught psychology and religion at various schools in the Stockholm region.

In 1959, Sunden published details of his role theory in Religionen och rollen. This book helped Sundén to obtain a university chair. He was the first person to occupy a chair in the Psychology of Religion at the University of Uppsala and first person to hold such a post in any Nordic country.

== Role theory ==
Sundén's role theory states that as people learn from sacred texts, they identify with certain roles in these texts, so that they may begin to see ordinary experience as a religious experience.

Sundén's role theory may be considered a social constructivist approach to religious experience. His approach stands in contrast to essentialist approaches such as the perennial psychology of Robert K.C. Forman.

== Influence ==
Sundén's role theory has been influential in the psychology of religion as taught by the Dutch psychologist Jan van der Lans. His student Nicolette Hijweege used Sundén's role theory for PhD-research on conversion among Dutch reformed Christians.

In 1987, the Journal for the Scientific Study of Religion launched a special issue on Sundén's role theory. An account of his work in the English language was prepared by his Finnish supporters, Holm and Belzen (1995).

Sundén's role theory as applied to mystical experience is discussed by Wulff (2000). Wulff notes a study by Lars (1987), in which people were undergoing Zen training were more likely to report a mystical experience if they had a religious frame of reference. Wulff also notes criticisms of Sunden's role theory, noting how it fails to explain how mystical experience arises in the first place.

Spilka e.a. mention Sundén's role theory as a promising approach for the psychology of religion.

== Writings (selection) ==
- Gud - ödet - slumpen 1947
- Personligheten och det gemensamma bästa / Jacques Maritain 1949
- Rudolf Steiner. En bok om antroposofin 1962
- Religionen och rollerna: ett psykologiskt studium av fromheten 1959
- Kristusmeditationer i Dag Hammarskjölds Vägmärken 1966
- Älgskyttar, helgon och exegeter: några religionspsykologiska essäer 1969
- Den heliga Birgitta: ormungens moder som blev Kristi brud 1973
- Religionspsykologi: problem och metoder, with: Gustaf Ståhlberg 1974
- Mora-prosten mäster Jacob Boëthius syndabekännelse av år 1707: med en kort levernesbeskrivning och kommentar.
- Om synd och nåd, medveten strävan och omedvetet motstånd": ett fromhetsdokument från stormaktstiden 1977
- Persona och anima: en tillämpning av C. G. Jungs psykologi på sex författare: Karlfeldt, Strindberg, Camus, Lagerkvist, Heliga Birgitta, Moraprosten Jacob Boethius 1981
- Konungen och riket: om den gudomliga världsstyrelsen 1983
- "Glöm inte bort vad du har": religion - auktoritet: indiskt eller kristet? 1985
- Zen: historik, analys och betydelse 1995

== Sources ==
- Holm, N.G. & Belzen, J.A. (1995). Sundén's Role Theory: Impetus to Contemporary Psychology of Religion. Åbo: Åbo Akademi.
- Wulff, D. (2000). "Mystical Experience". In Cardena, E., Lynn, S.J. & Krippner, S. (eds.). Varieties of Anomalous Experience: Examining the Scientific Evidence. Washington, D.C.: American Psychological Association. ISBN 1-55798-625-8. pp 397ff.
- The special edition of Journal for the Scientific Study of Religion, Volume 26 (number 3) for 1987, which includes articles on Sundén's theory by people such as Kallstadt, Holm and Wikström.
