= Time and Eternity (book) =

Book by Walter Terence Stace

Time and Eternity: An Essay in the Philosophy of Religion
- Author: Walter Terence Stace
- Language: English
- Subject: Religion, Philosophy, Philosophy of Religion, Mysticism
- Published: 1952 by Princeton University Press
- Publication place: United States
- Pages: 169
- ISBN: 0837118670
- OCLC: 1142510
- Dewey Decimal: 201
- LC Class: BL51 .S6257
- Preceded by: Religion and the Modern Mind
- Followed by: Teachings of the Mystics

Time and Eternity - An Essay on the Philosophy of Religion (1st imp. Princeton New Jersey 1952, Princeton University Press, 169 pp) is a philosophy book written by Walter Terence Stace. At the time of writing, Stace was a professor of philosophy at Princeton University, where he had worked since 1932 after a 22-year career in the Ceylon Civil Service. Time and Eternity was one of his first books about the philosophy of religion and mysticism, after writing throughout most of the 1930s and 1940s that was influenced by phenomenalist philosophy.

In his introduction Stace writes that Time and Eternity is an attempt to set out the fundamental nature of religion, and to deal with the conflict between religion and naturalism. He explains that the basic idea set out in the book is that all religious thought is symbolic, and that his influences include Rudolf Otto, especially his Mysticism East and West, and Immanuel Kant. He says he was motivated to write the book in an attempt to add to the "other half of the truth which I now think naturalism [as espoused in his 1947 essay Man Against Darkness] misses".

The book begins by looking at religion, specifically God as non-being and as being, put by Stace as the negative and positive divine. Stace then defines two orders of being - time and eternity, which he says intersect in the moment of mystic illumination. He goes on to say that the nature of God or eternity is such that all religious language is symbolic and that it is necessarily subject to contradictions.

== Synopsis ==
The first chapter asks what religion is, stating that religious thought is contradictory, is rooted in intuition, and that God is fundamentally a mystery. The second and third chapters look at the negative divine - the characterisation of God as void, silence or non-being - which Stace maintains is an idea found in all religions. He maintains that mystical experience is shared by all mankind, it is only the theories about it that differ. On this point he says he is in agreement with Otto. In this experience the distinction between subject and object is overcome, indeed there is no difference between the experiencer and the experience.

"It is not that the mystic has an experience, even a direct vision, of God. For in that case God would be the object for the soul as subject. The distinction between God and the soul, as object and subject respectively, is wholly done away with. The soul passes into the being of God, becomes God, is God."

Stace then goes on to explain that all religions say that religious revelation is ineffable, because no words or concepts can be applied to God who is without qualities or predicates. Thus, God cannot be comprehended by the intellect, but is apprehended by intuition. "... it is of the very nature of intellect to involve the subject-object opposition. But in the mystic experience this opposition is transcended. Therefore the intellect is incapable of understanding it. Therefore it is incomprehensible, ineffable."

Stace then looks at the positive divine; he asks how concepts can be applied to that which is above all concepts and finds that all propositions about God are symbolical. He defines religious and non-religious symbolism as differing in two respects. Firstly, religious symbols cannot be translated into logical propositions because they refer to an (ineffable) experience rather than a proposition. Secondly, the relationship between the religious symbol and what is symbolised is one of evocation rather than "meaning", as meaning is a concept, which is absent in the mystical experience. "Yet in some way this symbolic language evokes in us some glimpse, some hint, seen dimly through the mists and fogs which envelop us, of that being who stands above all human thought and conception." He goes on to write that some of these symbols feel more appropriate than others (e.g. God is love not hate).

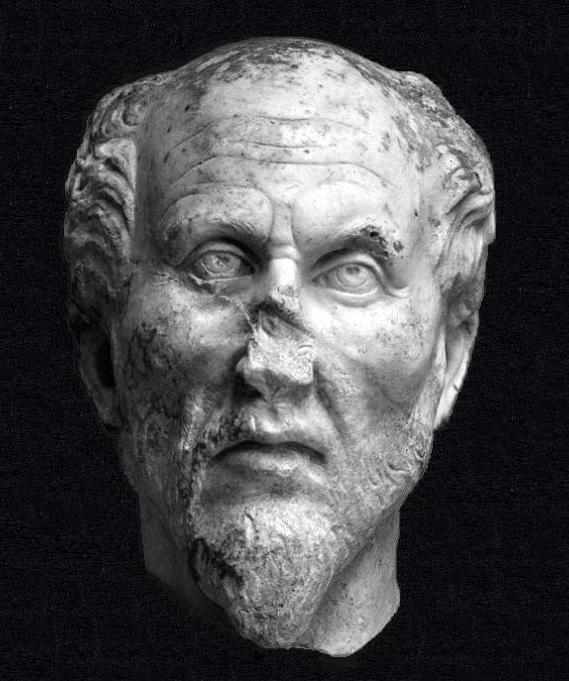
"Thus when Plotinus speaks of "the flight of the alone to the Alone,"... [this] evoke[s] in us a measure of the same experience which the author of them had."

Next Stace explains that there are two orders of being: time (or the world) and eternity (or God), and these intersect in the moment of mystic illumination. He maintains these orders are distinct, so one order cannot dictate to the other. Here he says that he agrees with Kant, who made a distinction between the world of phenomena and the noumenon, although he is critical of Kant’s disregard for mystical experience.

Looking at symbolism in religion, Stace states that there are two types of predicates applied to God: first, the ethically-neutral sort, such as God being mind, power or personhood. Secondly, the ethical kind, where he is love, mercy, or righteousness. He explains that the former qualities are justified by an appeal to a hierarchy of being, and the latter to a hierarchy of value. In both cases the more adequate symbol are those that are higher in each hierarchy. In rooting symbolism in hierarchies, Stace explicitly states he is in opposition to Otto who thought religious symbolism was based on analogy between the numen and qualities found in the natural world.

Stace next looks at religion’s claims to truth. He draws an analogy between mystical illumination and aesthetic truth, as the truths of both rest on revelation rather than reason. "Either you directly perceive beauty, or you do not. And either you directly perceive God in intuition, or you do not." Further, he maintains the arguments of both mystics and naturalists in denying each other's positions are invalid, as they concern different realities.

"What is the meaning of the metaphor of intersection? This intersection means precisely what the eternal moment is experienced to be. It is one and the same human consciousness which experiences both the temporal or natural world and that eternal and infinite order which is disclosed in mystical illumination."

These separate spheres lead Stace to reflect on both proofs for God and acosmism. He writes that proofs and disproofs for God are equally false, as God is only accessible by intuition and not logic. "… the production by philosophers of proofs of the unreality of space, time, and the temporal world generally, is a direct result of their mistaking of their mystical propositions for factual propositions." Further, proofs of God actually harm religion as they make him a part of the natural order - a point on which he says that he agrees with Kant. Conversely acosmism (the denial of the reality of the world) has its root in the mystical moment, within which there is no other truth, God is the supreme reality and there is no naturalistic world. However, this is a symbolic truth, rather than a statement of fact. Its counterpart in naturalism is atheism, which denies the reality of God.

"The pure religious consciousness lies in a region which is forever beyond all proof or disproof. This is a necessary consequence of the "utterly other" character of God from the world, and of the "utterly other" character of the world from God. The eternal order is not the natural order, and the natural order is not the eternal order. The two orders intersect, but in the intersection each remains what it is. Each is wholly self-contained. Therefore, it is impossible to pass, by any logical inference, from one to the other. This at once precludes as impossible any talk either of the proof or disproof of religion."

In the final chapter Stace looks at mysticism and logic. He returns to the idea that theology and mystical philosophies (he gives the examples of Vedanta, Spinoza, Hegel, and Bradley) will always contain contradictions. Known as the doctrine of the Mystery of God, he maintains this is because the intellect is inherently incapable of understanding the Ultimate. All attempts to state the nature of the ultimate necessarily produce contradictions.

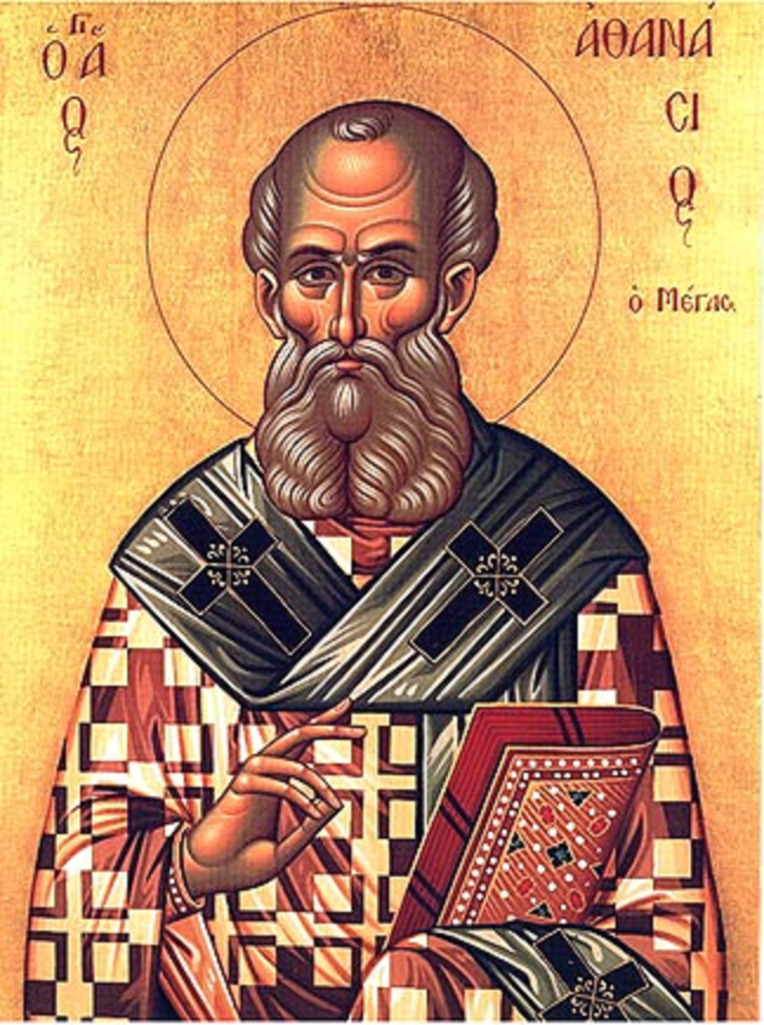
“The Upanishad says flatly that Brahman "is incomprehensible, for it cannot be comprehended". The creed of St. Athanasius agrees with the Upanishad: 'The Father incomprehensible, the Son incomprehensible, the Holy Ghost incomprehensible. . . . Yet not three incomprehensiblies, but one incomprehensible.'"

== Critical response ==
Virgil C Aldrich reviewed the book alongside Religion and the Modern Mind and The Gate of Silence, also by Stace and published in 1952. He points out that all three books mark a new direction for Stace who was previously best known as an empiricist and naturalist. For Aldrich this new intellectual interest results in a sharp dualism in both Stace’s personality and his thought. However, he writes that fortunately Stace’s philosophical background prevents him from supposing that scientific empiricism can confirm religious experience, indeed his religious philosophy is the sort “that a Hume or a Kant can consort with.” Aldrich argues that Stace's intellectual sophistication is most evident in his ideas about the negative divine, but his thought is liable to all the standard objections where he proposes notions of the positive divine and religious intuition. Specifically, the notion that religious language is evocative of the mystical experience is problematic, because it is difficult to determine what language is adequate without resorting to literal or abstract ideas. Rudolf Otto's notion of analogy, rejected by Stace, is more robust. Aldrich points out a contradiction in Stace's reliance on hierarchies of being and values to more adequately refer to God, as this implies continuity between the world and eternity, which Stace denies.

Julius Seelye Bixler reviewed the book twice, in 1952 and 1953. In his first review he wrote that he believed Stace was trying to have his cake and eat it with regards to the truth of both naturalism and mysticism. Bixler also wonders whether the revelation of God can really be free of concepts and thus whether time and eternity are utterly unrelated as Stace maintains. He identifies points in Stace's thought where there is continuity between these two states and mystical language does appear to refer to concepts. Finally he rejects the book's analogy of mystical experience to the evocative power of art, maintaining that art must be somewhat related to logic. Nonetheless, Bixler does concur that the book is a fascinating confessio fidei and personal statement. A year later, he reviewed Time and Eternity alongside Religion and the Modern Mind. As well as reiterating the points he had made earlier, Bixler judges the second book more favourably and recommends reading the two together to better understand the problems they address.

Stace was praised for his clarity and ambitious aims in Time and Eternity by Abraham Kaplan who believed the book was one of the best on the subject for many many years. He pointed out that the book's distinction between the orders of time and eternity owed much to Kant (which Stace himself acknowledged). Kaplan reflected that it was the book's emphasis placed on mysticism and a universal religious intuition that would be of particular interest to students of “Oriental and comparative philosophy”. The central idea upon which Stace's thought stands or falls, for Kaplan, is that religious language is evocative rather than descriptive. In this both religionists and naturalists will find problems. For the former, Stace can only account for the appropriateness of religious language by relying on ‘nearness’ to the divine rather than on resemblance, and this relies on ‘a vague panpsychism’ and levels of being in the manner of Samuel Alexander. While for the naturalist, Stace's system of religious symbolism is doomed to remain mysterious, because it does not allow religious metaphors to be translated literally and neither can it be said how they evoke the experience to which they refer.

Also noting the unachievable ambition of solving the conflict between naturalism and religion, Martin A Greenman, remarks that one must come to the book “with a certain mood”. Too critical a mood would blind the reader to its religious insights, while the sensitivity and depth of its philosophic insights would be lost if one were to approach it in a too enthusiastically religious mood. Greenman finishes by justifying Stace's philosophy to logical positivists by quoting from Wittgenstein's Tractatus: “My propositions are elucidatory in this way: he who understands me finally recognizes them as senseless, when he has climbed out through them, on them, over them….He must surmount these propositions: then he sees the world rightly” (6. 54.) Dorothy M. Emmet found issue with the notion that the mystical experience is the point of intersection between the temporal and eternal orders. She writes that there are difficulties in Stace defining these orders as two distinct “orders of being”, rather than just as a way of speaking, because this then means some statements about the temporal order are relevant to what is said about the eternal order and vice versa. Indeed, the interrelation between these two orders is difficult to maintain. She also questioned Stace's characterisation of mystical consciousness as being the same everywhere.

More recently, Maurice Friedman writes about the book in the context of the various attempts to find a universal essence - or perennial philosophy - within religion. He finds that Time and Eternity is a more systematic attempt at this than those proposed by Aldous Huxley or Ananda Coomaraswamy, but no more successful. For Friedman, the philosophy that Stace lays out in the book is derived from metaphysical speculation (that, like the ideas of Huxley and Coomaraswamy, is influenced by Vedanta), rather than mystical experience. Central to Friedman's critique is the notion that there is a vast gulf between the mystical experience which Stace defines as beyond thought, and his philosophical system built on this. He also mentions that mystics do not always agree on what experiences, symbols and philosophies are the closest to the divine.

The book has received more positive support however. Robert C Neville called Time and Eternity “the most sophisticated treatment of eternity and time in our century so far”. In his Thought: A Very Short Introduction, Tim Bayne says the book contains a “classic” discussion of ineffability. American writer Arthur Goldwag has said that the phrase "that than which there is no other" that he encountered in Time and Eternity was one of a number of factors that contributed to him giving up praying.
