= Mateus Soares de Azevedo =

Brazilian writer

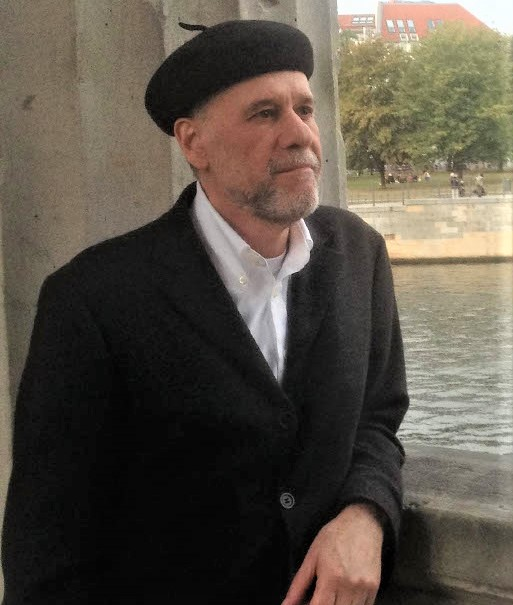
- 2019
- Born: 1959 (age 66–67); Belo Horizonte, Brazil
- Education: University of São Paulo; Pontifical Catholic University of São Paulo
- Occupations: author, translator
- Writing career
- Language: Portuguese
- Subjects: spirituality; religion; philosophy
- Notable works: Men of a Single Book: Fundamentalism in Islam, Christianity and Modern Thought; Ye shall know the truth: Christianity and the Perennial Philosophy
- Literary movement: Traditionalist School (perennialism)

Mateus Soares de Azevedo (born 24 January 1959) is a Brazilian writer. He has published books, essays and articles on the perennial philosophy and the mystical and esoteric themes within Christianity and Islam.

== Life ==
Mateus Soares de Azevedo was born in Belo Horizonte in 1959 and spent his early childhood there. In São Paulo – where he now lives – he studied modern languages at the University of São Paulo, and journalism at the Pontifical Catholic University of that same city. He also studied international relations at George Washington University, USA, and obtained a master's in history of religions from the University of São Paulo.

His profession as a writer, journalist, editor and translator has prompted him to visit Europe in order to contact religious authorities, collect material for his books, and interview perennialist authors. In Europe, he examined the three main branches of Christianity, visiting Roman Catholic, Protestant, and Orthodox countries. He also traveled to Muslim countries in search of "direct contact with the Islamic reality".

== Work ==
Azevedo has written a number of books in Portuguese on comparative religion, the perennial philosophy, criticisms of the materialist mentality of the modern world, and the mystical and esoteric dimensions of Christianity and Islam.

He also published many essays on those subjects in Brazilian newspapers and magazines including O Estado de S. Paulo, Folha de S.Paulo and O Globo. Some of them have been translated into English, French, Spanish, and Italian, and published in spirituality- and ideas-oriented publications including Sophia (USA), Sacred Web (Canada), Dossiers H (Switzerland) and Ultreia (France). He is also the translator into Portuguese of Frithjof Schuon, a Swiss metaphysician of the perennialist school, of Martin Lings, William Stoddart, C.S. Lewis and others.

In the Folha de São Paulo, professor Paulo Daniel Farah, in his review of 1 April 2006, reports that in A Inteligência da Fé ("The Intelligence of Faith"), Azevedo explains that, "according to perennial philosophy, religions are determined by Ideas, in the Platonic sense of the term, or perennial spiritual archetypes, which manifest themselves from time to time in the world of history and mutability. Christianity embodies one of these spiritual archetypes, just as Islam, Judaism and the other religions do...".

Men of a Single Book: Fundamentalism in Islam, Christianity and Modern Thought was described in the magazine Parabola as an analysis of what Azevedo calls "secular fundamentalism", in which he includes "Marxism, Freudian psychoanalysis, Jungian analytical psychology and science fundamentalism"; these, according to Azevedo, have significantly shaped the contemporary mindset. The book also discusses religious militant fundamentalism, as well as anti-religious fundamentalism, characterized by atheist writers such as Christopher Hitchens, Richard Dawkins and Sam Harris.

== Publications ==
Selected books

- Alchemy of Love: Sexuality & the Spiritual Life, Sophia Perennis, 2020, ISBN 978-159731183-0 (Note: Samuel Bendeck Sotillos: "A unique work, it explores the metaphysical underpinnings of sexuality in a way we rarely see today". The Critique Journal, Vol. 17, N° 1–2, 2021, pp. 99–101.)
- Men of a Single Book: Fundamentalism in Islam, Christianity and Modern Thought, World Wisdom, 2010, ISBN 978-193549318-1
- (pt) Ordens Sufis no Islã: Iniciação às confrarias esotéricas muçulmanas no Irã xiita e no mundo sunita, Polar, 2020, ISBN 978-85-867-7541-3
- (pt) O Livro dos Mestres, Ibrasa, 2016, ISBN 978-85-348-0363-2
- (pt) A Inteligência da Fé: Cristianismo, Islã e Judaísmo, Record/Nova Era, 2006, ISBN 978-85-7701-045-5

Selected articles and essays

- "Short answer to three militant atheists"
- "Frithjof Schuon & Sri Ramana Maharshi: a survey of the spiritual masters of the 20th Century"
- (pt) "A Ideologia do Estado Islâmico"
- (pt) "Outros Islãs"
- (pt) "Francisco 1 e a mitologia do concílio Vaticano 2"
- (pt) "Vaticano 2° se encerra com um dos seus ideólogos"
- (pt) "O Sermão da Montanha segundo a Filosofia Perene"

Selected translations into Portuguese

- Cartas do diabo ao seu aprendiz, C. S. Lewis.
- Para Compreender o Islão, Frithjof Schuon.
- A Arte Sagrada de Shakespeare, Martin Lings.
- O Sufismo, William Stoddart.
