= Agostino Steuco =

Italian humanist

Agostino Steuco (in Latin Agostinus Steuchus or Eugubinus; c. 1497 – 1548) was an Italian humanist, Old Testament scholar, Counter Reformation polemicist and antiquarian. He was born at Gubbio in Umbria. He discoursed on the subject of perennial philosophy and coined the term philosophia perennis.

== Ecclesiastical career ==
In 1513 he entered the congregation of the Order of the Augustinian Canons of San Salvatore of Bologna, taking up residence in the monastery of San Secundo, one of the order's houses in Gubbio. In 1524 he went to the mother cloister in Bologna, from where he briefly attended courses in Hebrew and rhetoric at the University of Bologna. In 1525 he was sent by his congregation to the Monastery of Sant' Antonio di Castello in Venice, where, due to his expertise in biblical languages and humanist textual criticism, he was placed in charge of the monastery's library, donated to the canons by Cardinal Domenico Grimani. Many of the collection's biblical, Hebrew, and philosophical works had once been owned by Pico della Mirandola.

=== Polemics against early Protestants ===
Over the next several years (1529–33) Steuco wrote a series of polemical works against Luther and Erasmus, the latter of whom he accused of helping to foment the Protestant Reformation against the Church. These works show Steuco's staunch support of the traditions and practices of the Church, including a strident defense of papal authority. Part of his output during this period included a major set of annotations on the Pentateuch, titled Veteris testamenti ad Hebraicam veritatem recognitio, in which he used Hebrew and Greek manuscripts from the Grimani Library to correct Jerome's Vulgate translation of the Old Testament text. When explaining the text, he never strayed from the literal and historical meaning. An interesting juxtaposition to this work of humanist biblical exegesis was a syncretic philosophical work that he wrote in this period, to which he gave the title Cosmopoeia.

His polemical and exegetical works attracted the notice of Pope Paul III, and in 1538 the pope made Steuco bishop of Chisamo on the island of Crete, and librarian of the papal collection of manuscripts and printed works in the Vatican. While he never visited his bishopric in Crete, Steuco did actively fulfill his role as Vatican Librarian until his death in 1548. While in Rome, he authored Old Testament annotations on the Psalms and Job, again relying heavily upon Hebrew sources to help annotate and correct the texts.

=== Christianity and classical philosophy ===
In 1540 he published a major work entitled De perenni philosophia, which attempted to show that many of the ideas expounded by the sages, poets, and philosophers from classical antiquity were in essential harmony with Christianity. Since Marsilio Ficino and Giovanni Pico della Mirandola, this was a common thread in Renaissance thought which spread from Italy to France and Germany, but this was the first book devoted to the subject. Steuco believed that Roman Catholicism, centred on the Gospels, is the true hidden core of pagan beliefs; Theobald Freudenberger commented that "If a [ancient] passage really refuses to fit into his system, he earnestly addresses the author and admonishes him in a fatherly way to come to his senses." This work has a slight polemical edge to it, as Steuco crafted a number of his arguments to lend support to several theological positions that had recently come under question in Italy by reformers and critics of the traditional Catholic faith. His perspective has been described by Maria Muccillo:

Steuco proposes his “perennial philosophy,” deeply permeated by platonism, in 1540, on the eve of the Council of Trent: at a moment when, after the Protestant Reformation, the chance of restoring the unity of the Christian world would seem to be exhausted, and the very ideal – dear to many exponents of the so-called “Catholic Reform” – of a close interpenetration of the Humanist and the Catholic spirit is beginning to decline. In this historical/religious context, Steuco’s work comes to assume the significance of a desperate last attempt, effected by the means of historical erudition, of reuniting and reconciling the fragmented Christian world ... [It] represents perhaps one of the last attempts to utilize the Humanist ideals in the interest of Catholic Reform, before the latter “will yield to the disciplinary and dogmatic force of the Counter-Reformation, which will preserve from Humanism only the splendid but henceforth empty outer form.”

— Maria Muccillo, Platonismo, Ermetismo e "Prisca Theologia", 7–8

== Interest in Rome ==
As a Roman humanist, he also took a deep interest in the classical ruins of Rome and in the urban renewal efforts of Paul III throughout the city. Of particular note in this vein are a series of short orations that he wrote and possibly delivered at the papal court, urging Paul III to refurbish the aqueduct known as the Aqua Virgo, in order to supply Rome with adequate fresh water, and as a major key to the revitalization of the city itself.

== Attendance at Trent and death ==
In 1547, Steuco was sent by Paul III to attend the Council of Trent, where he could be counted upon to uphold papal prerogatives and authority. He died in Venice in 1548 while in Venice on break from the council. He is now buried in Gubbio.

== Sources ==
- Freudengerger, Theobald. Augustinus Steuchus aus Gubbio, Augustinerchorherr und papstlicher Bibliothekar (1497-1548). Munster in Westfalen: Aschendorffsche, 1935
- Delph, Ronald K. "From Venetian Visitor to Curial Humanist: The Development of Agostino Steuco's ‘Counter’-Reformation Thought." Renaissance Quarterly 47 (1994): 102-39.
- Delph, Ronald K. "Renovatio, Reformatio, and Humanist Ambition in Rome." In Heresy, Culture and Religion in Early Modern Religion. Edited by Ronald K. Delph, Michelle M.Fontaine, and John Jeffries Martin, pp. 73–92. Kirksville, Mo: Truman State University Press, 2006.
- Hanegraaff, Wouter (2012). Esotericism and the Academy: Rejected Knowledge in Western Culture. Cambridge: Cambridge University Press. ISBN 9780521196215.
- Herbermann, Charles, ed. (1913). "Agostino Steuco" . Catholic Encyclopedia. New York: Robert Appleton Company.
- Chisholm, Hugh, ed. (1911). "Steuco, Agostino" . Encyclopædia Britannica. Vol. 25 (11th ed.). Cambridge University Press. p. 905.
