= The Teachings of the Mystics =

1960 book by Walter T. Stace

- Author: Walter T. Stace
- Genre: Philosophy
- Publication date: 1960

The Teachings of the Mystics is a 1960 work of popular philosophy by the Princeton philosopher Walter T. Stace that lays out his philosophy of mysticism and compiles writings on mystical experience from across religious traditions. The book’s comprehensive selections met with broadly positive responses.

== Synopsis ==
An introductory chapter lays out Stace's philosophy and psychology of mysticism. He defines the principal characteristic of mystical experience as "the apprehension of an ultimate nonsensuous unity in all things", and differentiates it from occult, parapsychological phenomena, visions, voices, and anything "misty" or vague. Stace distinguishes between two types of mystical experience: extrovertive mysticism experiences unity in the world through the physical senses, while an introvertive type experiences unity in the self. Stace sees introvertive mysticism as more important and the focus of The Teachings of the Mystics. He proposes that there is a core to mystical experience, which is more basic and important than superficial differences over time and across cultures. This hypothesis can only be justified by a survey of mystics’ descriptions of their experiences – the book purports to be that. Stace chooses texts that describe mystical experience, rather than interpret or analyse it.

Hindu mysticism

Stace selects from the Chandogya Upanishad, Brihadaranyaka Upanishad, Svetasvatara Upanishad, and Sri Aurobindo's book The Life Divine.

Buddhist mysticism

Stace selects from the Udana on Nirvana, the Mahaparinibbana Sutta of the Digha Nikaya and the Majjhima Nikaya from the Hinayana school. Mahayana selections are taken from The Awakening of Faith by Aśvaghoṣa, the Maha Prajna Paramita Hridaya and the Diamond Sutra. Zen is represented by DT Suzuki on Satori, Eugen Herrigel on the Koan and satori.

Taoist mysticism

Selections are taken from Laozi's Tao Te Ching.

Plotinus

Enneads selected include those that describe "The Ascent to Union with the One".

Christian mysticism

Selections are taken from Dionysius the Areopagite's The Divine Names and Mystical Theology, various Meister Eckhart sermons, Jan van Ruysbroeck's The Adornment of Spiritual Marriage and The Book of Supreme Truth, excerpts from The Life of St. Theresa and The Interior Castle by St. Theresa of Ávila, and from The Dark Night of the Soul by St. John of the Cross.

Islamic mysticism

Mystics represented include Abu Said Ibn al Arabi's Kitab al-Wajd, Abu Yazid Al Bistami, Ibn Sina (Avicena), Farid al-Din Attar's The Conference of the Birds, Ibn al-Arabi, and Jalal al-Din Rumi.

Jewish mysticism

Stace quotes Gershom Scholem, the leading authority on Jewish mysticism, writing that union with God is extremely rare in Judaism, although there are some instances of this in Abraham Abulafia and some later Hasidism. None the less, Stace finds quotes from The Zohar.

After laying out the contemporary mystical experiences of Arthur Koestler in his book The Invisible Writing, Stace in his final chapter rounds up his conclusions drawn over the course of the book and looks to the future of mysticism.

== Critical response ==
The Teachings of the Mystics was seen as a useful historical overview of the central ideas of mysticism, and despite losing something in translation between experience and authorship is never tedious. For Huston Smith, the book could be seen as a companion volume to Stace’s more academic work, Mysticism and Philosophy, although representing his ideas at an earlier stage. The Teachings of the Mystics helps overcome the difficulty that many readers experience with understanding the writings of mystics by its use of clear introductions and brief selections. However, Stace does not spell out his concept of the "universal core" of mysticism precisely enough. Writing in Mind, Thomas McPherson regarded the book as a by-product of Mysticism and Philosophy and, despite quibbling over a few selections, he concluded the book's introductory essay was useful and the selections sensible.

== See also ==
- Time and Eternity – Stace's earlier work on the symbolic nature of religious language
