= Ivan Aguéli =

Sufi master and painter (1869–1917)

Ivan Aguéli ('Abd al-Hādī 'Aqīlī)
- Ivan Aguéli in Cairo.
- Title: Sheikh, "Muqaddim of Europe"

Personal life
- Born: John Gustaf Agelii; 24 May 1869; Sala, Västmanland, Sweden
- Died: 1 October 1917 (aged 48); L'Hospitalet de Llobregat, Catalonia, Spain
- Region: Europe, Egypt
- Main interest(s): Sufism, Impressionism, Symbolism, Comparative religion, Animal rights, Anarchism
- Notable idea(s): Non-syncretic metaphysical comparative analysis of orthodox religious esotericisms, the core of the traditionalist method.
- Notable work: Écrits pour La Gnose (French)

Religious life
- Religion: Sunni Islam
- Creed: Shadhili, Malamatiyya

Senior posting
- Influenced by: Emanuel Swedenborg, Ibn Arabi
- Influenced: René Guénon

Ivan Aguéli (born John Gustaf Agelii; 24 May 1869 – 1 October 1917), also named Shaykh ʿAbd al-Hādī al-ʿAqīlī (Arabic: شيخ عبد الهادی عقیلی) upon his conversion to Islam, was a Swedish wandering Sufi, painter and author. As a devotee of Ibn Arabi, his metaphysics applied to the study of Islamic esotericism and its similarities with other esoteric traditions of the world. He was one of the initiators of René Guénon into Sufism and founder of the Parisian Al Akbariyya society. His art was a unique form of miniature Post-Impressionism where he used the blend of colours to create a sense of depth and distance. His unique style of art made him one of the founders of the Swedish contemporary art movement.

== Childhood and youth ==
Ivan Aguéli was born John Gustaf Agelii in the small Swedish town of Sala in 1869, the son of veterinarian Johan Gabriel Agelii. Through his mother, he was related to the 18th-century Swedish metaphysician Emanuel Swedenborg.

Between the years 1879–1889, Aguéli conducted his studies in Gotland and Stockholm. Early on in his youth he began showing an exceptional artistic talent and a keen interest in religious mysticism.

In 1889, he adopted the name Ivan Aguéli and travelled to Paris, where he became the student of the Symbolist painter Émile Bernard. Before returning to Sweden in 1890 he made a detour to London, where he met the Russian anarchist scholar Peter Kropotkin.

Returning to Stockholm in 1890, Aguéli attended art school where he was taught by the Swedish artists Anders Zorn and Richard Bergh. By the end of 1892, he again returned to Paris, where he became acquainted with French poet and animal-rights activist Marie Huot (1846–1930).

Active in French anarchist circles, he was in 1894 arrested and put on trial in the "Trial of the Thirty". Within months of his release in 1895 he left France for Egypt, where he lived until he returned to Paris in 1896. It was later on in Paris that Aguéli ended up converting to Islam and adopted the name 'Abd al-Hadi.

In 1899, he travelled to Colombo (in today's Sri Lanka), again returning to France in 1900.

== Egypt ==
In 1902 Aguéli moved to Cairo and became one of the first Western European to be officially enrolled at Al-Azhar University, where he studied Arabic and Islamic philosophy. In 1902 he was also initiated into the al-'Arabiyya Shadhiliyya Sufi order by the great Egyptian Shaykh 'Abd al-Rahman Ilaysh al-Kabir (1840–1921).

With the blessing of Shaykh Ilaysh, Aguéli and an Italian journalist named Enrico Insabato (1878–1963) founded and contributed to a magazine published in Cairo (1904–1913) named Il Convito (Arabic: An-Nadi). This was published in Italian and Arabic (and briefly also in Ottoman Turkish). In Arabic, it promoted a favorable view of Italy as a friend of Islam, and in Italian it promoted a favorable view of Islam. It contains the first known use of the term "Islamophobia", in an article by Aguéli.

== Al Akbariyya ==
Aguéli founded Al Akbariyya as a secret Sufi society in Paris in 1911. Among its first members was René Guénon. Its purpose was to promote the teachings of Muhyiddin Ibn Arabi among the "scholarly, educated and freethinking classes..." through the practice of the Shadhili and Malamati Sufi paths. The only time this society is mentioned is in a letter written by Aguéli in September 1911 to an unknown address in Cairo announcing its founding, not much more is known.

During this period, Aguéli wrote several articles on Islamic topics for La Gnose, an esoteric journal edited by Guénon. These articles were late reprinted in Études traditionnelles, the main journal of the Traditionalist movement.

== First World War and Spain ==
Suspected to be an Ottoman spy he was expelled to Spain in 1916. Stranded in Spain, Aguéli was left without money to return to Sweden, and on 1 October 1917, he was killed by a train at a rail crossing in the village of L'Hospitalet de Llobregat outside Barcelona.

After Aguéli's death, Prince Eugen Bernadotte, who was known as a patron of artists, made certain to return his paintings and belongings to Sweden.

== Aguéli's legacy ==
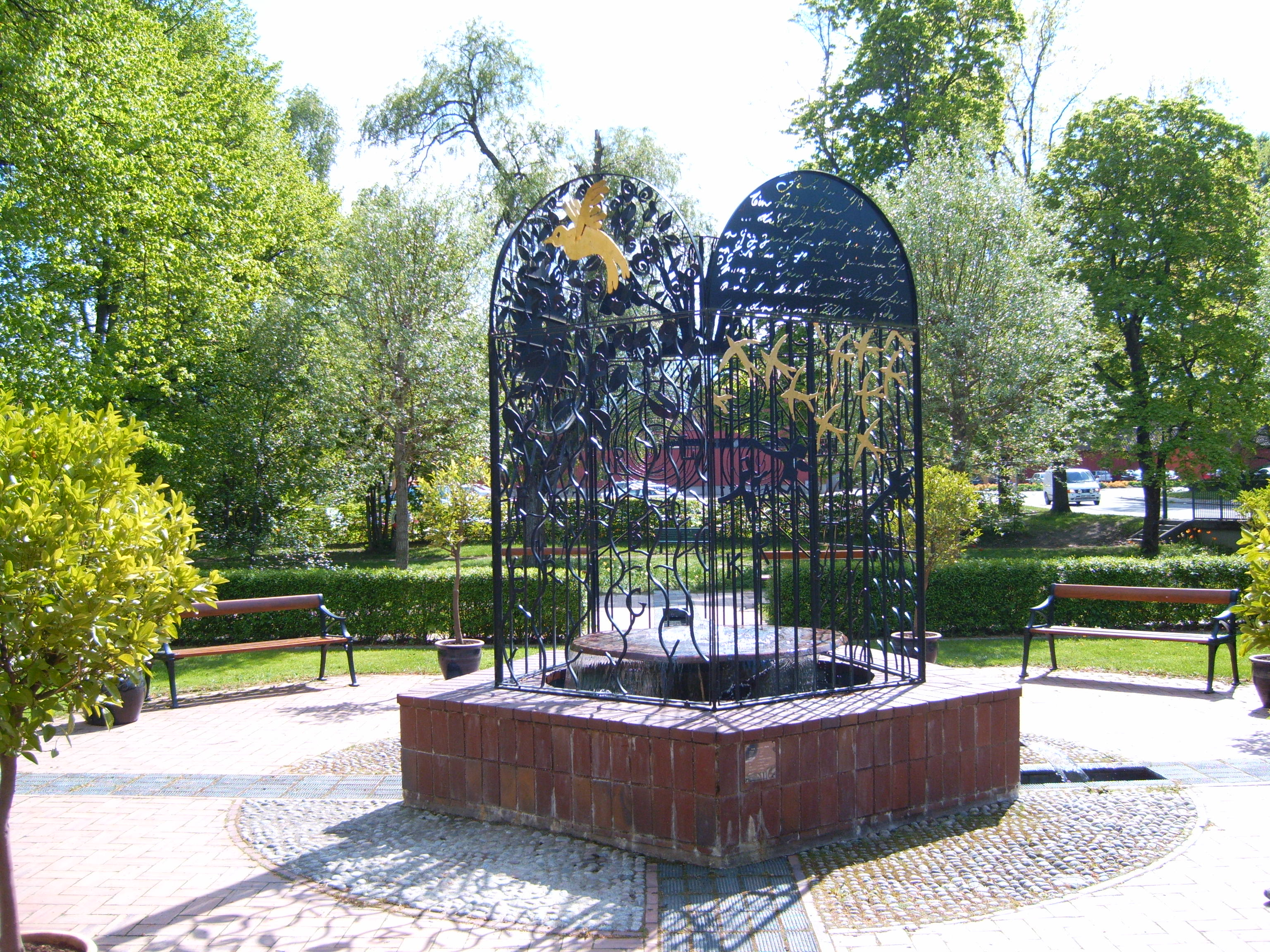
The Fountain of Ivan Aguéli in Sala.

In Sweden, Aguéli is admired as a celebrated contemporary painter. Most of his paintings are found at the Swedish National Museum of Fine Arts, the Museum of Modern Art and the Aguéli Museum in Sala. Aguéli's impact in Sweden was clearly shown in 1969 when, at the centenary of his birth, six of his paintings were printed as stamps by the Swedish Postal Service.

Aguéli is also recognized as an important influence on Guénon and through him on the Traditionalist movement. His views on Islamic esotericism have been widely adopted.

Aguéli's remains were kept in Barcelona, Spain until 1981, when he was brought back to Sweden and re-buried with Islamic rites in his hometown of Sala.

The Aguéli Museum in Sala has the largest collection of his artworks, donated by Sala's well-known physician Carl Friberg to the Nationalmuseum.

== Bibliography ==
Swedish:

- Almqvist, Kurt; I tjänst hos det enda – ur René Guénons verk, Natur & Kultur, 1977.
- Almqvist, Kurt; Ordet är dig nära. Om uppenbarelsen i hjärtat och i religionerna, Delsbo, 1994.
- Brummer, Hans-Erik (ed.); Ivan Aguéli, Stockholm, 2006.
- Ekelöf, Gunnar; Ivan Aguéli, 1944.
- Gauffin, Axel; Ivan Aguéli – Människan, mystikern, målaren I–II, Sveriges Allmänna Konstförenings Publikation, 1940–41.
- Wessel, Viveca; Ivan Aguéli – Porträtt av en rymd, 1988.

English:

- Chacornac, Paul; The Simple Life of Réne Guénon, pp. 31–37, Sophia Perennis.
- Hatina, Meir; Where East Meets West: Sufism as a Lever for Cultural Rapprochement, pp. 389–409, Volume 39, International Journal of Middle East Studies, Cambridge University Press, 2007.
- Jobst, Sean; "Ivan Aguéli: The Unity of Art in Mysticism", in Mystics, Scholars and Holy Men, ed. Troy Southgate. London: Black Front Press, 2014, pp. 183–211.
- Nasr, Seyyed Hossein; Sufism: Love and Wisdom, page X of foreword, Worldwisdom, 2006.
- Nur ad-Din, Farid (introduction and translation); Universality in Islam, Studies in Comparative Religion, Worldwisdom, 2011.
- Sedgwick, Mark (ed.); Anarchist, Artist, Sufi: The Politics, Painting, and Esotericism of Ivan Aguéli, Bloomsbury, 2021, ISBN 9781350177895
- Turner, Jade (ed.); The Grove Dictionary of Art, pp. 465–466, Grove, 1996.
- Waterfield, Robin; Réne Guénon and the Future of the West, pp. 28–30, Sophia Perennis.

French:

- Abdul-Hâdi (John Gustav Agelii, dit Ivan Aguéli); Écrits pour La Gnose, comprenant la traduction de l'arabe du Traité de l'Unité, Archè, 1988.

== See also ==
- Hossein Nasr
- Titus Burckhardt
- Martin Lings
- Shadhiliyya
- Malamatiyya
