= Angus Macnab =

John Angus Macnab
- Born: 1906; London, England
- Died: 1977 (aged 70–71); Madrid, Spain
- Citizenship: British
- Education: Rugby School
- Alma mater: Christ Church, Oxford
- Known for: Writer, translator and fascist politician
- Political party: British Union of Fascists; National Socialist League
- Spouse: Catherine Collins

John Angus Macnab (1906–1977) was a British fascist politician who embraced Roman Catholicism under the influence of G. K. Chesterton and Hilaire Belloc. He was a close associate of William Joyce and later became known as a Perennialist writer on Medieval Spain and a translator of Latin and Greek poetry.

== Early life ==
Macnab was born in London to New Zealand–Scottish parents. The son of a well-known Harley Street eye doctor, MacNab was educated at Rugby School and Christ Church, Oxford. Macnab converted to Catholicism and was a keen mountaineer. Although a gifted translator, he chose on graduation to train as a schoolteacher.

== Political involvement ==
During the 1930s, Macnab shared a flat in London with fascist politician William Joyce, and they became lifelong friends. A witness at Joyce's second marriage, Macnab joined the British Union of Fascists (BUF) and worked in the party's Propaganda Department, editing the party journal, Fascist Quarterly and contributing a weekly antisemitic column, 'Jolly Judah', to its newspaper, The Blackshirt. A loyal ally of Joyce, he complained directly to Oswald Mosley about Joyce's dismissal from the BUF in 1937, but due to the severity of the conflict between Mosley and Joyce, the BUF leader threatened to attack Macnab physically for his complaints, and ultimately had him ejected by force by his Blackshirts.

Following the incident, Macnab joined Joyce and John Beckett in forming the overtly pro-Nazi National Socialist League. The group gained little support, and Macnab travelled with Joyce to Belgium just before the war where they met with Nazi agent Christian Bauer, a journalist with Der Angriff, and travelled onwards with him to Berlin. Although Joyce remained in Germany, Macnab returned to Britain immediately after the outbreak of war, stating that he would not be involved in aiding its enemies.

In the early stages of the Second World War, Macnab served as an ambulance driver, but was soon detained under Defence Regulation 18B due to his previous Nazi sympathies. He was the first person to identify Joyce as "Lord Haw Haw", whose identity had initially been a mystery, when his former university colleague, the Daily Mail journalist Edward Chichester, Marquess of Donegall, asked him to listen to some recordings, suspecting that Joyce had made them, rather than the other leading suspect, John Amery.

Macnab remained loyal to Joyce after his capture and joined Joyce's brother Quentin in a failed attempt to appeal against his death sentence.

== Later life and writings ==
In 1938, under the influence of G. K. Chesterton and Hilaire Belloc, Macnab had embraced scholastic philosophy and traditional Catholicism. Around the same time, he developed an interest in Spain, and in 1945, at the end of World War II, he settled in Toledo with his wife Catherine Collins, an Irish former BUF activist who he had married the same year. The couple lived with their three children, all born in Spain, in the city's Plaza de Santo Tomé, and Macnab made a living by teaching and translating English, as well as writing. He maintained correspondence with A. K. Chesterton for much of the remainder of his life, but took no further role in active politics.

In the mid-1950s, he read Marco Pallis's book Peaks and Lamas. He was strongly affected by Pallis's traditionalist thought and wrote to him to express his gratitude. In response, Pallis suggested to Macnab that he should study the writings of René Guénon and Frithjof Schuon, which he did.

Macnab visited Schuon in Lausanne in 1957, and they remained in contact until his death in Madrid in 1977. While in Spain, Macnab received a number of high-profile visitors from Britain and the United States, including novelists Evelyn Waugh and James Michener, publisher Tom Burns, and Marco Pallis.

Macnab's studies of the history of Moorish Spain resulted in two books: Spain under the Crescent Moon, and Toledo, Sacred and Profane, as well as a number of articles published in the London journal Studies of Comparative Religion from 1965 to 1968. He also wrote Bulls of Iberia, which was described by the English critic Kenneth Tynan as "awesomely good". In an article in the British journal New Blackfriars, William Stoddart paid tribute to Macnab as a leading Catholic intellectual who was the author of a fascinating study of the Spanish Middle Ages.

== Selected works ==
- Spain under the Crescent Moon, Fons Vitae, Louisville KY, 1999.
- Toledo, Sacred and Profane (unpublished)
- Bulls of Iberia, Heinemann, London, 1957.

== See also ==
- Perennial Philosophy
- Traditionalist school
