= Robert K. C. Forman =

Robert K. C. Forman, is a former professor of religion at the City University of New York, author of several studies on religious experience, and co-editor of the Journal of Consciousness Studies.

Forman has worked as professor of religion at City University of New York, both Hunter College and City College, and is Founding Executive Director of The Forge Institute for Spirituality and Social Change. His books include The Problems of Pure Consciousness, The Innate Capacity and "Enlightenment Ain't What It's Cracked Up to Be".

Forman developed the concepts of the Pure Consciousness Event (PCE) and the Dualistic Mystical State (DMS).

== Criticism ==
Lola Williamson has criticized Forman's description of transcendence as "a state of wakeful though contentless existence". Based on interviews with transcendental meditation practitioners, she notes that those transcendent experiences show variations between practitioners, and are also not contentless.

Yaroslav Komarovski (2015) notes that Forman's notion of a "pure consciousness event" (PCE) has a very limited applicability in Tibetan Buddhism. According to Komarovski, the realization of emptiness as described in the Buddhist Madhyamaka tradition is different from the PCE. Not only the realization itself is different, but also the causes and the subsequent influence on the personality. According to Komarovski, it is brought about by specific Buddhist techniques, and results in specific Buddhist objectives, thereby illustrating the opposite of what Forman argues. According to Komarovski, to force the PCE into the spectrum of Tibetan Buddhist practices, it would be, at best, one of the minor events, and not the key mystical experience. Rather, according to Komarvski, "certain experiences and mental states addressed by Tibetan thinkers are treated as PCE due to an oversimplification of and confusion about the nature of those experiences."

== Books ==
- Forman, R.K.C. (ed.) (1990). The Problem of Pure Consciousness: Mysticism and Philosophy. Oxford University Press.
- Forman, R.K.C. (1994). (ed.) Meister Eckhart: Mystic as Theologian: An Experiment in Methodology. Rockport, MASSACHUSETTS: Houghton Mifflin. (Published by Element in 1991).
- Forman, R.K.C. (1997). Mysticism, Mind, Consciousness. New York: State University of New York Press
- Forman, R.K.C. (ed.). (1998). The Innate Capacity: Mysticism, Philosophy and Psychology. New York, Oxford: Oxford University Press.
- Forman, R.K.C., Wilber, K. & Andresen, J. (2000). Cognitive Models and Spi Maps: Interdisciplinary Explorations of Religious Experience. Journal of Consciousness Studies. Imprint Academic.
- Forman, R.K.C. (2004). Grassroots Spirituality: What It Is, Why It Is Here, Where It Is Going. Exeter and Charlottesville: Imprint Academic.
- Forman, R.K.C. (2011). Enlightenment Ain't What It's Cracked Up To Be. John Hunt, UK. O-Books.
- Christianity Reimagined: A Mystical Approach for Doubters and the Dubious, Apocryphile Press, 2025.

== See also ==
- Mysticism
- Hjalmar Sundén
- Turiya
