= Abraham Abulafia =

Spanish Kabbalah teacher (1240-1291)

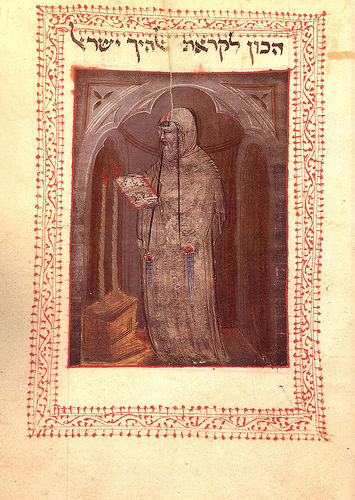
- Abraham Abulafia's "Light of the Intellect" 1285, Vat. ebr. 597 leaf 113 recto
- Born: 1240
- Died: sometime after 1291
- Occupations: Philosopher and writer
- Writing career
- Period: 1271–1291

Abraham ben Samuel Abulafia (Hebrew: אברהם בן שמואל אבולעפיה) was the founder of the school of "Prophetic Kabbalah". He was born in Zaragoza, Kingdom of Aragon, in 1240, and is assumed to have died sometime after 1291 following a stay on the island of Comino in the Maltese archipelago.

== Biography ==
=== Early life and travels ===
Very early in life he was taken by his parents to Tudela, Kingdom of Navarre, where his aged father, Samuel Abulafia, instructed him in the Hebrew Bible and Talmud. In 1258, when Abulafia was eighteen years old, his father died, and Abulafia began a life of ceaseless wandering shortly thereafter. His first journey, in 1260, was to the Land of Israel, where he intended to begin a search for the legendary Sambation and the Ten Lost Tribes. He got no further than port city Akko, however, because of the desolation and lawlessness in the Holy Land stemming from the chaos following the recent Crusade. The battle that year between the Mongol Empire and Mamluk Sultanate forced his return to Europe via Greece. He had determined to go to Rome but stopped short in Capua, where during the early 1260s, he devoted himself with passionate zeal to the study of philosophy and The Guide for the Perplexed of Maimonides under the tutelage of a philosopher and physician named Hillel—probably the well-known Hillel ben Samuel of Verona.

Although he always held Maimonides in the highest esteem, and often made use of sentences from his writings, he was as little satisfied with his philosophy as with any other branch of knowledge which he acquired. He was highly articulate, and able and eager to teach others. He wrote industriously on kabbalistic, philosophical, and grammatical subjects, and succeeded in surrounding himself with numerous pupils to whom he imparted much of his own enthusiasm.

On his return to Spain he became subject to visions, and, at the age of thirty-one, in Barcelona, began to study a particular kind of Kabbalah whose most important representative was Barukh Togarmi, and received a revelation with messianic overtones. He immersed himself in the study of the Sefer Yetzirah ("Book of Creation"), which explained the creation of the world and humankind as based on Hebrew letter combinations, as well as its commentaries. The Sefer, and particularly the commentary and method of the German Jewish mystic Eleazar of Worms, exercised a deep influence upon Abulafia and had the effect of greatly increasing his mystical bent. Letters of the alphabet, numerals, and vowel-points all assumed mystical meaning to him, and their combinations and permutations, supplementing and explaining one another, possessed an illumining power most effectively disclosed in a deep study of the divine names (especially of the consonants of the Tetragrammaton). With such auxiliaries, and with the observance of certain rites and ascetic practices, men, he said, may attain the highest aim of existence and become prophets; not in order to work miracles and signs, but to reach the highest degree of perception and be able to penetrate intuitively into the inscrutable nature of the Deity, the riddles of creation, the problems of human life, the purpose of the precepts, and the deeper meaning of the Torah.

He soon left for Castile, where he disseminated his prophetic Kabbalah among figures like Rabbi Moses of Burgos and his most important disciple, Joseph ben Abraham Gikatilla. However, it bears mention that Abulafia is not mentioned in any of Gikatilla's works.

Some time around 1275; he taught The Guide for the Perplexed and his Kabbalah in a few cities in Greece. He wrote the first of his prophetic books, Sefer haYashar ("Book of the Upright/Righteous"), in Patras in 1279. That same year, he made his way through Trani back to Capua, where he taught four young students.

=== Journey to Rome ===
He went to Rome in 1280 in order to convert Pope Nicholas III to Judaism on the day before Rosh Hashanah. The Pope was in Soriano when he heard of it, and he issued orders to "burn the fanatic" as soon as he reached that place. The stake was erected in preparation close to the inner gate; but Abulafia set out for Soriano all the same and reached there August 22. While passing through the outer gate, he heard that the Pope had died from an apoplectic stroke during the preceding night. He returned to Rome, where he was thrown into prison by the Order of Friars Minor but was liberated after four weeks' detention. He was next heard of in Sicily.

=== Decline and exile to Comino ===
He remained active in Messina for a decade (1281–91), presenting himself as a "prophet", "messiah" and "son of God". He had several students there as well as some in Palermo. The local Jewish congregation in Palermo energetically condemned Abulafia's conduct, and around 1285 addressed the issue to Shlomo ben Aderet of Barcelona, who devoted much of his career to calming the various messianic hysteriae of the day. Shlomo ben Aderet subsequently wrote a letter against Abulafia. This controversy was one of the principal reasons for the exclusion of Abulafia’s Kabbalah from the Spanish schools.

Abulafia had to take up the pilgrim's staff anew, and under distressing conditions compiled his Sefer haOt "Book of the Sign" on the little island of Comino, near Malta, between 1285 and 1288. In 1291 he wrote his last, and perhaps his most intelligible work, the meditation manual Imrei Shefer "Words of Beauty"; after this, all trace of him is lost.

== Teachings ==
=== Writings ===
Abulafia’s literary activity spans the years 1271–1291 and consists of several books, treatises on grammar, and poems, but amongst which only thirty survive. He wrote many commentaries: three on the Guide of the Perplexed – Sefer ha-Ge’ulah (1273), Sefer Chayei ha-Nefesh, and Sefer Sitrei Torah (1280); on Sefer Yetzirah: – Otzar Eden Ganuz (1285/6), Gan Na'ul, and a third untitled; and a commentary on the Pentateuch – Sefer-Maftechot ha-Torah (1289).

More influential are his handbooks, teaching how to achieve the prophectic experience: Chayei ha-Olam ha-Ba (1280), Or ha-Sekhel, Sefer ha-Cheshek, and Imrei Shefer (1291).

Of special importance for understanding his messianology are his "prophetic books" written between 1279 (in Patras) and 1288 (in Messina), in which revelations including apocalyptic imagery and scenes are interpreted as pointing to spiritual processes of inner redemption. The spiritualized understanding of the concepts of messianism and redemption as an intellectual development represents a major contribution of the messianic ideas in Judaism. As part of his messianic propensity, Abulafia become an intense disseminator of his Kabbalah, orally and in written form, trying to convince both Jews and Christians.

In his first treatises, Get ha-Shemot and Maftei’ach ha-Re'ayon, Abulafia describes a linguistic type of Kabbalah similar to the early writings of Rabbi Joseph Gikatilla. In his later writings, the founder of prophetic Kabbalah produces a synthesis between Maimonides' Neoaristotelian understanding of prophecy as the result of the transformation of the intellectual influx into a linguistic message and techniques to reach such experiences by means of combinations of letters and their pronunciation, breathing exercises, contemplation of parts of the body, movements of the head and hands, and concentration exercises. Some of the elements of those techniques stem from commentaries on Sefer Yetzirah of Ashkenazi. He called his Kabbalah "the Kabbalah of names," that is, of divine names, being a way to reach what he called the prophetic experience, or "prophetic Kabbalah," as the ultimate aims of his way: unitive and revelatory experiences. In his writings expressions of what is known as the unio mystica of the human and the supernal intellects may be discerned. Much less concerned with the theosophy of his contemporary kabbalists, who were interested in theories of ten hypostatic sefirot, some of which he described as worse than the Christian belief in the trinity, Abulafia depicted the supernal realm, especially the cosmic Agent Intellect, in linguistic terms, as speech and letters.

In his later books, Abulafia repeatedly elaborated upon a system of seven paths of interpretation, which he used sometimes in his commentary on the Pentateuch, which starts with the plain sense, includes also allegorical interpretation, and culminates in interpretations of the discrete letters, the latter conceived of as the path to prophecy. Abulafia developed a sophisticated theory of language, which assumes that Hebrew represents not so much the language as written or spoken as the principles of all languages, namely the ideal sounds and the combinations between them. Thus, Hebrew as an ideal language encompasses all the other languages. This theory of language might have influenced Dante Alighieri. In his writings Abulafia uses Greek, Latin, Italian, Arabic, Tatar, and Basque words for purpose of gematria.

Abulafia's Kabbalah inspired a series of writings which can be described as part of his prophetic Kabbalah, namely, as striving to attain extreme forms of mystical experiences. The most important among them are the anonymous Sefer ha-Tzeruf (translated into Latin for Pico), Sefer Ner Elohim, and Sefer Shaarei Tzedek by Rabbi Nathan ben Saadiah Harar, who influenced the Kabbalah of Rabbi Isaac of Acre. The impact of Abulafia is evident in an anonymous epistle attributed to Maimonides; Rabbi Reuven Tzarfati, a kabbalist active in 14th century Italy; Abraham Shalom, Yohanan Alemanno, Judah Albotini, and Joseph ibn Zagyah; Moses Cordovero and Chaim Vital's influential Shaarei Kedushah; Sabbatai Zevi, Joseph Hamitz, Pinchas Horowitz, and Menahem Mendel of Shklov.

Extant in many manuscripts, Abulafia's writings were not printed by kabbalists, most of whom banned his brand of Kabbalah, and only by chance introduced in their writings a few short and anonymous fragments. Scholarship started with an analysis of his manuscript writings by M. H. Landauer, who attributed the book of the Zohar to him. Adolf Jellinek refuted this attribution and compiled the first comprehensive list of Abulafia's writings, publishing three of Abulafia's shorter treatises (two epistles, printed in 1853/4, and Sefer ha-Ot in 1887), while Amnon Gross published 13 volumes, which include most of Abulafia's books and those of his students' books (Jerusalem, 1999–2004). Major contributions to the analysis of Abulafia's thought and that of his school have been made by Gershom Scholem, Chaim Wirszubski, Moshe Idel, and Elliot R. Wolfson. Some of Abulafia's treatises were translated into Latin and Italian in the circle of Giovanni Pico della Mirandola, mostly by Flavius Mithridates, and Pico’s vision of Kabbalah was significantly influenced by his views. This is the case also with Francesco Giogio Veneto's De Harmonia Mundi.

Abulafia's life inspired a series of literary works such as poems by Ivan Goll, Moses Feinstein (not Rabbi Moshe Feinstein) and Nathaniel Tarn; Umberto Eco's novel Foucault's Pendulum; and a play by George-Elie Bereby; in art, Abraham Pincas' paintings and Bruriah Finkel's sculptures; and several musical pieces.

Abulafia's writings include:

- Sefer ha-Geulah (1273), a commentary on The Guide for the Perplexed
- Sefer Chayei ha-Nefesh, a commentary on The Guide for the Perplexed
- Sefer ha-Yashar ("Book of the Upright/Righteous") (1279)
- Sefer Sitrei Torah (1280), a commentary on The Guide for the Perplexed
- Chayei ha-Olam ha-Ba ("Life of the World to Come") (1280)
- Or ha-Sekhel ("Light of the Intellect")
- Get ha-Shemot
- Maftei’ach ha-Re'ayon
- Gan Na'ul, a commentary on Sefer Yetzirah
- Otzar Eden Ganuz, another commentary on Sefer Yetzirah
- Sefer ha-Cheshek
- Sefer ha-Ot ("Book of the Sign") (1285 x 1288)
- Imrei Shefer ("Words of Beauty") (1291)
- Ve-Zot Li-Yehuda ("And this is for Yehuda")

=== Abulafia's meditation techniques ===
In his numerous works Abulafia focuses on complex devices for uniting with the Agent Intellect, or God, through the recitation of divine names, together with breathing techniques and cathartic practices. Some of Abulafia’s mystic ways were adapted by the Ashkenazi Hasidim. Taking as his framework the metaphysical and psychological system of Moses Maimonides (1135/8–1204), Abulafia strove for spiritual experience, which he viewed as a prophetic state similar to or even identical with that of the ancient Jewish prophets.

Abulafia suggests a method that is based on a stimulus that continuously changes. His intention is not to relax the consciousness by meditation, but to purify it via a high level of concentration which requires doing many actions at the same time. For this, he uses Hebrew letters.

Abulafia’s method includes a number of steps.

- The first step, preparation: the initiate purifies himself through fasting, the wearing of tefillin, and donning pure white garments.
- The second step: the mystic writes out specific letter groups and their permutations.
- The third step, physiological maneuvers: the mystic chants the letters in conjunction with specific respiratory patterns, as well as head positioning.
- The fourth step, mental imagery of letters and human forms: the mystic imagines a human form, and himself without a body. Then the mystic ‘draws’ the letters mentally, projects them onto the ‘screen’ of the ‘imaginative faculty’, i.e. he mentally imagines the patterns of letters. He then rotates the letters and turns them, as Abulafia describes in Imrei Shefer: "And they [the letters], with their forms, are called the Clear Mirror, for all the forms having brightness and strong radiance are included in them. And one who gazes at them in their forms will discover their secrets and speak to them, and they will speak to him. And they are like an image in which a man sees all his forms standing in front of him, and then he will be able to see all the general and specific things (Ms. Paris BN 777, fol. 49)."

During the final step of mental imagery, the mystic passes a succession of four experiences. The first is an experience of body-photism or illumination, in which light not only surrounds the body but also diffuses into it, giving impression that the body and its organs have become light. As the ecstatic Kabbalist continues to practice, combining letters and performing physiological maneuvers, the result is the second experience: weakening of the body, in an ‘absorptive’ manner. Subsequently, the mystic may feel an enhancement of his thoughts and imaginative capacity. This is the third experience. The fourth experience is characterized mainly by fear and trembling.

Abulafia emphasizes that trembling is a basic and necessary step to obtain prophecy (Sitrei Torah, Paris Ms. 774, fol. 158a). In another place he writes: ‘all your body will begin to tremble, and your limbs begin to shake, and you will fear a tremendous fear […] and the body will tremble, like the rider who races the horse, who is glad and joyful, while the horse trembles beneath him’ (Otzar Eden Ganuz, Oxford Ms. 1580, fols. 163b-164a; see also Hayei Haolam Haba, Oxford 1582, fol. 12a).

For Abulafia the fear is followed by an experience of pleasure and delight. This feeling is a result of sensing another ‘spirit’ within his body, as he describes in Otzar Eden Ganuz: ‘And you shall feel another spirit awakening within yourself and strengthening you and passing over your entire body and giving you pleasure’ (Oxford Ms. 1580 fols. 163b-164a).

Only after passing these successive experiences does the mystic reach his goal: the vision of a human form, which is closely linked to his own physical appearance and generally experienced as standing in front of the mystic. The experience is increased when the mystic experiences his autoscopic form (or ‘double’) as speaking: the double begins to talk to the mystic, teaching him the unknown and revealing the future.

Abraham Abulafia describes the experience of seeing a human ‘form’ many times in his writings. However, initially it is not clear who this ‘form’ is. As the dialog between the mystic and the ‘form’ proceeds, the reader understands that the ‘form’ is the image of the mystic himself. Addressing his students and followers in Sefer haKheshek, Abulafia further elaborates the scenario:

[A]nd sit as though a man is standing before you and waiting for you to speak with him; and he is ready to answer you concerning whatever you may ask him, and you say "speak" and he answers […] and begin then to pronounce [the name] and recite first "the head of the head" [i.e. the first combination of letters], drawing out the breath and at great ease; and afterwards go back as if the one standing opposite you is answering you; and you yourself answer, changing your voice[.]

Apparently, by utilizing the letters of ‘the Name’ with specific breath techniques, a human form should appear. Only in the last sentence Abulafia suggests that this form is ‘yourself’.

Yet he explicitly put it, as he has also explained in another book, Sefer haYei haOlam haBa: "And consider his reply, answering as though you yourself had answered yourself" (Oxford Ms. 1582, fol. 56b). Most of Abulafia’s descriptions are written in a similar fashion. In Sefer haOt, Abulafia describes a similar episode, but from an explicit self-perspective:"I saw a man coming from the west with a great army, the number of the warriors of his camp being twenty-two thousand men […] And when I saw his face in the sight, I was astonished, and my heart trembled within me, and I left my place and I longed for it to call upon the name of God to help me, but that thing evaded my spirit. And when the man had seen my great fear and my strong awe, he opened his mouth and he spoke, and he opened my mouth to speak, and I answered him according to his words, and in my words I became another man (pp. 81–2)."

== Influence ==
Abulafia's subterranean influence is evident in the large number of manuscripts of his major meditation manuals that flourished down to the present day until all his works were finally published in Mea Shearim in Jerusalem during the 1990s.

Abulafia's prophetic and messianic pretensions prompted a sharp reaction on the part of Shelomoh ben Avraham Adret, a famous legal authority who succeeded in annihilating the influence of Abulafia's ecstatic Kabbalah in Spain (responsa volume 1 #548).

According to Besserman's The Shambhala Guide to Kabbalah and Jewish Mysticism, Abulafia's "prophetic approach to meditation included manipulating the Hebrew letters in a nondenominational context that brought him into conflict with the Jewish establishment and provoked the Inquisition."

In Italy, however, his works were translated into Latin and contributed substantially to the formation of Christian Kabbalah.

In the Middle East, ecstatic Kabbalah was accepted without reservation. Clear traces of Abulafian doctrine are evident in the works of Isaac ben Samuel of Acre, Yehudah Albotini and Hayyim ben Joseph Vital. In Israel, Abulafia's ideas were combined with Sufi elements, apparently stemming from the school of Ibn Arabi; thus Sufi views were introduced into European Kabbalah.

After the expulsion of the Jews from Spain, Spanish theurgical Kabbalah, which had developed without any significant influence from ecstatic Kabbalah, was integrated with the latter; this combination became, through the book Pardes Rimmonim by Mosheh Cordovero, part of mainstream Kabbalah. Hayyim Vital brought Abulafian views into the fourth unpublished part of his Shaarei Kedushah, and the eighteenth-century qabalists of the Beit El Academy in Jerusalem perused Abulafia's mystical manuals. Later on, mystical and psychological conceptions of Kabbalah found their way directly and indirectly to the Polish Hasidic masters. The influence of ecstatic Kabbalah is to be seen in isolated groups today, and traces of it can be found in modern literature (e.g., the poetry of Yvan Goll), mainly since the publication of Gershom Scholem's researches, and subsequently the groundbreaking studies of Moshe Idel.

== See also ==
- List of Jewish messiah claimants

== Publications ==
- Abulafia, Abraham (2012), Abraham Abulafia: Meditations on the Divine Name, translated by Solomon, Avi, ASIN B003YUCR1S.
- Abulafia, Abraham (30 November 2022), "Light of the Intellect", Patreon, translated by Solomon, Avi.

== Bibliography ==
- Idel, Moshe "The Renascence of Abraham Abulafia in the Last Generation"
- Idel, Moshe "Abraham Abulafia and the Prophetic Kabbalah"
- Idel, Moshe "The Mystical Experience in Abraham Abulafia"
- Scholem, Gershom "Abraham Abulafia and the Doctrine of Prophetic Kabbalism, ch. 4, Major Trends in Jewish Mysticism"
