= Zohar =

Foundational work in Kabbalah literature

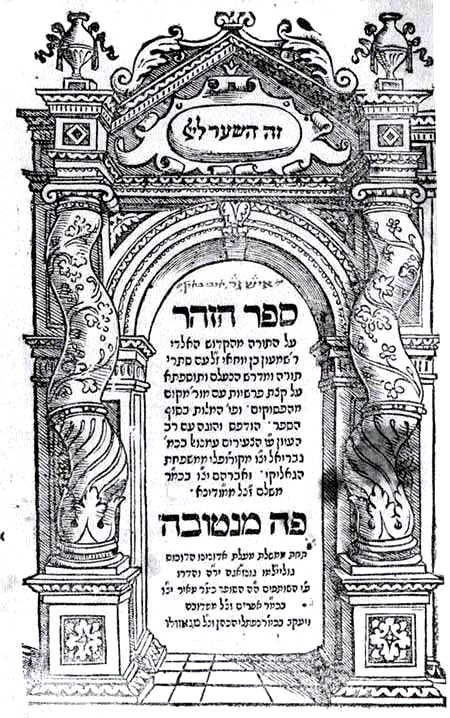
- Title page of the first printed edition of the Zohar, Mantua, 1558

Information
- Religion: Judaism
- Author: Moses de León
- Language: Aramaic, Medieval Hebrew
- Period: High medieval

Full text
- Zohar at Hebrew Wikisource
- Zohar at English Wikisource

The Zohar (Hebrew: זֹהַר, romanized: Zōhar, lit. 'Splendor' or 'Radiance' (Note: The Biblical Hebrew word zohar appears only in the vision of Ezekiel 8:2, "And I saw, and there was a figure with the appearance of fire [in MT; other versions, a man]; the appearance of his loins and below, fire; his loins and above, like the appearance of zohar, like the look of hashmala", and in Daniel 12:3, "The sages will yazhiru like the zohar of the sky, and those who make the masses righteous, like stars forever and ever.")) is a foundational work of Kabbalistic literature. It is a group of books including commentary on the mystical aspects of the Torah and scriptural interpretations as well as material on mysticism, mythical cosmogony, and mystical psychology. The Zohar contains discussions of the nature of God, the origin and structure of the universe, the nature of souls, redemption, the relationship of ego to darkness and "true self" to "the light of God".

The Zohar was first publicized by Moses de León (c. 1240 – 1305 CE), who claimed it was a Tannaitic work recording the teachings of Shimon ben Yochai (Note: In the Zohar and later works which adopt its stylings, ben Yochai is usually called "bar Yochai" in the Aramaic fashion. However, as a Palestinian Tannaitic sage, he is properly called "ben Yochai," as he is in genuinely ancient texts without exception.) (c. 100 CE). This claim is universally rejected by modern scholars, most of whom believe de León, also an infamous forger of Geonic material, wrote the book himself between 1280 and 1286. Some scholars argue that the Zohar is the work of multiple medieval authors and/or contains a small amount of genuinely antique novel material. Later additions to the Zohar, including Tiqqune hazZohar and Ra'ya Meheimna, were composed by a 14th century imitator.

== Language ==
=== Zoharic Aramaic ===
According to Gershom Scholem and other modern scholars, Zoharic Aramaic is an artificial dialect largely based on a linguistic fusion of the Babylonian Talmud and Targum Onkelos, but confused by de León's simple and imperfect grammar, his limited vocabulary, and his reliance on loanwords, including from contemporaneous medieval languages. The author further confused his text with occasional strings of Aramaic-seeming gibberish, in order to give the impression of obscure knowledge. While acknowledging that Zoharic Aramaic did not develop organically from any preexisting dialect, some recent scholarship argues that Aramaic was chosen for literary or mystical purposes, not merely to disguise the forgery.

=== Zoharic Hebrew ===
The original text of the Zohar, as cited by various early Kabbalists beginning around the 14th century (e.g. Isaac b. Samuel of Acre, David b. Judah the Pious, Israel Alnaqua, Alfonso de Zamora) was partly in Hebrew and partly in Aramaic. (Note: According to the view of Isaiah Tishby, the text was always in Aramaic but early Kabbalists sometimes translated quotations into Hebrew.) By the time of the first edition (1558) the text was entirely in Aramaic, with the exception of the Midrash haNe'elam, where Hebrew words and phrases are often employed as in the Babylonian Talmud. "The Hebrew of the Midrash haNe'elam is similar in its overall form to the language of the early midrashim, but its specific vocabulary, idioms, and stylistic characteristics bear the imprint of medieval Hebrew, and its midrashic manner is clearly that of a later imitation."

== Authorship ==
=== Initial view ===
Abraham Zacuto's 1504 work Sefer Yuhasin (first printed 1566) quotes from the Kabbalist Isaac ben Samuel of Acre's 13th-century chronicle Divre hayYamim (lost), which claims that the widow and daughter of de León revealed that he had written it himself and only ascribed the authorship to Shimon ben Yochai for personal profit:

And [Isaac] went to Spain, to investigate how it happened in his time that the Zohar was found, which Shimon ben Yochai and Eleazar ben Shimon his son had made in the cave . . . and some say that [de Leon] forged it among his forgeries, (Note: For discussion of de Leon's other forgeries, see Wolfson, Elliot R. (1991). “Hai Gaon’s Letter and Commentary on Aleynu: Further Evidence of Moses de León’s Pseudepigraphic Activity,” JQR. 81: 365-409, and the sources cited by Glick, Shmuel (2012). Eshnav le-Sifrut ha-Teshuvot. New York. pp. 237-238.) but [Isaac later] said [in his Otzar haChayyim] that the Palestinian Aramaic (Note: Modern scholars have shown that the Zohar contains no Palestinian Aramaic at all, instead relying on Babylonian sources for its grammar and vocabulary.) sections were genuinely written by Shimon ben Yochai . . . And [Isaac] wrote:

Because I had seen that these words were wonderous, that they ran from a well high above which is beyond those uninitiated into the secrets of the divine, I chased after it and I asked the scholars . . . and some said it had fallen into the hand of the sage Moses de Leon, whom they call Moses of Guadalajara, and some said Shimon ben Yochai had never written this book, but that Moses had written these wonderous words and falsely ascribed them to Shimon ben Yochai and his son Elazar in order to sell them for huge sums of money. And I went to Spain, to the capital city of Valladolid, and presented myself to Moses, and was received favorably, and he swore to me by the Lord that the ancient book of Shimon ben Yochai was that day in his house in Ávila, and that he would show it to me when I visited him, and Moses parted from me to return home, but he sickened in Arévalo on the way, and he died there, and when I heard of this I was mortally pained, and I took to the road, and I came to Ávila, and I found a great old sage there named David de Pancorbo, (Note: In MSS and printings corrupted to "Defan Corpo" and first read this way by Yitzhak Baer; cf. Scholem, "Did Moses de Leon write the Zohar?" [Hebrew] (1926)) and he received me favorably, and I demanded he explain to me the secrets of the Zohar, about which men were disputing, and about which Moses himself had sworn beyond doubt until his death, but about which I did not know upon whom to rely or whom to trust, and he told me, "Know in truth that it is clear to me beyond doubt that it never came to the hand of this Moses, and that there is no Zohar except that of which Moses himself wrote every word. Know that this Moses was a great spendthrift; one day his house was filled with treasures that the wealthy mystics had given him in exchange for excerpts, and the next his wife and children were starving naked in the street. So when we heard that he had died in Arévalo, I went to the house of the richest man in the city, Joseph de Ávila, (Note: "Don Jucaf de Ávila" is mentioned in period Spanish documents according to Yitzhak Baer; see Scholem, Did Moses de Leon write the Zohar? [Hebrew] (1926), p. 18 n. 8.) and said to him, 'Now the time has come for you to earn the priceless Zohar if you will do what I advise', and he followed my advice, and he sent his wife to the house of Moses' widow, and she said to her, 'Know that my wish is to marry your daughter to my son, and I ask nothing from you except the Zohar from which your husband excerpted for many people,' and Moses' widow swore to Joseph's wife, 'By the Lord, my husband never had such a book except in his mind, and everything he wrote came from his own intellect. When I saw him writing, I asked him why he claimed to be excerpting from a book I knew he did not have, and he told me that it was because, while for his own words they would not give a penny, for the divinely inspired work of Shimon ben Yochai they will pay in blood.' And Moses' daughter said exactly the same." Can you ask for better proof than this?

Isaac goes on to say that he obtained mixed evidence of Zohar's authenticity from other Spanish Kabbalists, but the fragment ends abruptly, mid-sentence, without any conclusion. Though Isaac is willing to quote it in his Otzar haChayyim and his Meirat Einayim, he does so rarely. Isaac's testimony was censored from the second edition (1580) and remained absent from all editions thereafter until its restoration nearly 300 years later in the 1857 edition. In 1243 a different Jew had reportedly found a different ancient mystical book in a cave near Toledo, which may have been de Leon's inspiration.

Within fifty years of its appearance in Spain it was quoted by Kabbalists, including the Italian mystical writer Menahem Recanati and Todros ben Joseph Abulafia. However, Joseph ben Waqar harshly attacked the Zohar, which he considered inauthentic, and some Jewish communities, such as the Dor Daim from Yemen, Andalusian (Western Sefardic or Spanish and Portuguese Jews), and some Italian communities, never accepted it as authentic. Other early Kabbalists, such as David b. Judah the Pious (fl. c. 1300), Abraham b. Isaac of Granada, (fl. c. 1300), and David b. Amram of Aden (fl. c. 1350), so readily imitate its pseudepigraphy by ascribing contemporaries' statements to Zoharic sages that it is obvious they understood its nature. The manuscripts of the Zohar are from the 14th-16th centuries.

=== Late Middle Ages ===
By the 15th century, the Zohar's authority in the Iberian Jewish community was such that Joseph ibn Shem-Tov drew arguments from it in his attacks against Maimonides, and even representatives of non-mystical Jewish thought began to assert its sacredness and invoke its authority in the decision of some ritual questions. In Jacobs' and Broyde's view, they were attracted by its glorification of man, its doctrine of immortality, and its ethical principles, which they saw as more in keeping with the spirit of Talmudic Judaism than are those taught by the philosophers, and which was held in contrast to the view of Maimonides and his followers, who regarded man as a fragment of the universe whose immortality is dependent upon the degree of development of his active intellect. The Zohar instead declared Man to be the lord of creation, whose immortality is solely dependent upon his morality.

Conversely, Elia del Medigo (c. 1458 – c. 1493), in his Beḥinat ha-Dat, endeavored to show that the Zohar could not be attributed to Shimon ben Yochai, by a number of arguments. He claims that if it were his work, the Zohar would have been mentioned by the Talmud, as has been the case with other works of the Talmudic period; he claims that had ben Yochai known by divine revelation the hidden meaning of the precepts, his decisions on Jewish law from the Talmudic period would have been adopted by the Talmud, that it would not contain the names of rabbis who lived at a later period than that of ben Yochai; he claims that if the Kabbalah were a revealed doctrine, there would have been no divergence of opinion among the Kabbalists concerning the mystic interpretation of the precepts.

Believers in the authenticity of the Zohar countered that the lack of references to the work in Jewish literature was because ben Yochai did not commit his teachings to writing but transmitted them orally to his disciples over generations until finally the doctrines were embodied in the Zohar. They found it unsurprising that ben Yochai should have foretold future happenings or made references to historical events of the post-Talmudic period.

By the late 16th century, the Zohar was present in one-tenth of all private Jewish libraries in Mantua. The authenticity of the Zohar was accepted by such 16th century Jewish luminaries as Joseph Karo (d. 1575), and Solomon Luria (d. 1574), who wrote nonetheless that Jewish law does not follow the Zohar when it is contradicted by the Babylonian Talmud.

Luria writes that the Zohar cannot even override a minhag. Moses Isserles (d. 1572) writes that he "heard" that the author of the Zohar is ben Yochai. Elijah Levita (d. 1559) did not believe in its antiquity, nor did Joseph Scaliger (d. 1609) or Louis Cappel (d. 1658) or Johannes Drusius (d. 1616). David ibn abi Zimra (d. 1573) held that one can follow the Zohar only when it does not conflict with any other source and records that "You asked me about scribes modifying torah scrolls to accord with the Zohar ... and I was shocked, for how can they consider the Zohar better than the Talmud Bavli, which has come down to us? (Note: Similar discrepancies exist between scribal practice in torah scrolls and the Talmud.) ... So I went myself to the house of the scribe and I found three scrolls which he had edited, and I fixed them, and I restored the Torah to its proper glory."

=== Enlightenment Period ===
Debate continued over the generations; del Medigo's arguments were echoed by Leon of Modena (d. 1648) in his Ari Nohem, by Jean Morin (d. 1659), and by Jacob Emden (d. 1776).

Emden—who may have been familiar with Modena through Morin's arguments—devoted a book to the criticism of the Zohar, called Mitpachas Sefarim (מטפחת ספרים), in an effort against the remaining adherents of the Sabbatean movement (in which Sabbatai Zevi, a Jewish apostate, cited Messianic prophecies from the Zohar as proof of his legitimacy). Emden argued that the book on which Zevi based his doctrines was a forgery, arguing that the Zohar:

- misquotes passages of Scripture
- misunderstands the Talmud
- contains some ritual observances that were ordained by later rabbinical authorities
- mentions the Crusades against Muslims (who did not exist in the 2nd century)
- uses the expression esnoga, a Portuguese term for the synagogue
- gives a mystical explanation of the Hebrew vowel points, which were not introduced until long after the Talmudic period.

Saul Berlin (d. 1794) argued that the presence of an introduction in the Zohar, unknown to the Talmudic literary genre, itself indicates a medieval date.

In the Ashkenazi community of Eastern Europe, religious authorities including Elijah of Vilna (d. 1797) and Shneur Zalman of Liadi (d. 1812) believed in the authenticity of the Zohar, while Ezekiel Landau (d. 1793), in his sefer Derushei HaTzlach (דרושי הצל"ח), argued that the Zohar is to be considered unreliable as it was made public many hundreds of years after Ben Yochai's death and lacks an unbroken tradition of authenticity, among other reasons.

Isaac Satanow accepted Emden's arguments and referred to the Zohar as a forgery, also offering new evidence. By 1813 Samuel David Luzzatto had concluded that "these books [the Zohar and the Tiqqunei Zohar] are utter forgeries," in part because they repeatedly discuss the Hebrew cantillation marks, which were not invented until the 9th century. In 1817 Luzzatto published these arguments, and in 1825 he penned a fuller treatise, giving many reasons why the Zohar could not be ancient. However, he did not publish this until 1852, when he felt it justified by the rise of Hasidism. Moses Landau (d. 1852), Ezekiel's grandson, published the same conclusion in 1822. Isaac Haver (d. 1852) admits the vast majority of content comes from the 13th century but argues that there was a genuine core. Solomon Judah Loeb Rapoport (d. 1867) spoke against the Zohar's antiquity. Eliakim ha-Milzahgi (d. 1854) accepted Emden's arguments.

The influence of the Zohar in Yemen contributed to the formation of the Dor Deah movement, led by Yiḥyah Qafiḥ in the later part of the 19th century. Among its objects was the opposition of the influence of the Zohar, as presented in Qafiḥ's Milhamoth Hashem (Wars of the Lord) and Da'at Elohim.

Shlomo Zalman Geiger (d. 1878), in his book Divrei Kehilot on the liturgical practice of Frankfurt am Main, records that "We do not say brikh shmei in Frankfurt, because its source is in the Zohar, and the sages of Frankfurt refused to accept Qabbalah."

=== Modern religious views ===
In 1892, Adolf Neubauer called on the Orthodox rabbinate to reject the Zohar as a forgery and to remove Zoharic prayers from the liturgy. However, Yechiel Michel Epstein (d. 1908) and Yisrael Meir Kagan (d. 1933) both believed in the authenticity of the Zohar, as did Menachem Mendel Kasher (d. 1983), Aryeh Kaplan (d. 1983), David Luria (d. 1855), and Chaim Kanievsky (d. 2022). Aryeh Carmell (d. 2006) did not, and Eliyahu Dessler (d. 1953) accepted the possibility that it was composed in the 13th century. Moshe Feinstein wrote in 1953 that "the Zohar and Tikkunim are the words of the Tannaim". Gedaliah Nadel (d. 2004) was unsure if the Zohar were genuine but was sure that it is acceptable to believe that it is not. Ovadia Yosef (d. 2013) held that Orthodox Jews should accept the Zohar's antiquity in practice based on medieval precedent, but agreed that rejecting it is rational and religiously valid. Joseph Hertz (d. 1946) called the claim of ben Yochai's authorship "untenable", citing Gershom Scholem's evidence. Samuel Belkin (d. 1976) argued that the Mystical Midrash section, specifically, predated de León. Joseph B. Soloveitchik (d. 1993) apparently dismissed the Zohar's antiquity. Moses Gaster (d. 1939) wrote that the claim of ben Yochai's authorship was "untenable" but that Moses de León had compiled earlier material. Meir Mazuz (d. 2025) accepts Emden's arguments. Yeshayahu Leibowitz wrote (1990) that "Moses de León composed the Zohar in the 1270s as certainly as Theodor Herzl composed Der Judenstaat in the 1890s ... the Zohar was influential because in every generation the idolatrous influence outpowers the true faith".

=== Modern critical views ===
Early attempts included M. H. Landauer's Vorläufiger Bericht über meine Entdeckung in Ansehung des Sohar (1845), which fingered Abraham Abulafia as the author, and Samuel David Luzzatto's ויכוח על חכמת הקבלה (1852), but the first systematic and critical academic proof for the authorship of Moses de León was given by Adolf Jellinek in his 1851 monograph "Moses ben Shem-tob de León und sein Verhältnis zum Sohar". Jellinek's proofs, which combined previous analyses with Isaac of Acre's testimony and comparison of the Zohar to de Leon's Hebrew works, were accepted by every other major scholar in the field, including Heinrich Graetz (History of the Jews, vol. 7), Moritz Steinschneider, Bernhard Beer, Leopold Zunz, and Christian David Ginsburg. Ginsburg summarized Jellinek's, Graetz's, and other scholars' proofs for the English-reading world in 1865, also introducing several novel proofs, including that the Zohar includes a translation of a poem by Solomon ibn Gabirol (d. 1058) and that it includes a mystical explanation of a mezuzah style only introduced in the 13th century. Adolf Neubauer and Samuel Rolles Driver were convinced by these arguments, but Edward Bouverie Pusey held to a Tannaitic date.

By 1913, the critical view had apparently lost some support: Israel Abrahams recalls that "Zunz, like Graetz, had little patience with the Zohar . . . at this date we are much more inclined to treat the Kabbalah with respect."

Gershom Scholem, who was to found modern academic study of Kabbalah, began his career at the Hebrew University of Jerusalem in 1925 with a lecture in which he promised to refute Graetz and Jellinek. However, after years of research, he came to conclusions similar to theirs by 1938, when he argued again that de León was the most likely author. Scholem noted the Zohar's frequent errors in Aramaic grammar, its suspicious traces of Arabic and Spanish words and sentence patterns, and its lack of knowledge of the Land of Israel, among other proofs.

Scholem's views are widely held as accurate among historians of Kabbalah, but they are not uncritically accepted. Scholars who continue to research the background of the Zohar include Yehuda Liebes (who wrote his doctorate thesis for Scholem on the subject, Dictionary of the Vocabulary of the Zohar in 1976), and Daniel C. Matt, a student of Scholem's who has published a critical edition of the Zohar.

==== Influences ====
Academic studies of the Zohar show that many of its ideas are based in the Talmud, various works of midrash, and earlier Jewish mystical works. Scholem writes:

The writer had expert knowledge of the early material and he often used it as a foundation for his expositions, putting into it variations of his own. His main sources were the Babylonian Talmud, the complete Midrash Rabbah, the Midrash Tanhuma, and the two Pesiktot (Pesikta De-Rav Kahana or Pesikta Rabbati), the Midrash on Psalms, the Pirkei de-Rabbi Eliezer, and the Targum Onkelos. Generally speaking, they are not quoted exactly, but translated into the peculiar style of the Zohar and summarized. [...]
Less use is made of the halakhic Midrashim, the Jerusalem Talmud, and the other Targums, nor of the Midrashim like the Aggadat Shir ha-Shirim, the Midrash on Proverbs, and the Alfabet de-R. Akiva. It is not clear whether the author used the Yalkut Simeoni, or whether he knew the sources of its aggadah separately. Of the smaller Midrashim he used the Heikhalot Rabbati, the Alfabet de-Ben Sira, the Sefer Zerubabel, the Baraita de-Ma'aseh Bereshit, [and many others] [...]

At the same time, Scholem says, the author "invent[ed] a number of fictitious works that the Zohar supposedly quotes, e.g., the Sifra de-Adam, the Sifra de-Hanokh, the Sifra di-Shelomo Malka, the Sifra de-Rav Hamnuna Sava, the Sifra de-Rav Yeiva Sava, the Sifra de-Aggadeta, the Raza de-Razin and many others."

The Zohar also draws from the Bible commentaries written by medieval rabbis, including Rashi, Abraham ibn Ezra, David Kimhi and even authorities as late as Nachmanides and Maimonides, and earlier mystical texts such as the Sefer Yetzirah and the Bahir and the medieval writings of the Hasidei Ashkenaz.

Another influence that Scholem, and scholars like Yehudah Liebes and Ronit Meroz have identified was a circle of Spanish Kabbalists in Castile who dealt with the appearance of an evil side emanating from within the world of the sefirot. Scholem saw this dualism of good and evil within the Godhead as a kind of gnostic inclination within Kabbalah, and as a predecessor of the Sitra Ahra (the other, evil side) in the Zohar. The main text of the Castile circle, the Treatise on the Left Emanation, was written by Jacob ha-Cohen around 1265.

== Contents ==
=== Printings, editions, and indexing ===
Tikunei haZohar was first printed in Mantua in 1557. The main body of the Zohar was printed in Cremona in 1558 (a one-volume edition), in Mantua in 1558-1560 (a three-volume edition), and in Salonika in 1597 (a two-volume edition). Each of these editions included somewhat different texts. A copy of the second volume of Mantua first-edition that traveled through Thereisenstadt during the second World War recently resurfaced at the National Library of Israel. When they were printed there were many partial manuscripts in circulation that were not available to the first printers. These were later printed as Zohar Chadash (lit. 'New Radiance'), but Zohar Chadash actually contains parts that pertain to the Zohar, as well as Tikunim (plural of Tikun, "Repair", see also Tikkun olam) that are akin to Tikunei haZohar, as described below. The term Zohar, in usage, may refer to just the first Zohar collection, with or without the applicable sections of Zohar Chadash, or to the entire Zohar and Tikunim.

Citations referring to the Zohar conventionally follow the volume and page numbers of the Mantua edition, while citations referring to Tikkunei haZohar follow the edition of Ortakoy (Constantinople) 1719 whose text and pagination became the basis for most subsequent editions. Volumes II and III begin their numbering anew, so citation can be made by parashah and page number (e.g. Zohar: Nasso 127a), or by volume and page number (e.g. Zohar III:127a).

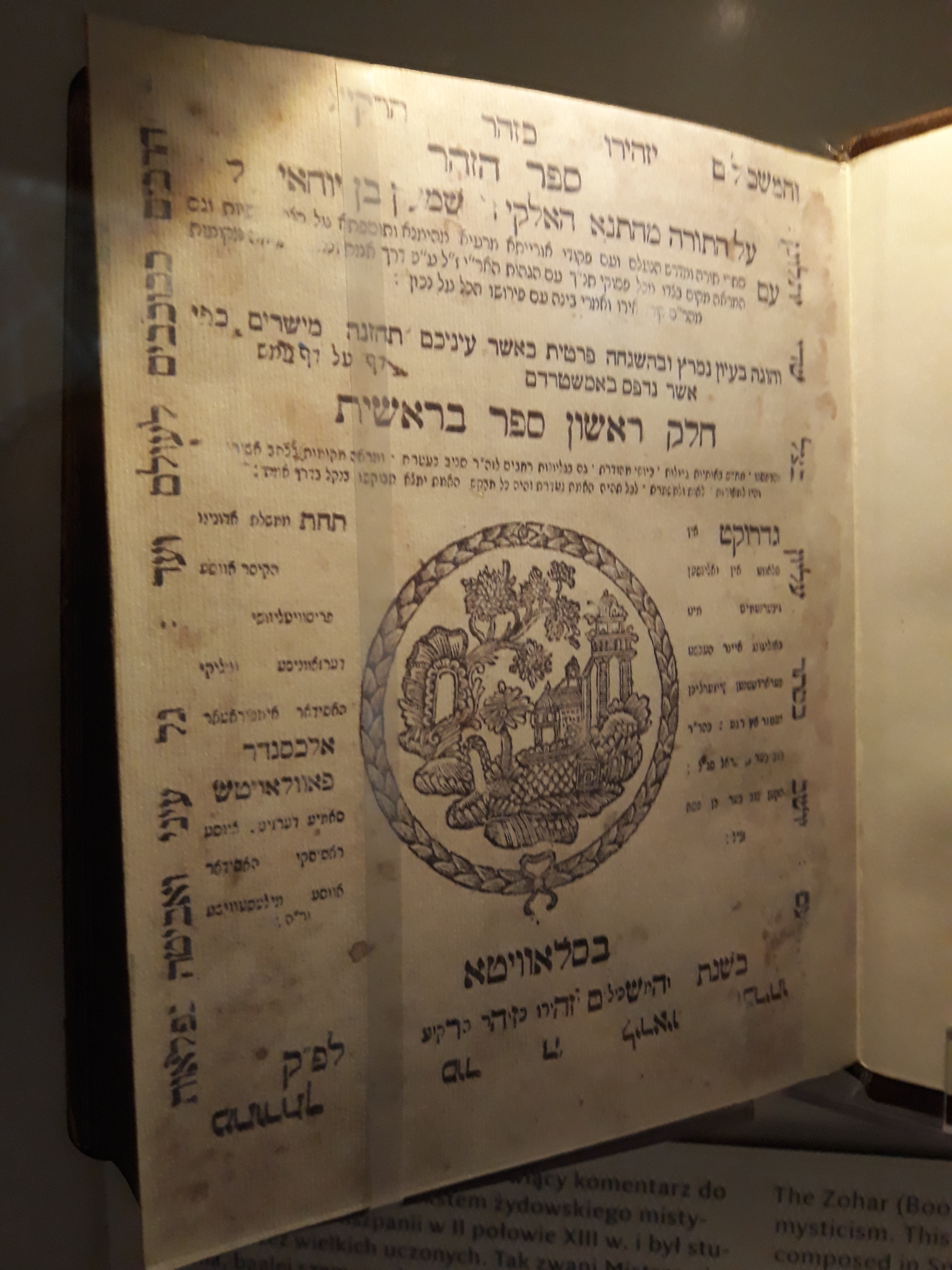
An 1809 edition of the Zohar, printed in Slavuta, as seen in POLIN Museum of the History of Polish Jews

=== The New Zohar (זוהר חדש) ===
After the book of the Zohar had been printed (in Mantua and in Cremona, in the Jewish years 5318–5320 or 1558–1560? CE), many more manuscripts were found that included paragraphs pertaining to the Zohar which had not been included in printed editions. The manuscripts pertained also to all parts of the Zohar; some were similar to Zohar on the Torah, some were similar to the inner parts of the Zohar (Midrash haNe'elam, Sitrei Otiyot and more), and some pertained to Tikunei haZohar. Some thirty years after the first edition of the Zohar was printed, the manuscripts were gathered and arranged according to the parashiyot of the Torah and the megillot (apparently the arrangement was done by the Kabbalist, Avraham haLevi of Tsfat), and were printed first in Salonika in Jewish year 5357 (1587? CE), and then in Kraków (5363), and afterwards in various editions.

=== Structure ===
According to Scholem, the Zohar can be divided into 21 types of content, of which the first 18 (a.–s.) are the work of the original author (probably de Leon) and the final 3 (t.–v.) are the work of a later imitator.

a. Untitled Torah commentary

A "bulky part" which is "wholly composed of discursive commentaries on various passages from the Torah".

b. Book of Concealment (ספרא דצניעותא)

A short part of only six pages, containing a commentary to the first six chapters of Genesis. It is "highly oracular and obscure," citing no authorities and explaining nothing.

c. Greater Assembly (אדרא רבא)

This part contains an explanation of the oracular hints in the previous section. Ben Yochai's friends gather together to discuss secrets of Kabbalah. After the opening of the discussion by Ben Yochai, the sages rise, one after the other, and lecture on the secret of Divinity, while ben Yochai adds to and responds to their words. The sages become steadily more ecstatic until three of them die. Scholem calls this part "architecturally perfect."

d. Lesser Assembly (אדרא זוטא)

Ben Yochai dies and a speech is quoted in which he explains the previous section.

e. Assembly of the Tabernacle (אדרא דמשכנא)

This part has the same structure as c. but discusses instead the mysticism of prayer.

f. Palaces (היכלות)

Seven palaces of light are described, which are perceived by the devout in death. This description appears again in another passage, heavily embellished.

g. Secretum Secretorum (רזא דרזין)

An anonymous discourse on physiognomy and a discourse on chiromancy by ben Yochai.

h. Old Man (סבא)

An elaborate narrative about a speech by an old Kabbalist.

i. Child (ינוקא)

A story of a prodigy and his Kabbalistic speech.

k. Head of the Academy (רב מתיבתא)

A Pardes narrative in which a head of the celestial academy reveals secrets about the destinies of the soul.

l. Secrets of Torah (סתרי תורה)

Allegorical and mystical interpretations of Torah passages.

m. Mishnas (מתניתין)

Imitations of the Mishnaic style, designed to introduce longer commentaries in the style of the Talmud.

n. Zohar to the Song of Songs

Kabbalistic commentary to the Song of Songs.

o. Standard of Measure (קו המידה)

Profound interpretation of Deut. 6:4.

p. Secrets of Letters (סתרי אותיות)

A monologue by ben Yochai on the letters in the names of God and their use in creation.

q. Commentary to the Merkabah

r. Mystical Midrash (מדרש הנעלם)

A Kabbalistic commentary on the Torah, citing a wide variety of Talmudic sages. According to Ramaz, it is fit to be called Midrash haNe'elam because "its topic is mostly the neshamah (an upper level of soul), the source of which is in Beri'ah, which is the place of the upper Gan Eden; and it is written in the Pardes that drash is in Beri'ah... and the revealed midrash is the secret of externality, and Midrash haNe'elam is the secret of internality, which is the neshamah. And this derush is founded on the neshamah; its name befits it—Midrash haNe'elam.

The language of Midrash haNe'elam is sometimes Hebrew, sometimes Aramaic, and sometimes both mixed. Unlike the body of the Zohar, its drashot are short and not long. Also, the topics it discusses—the work of Creation, the nature of the soul, the days of Mashiach, and Olam Haba—are not of the type found in the Zohar, which are the nature of God, the emanation of worlds, the "forces" of evil, and more.

s. Mystic Midrash on Ruth

A commentary on the Book of Ruth in the same style.

t. Faithful Shepherd (רעיא מהימנא)

By far the largest "book" included in the Zohar, this is a Kabbalistic commentary on Moses' teachings revealed to ben Yochai and his friends. Moshe Cordovero said, "Know that this book, which is called Ra'aya Meheimna, which ben Yochai made with the tzadikim who are in Gan Eden, was a repair of the Shekhinah, and an aid and support for it in the exile, for there is no aid or support for the Shekhinah besides the secrets of the Torah... And everything that he says here of the secrets and the concepts—it is all with the intention of unifying the Shekhinah and aiding it during the exile.

u. Rectifications of the Zohar (תקוני זוהר)

Tikunei haZohar, which was printed as a separate book, includes seventy commentaries called Tikunim (lit. 'Repairs') and an additional eleven Tikunim. In some editions, Tikunim are printed that were already printed in the Zohar Chadash, which in their content and style also pertain to Tikunei haZohar.

Each of the seventy Tikunim of Tikunei haZohar begins by explaining the word Bereshit (בראשית), and continues by explaining other verses, mainly in parashat Bereshit, and also from the rest of Tanakh. And all this is in the way of Sod, in commentaries that reveal the hidden and mystical aspects of the Torah.

Tikunei haZohar and Ra'aya Meheimna are similar in style, language, and concepts, and are different from the rest of the Zohar. For example, the idea of the Four Worlds is found in Tikunei haZohar and Ra'aya Meheimna but not elsewhere, as is true of the very use of the term "Kabbalah". In terminology, what is called Kabbalah in Tikunei haZohar and Ra'aya Meheimna is simply called razin (clues or hints) in the rest of the Zohar. In Tikunei haZohar there are many references to chibura kadma'ah (meaning "the earlier book"). This refers to the main body of the Zohar.

v. Further Additions

These include later Tikkunim and other texts in the same style.

== Influence ==
=== Judaism ===
On the one hand, the Zohar was lauded by many rabbis because it opposed religious formalism, stimulated one's imagination and emotions, and for many people helped reinvigorate the experience of prayer. In many places prayer had become a mere external religious exercise, while prayer was supposed to be a means of transcending earthly affairs and placing oneself in union with God.

According to the Jewish Encyclopedia, "On the other hand, the Zohar was censured by many rabbis because it propagated many superstitious beliefs, and produced a host of mystical dreamers, whose overexcited imaginations peopled the world with spirits, demons, and all kinds of good and bad influences." Many classical rabbis, especially Maimonides, viewed all such beliefs as a violation of Jewish principles of faith. Its mystic mode of explaining some commandments was applied by its commentators to all religious observances, and produced a strong tendency to substitute mystic Judaism in the place of traditional Rabbinic Judaism. For example, Shabbat, the Jewish Sabbath, began to be looked upon as the embodiment of God in temporal life, and every ceremony performed on that day was considered to have an influence upon the superior world.

Elements of the Zohar crept into the liturgy of the 16th and 17th centuries, and the religious poets not only used the allegorism and symbolism of the Zohar in their compositions, but even adopted its style, e.g. the use of erotic terminology to illustrate the relations between man and God. Thus, in the language of some Jewish poets, the beloved one's curls indicate the mysteries of the Deity; sensuous pleasures, and especially intoxication, typify the highest degree of divine love as ecstatic contemplation; while the wine-room represents merely the state through which the human qualities merge or are exalted into those of God.

The Zohar is also credited with popularizing de Leon's PaRDeS codification of biblical exegesis.

=== Christian mysticism ===
According to the Jewish Encyclopedia, "The enthusiasm felt for the Zohar was shared by many Christian scholars, such as Giovanni Pico della Mirandola, Johann Reuchlin, Aegidius of Viterbo, etc., all of whom believed that the book contained proofs of the truth of Christianity. They were led to this belief by the analogies existing between some of the teachings of the Zohar and certain Christian dogmas, such as the fall and redemption of man, and the dogma of the Trinity, which seems to be expressed in the Zohar in the following terms:

The Ancient of Days has three heads. He reveals himself in three archetypes, all three forming but one. He is thus symbolized by the number Three. They are revealed in one another. [These are:] first, secret, hidden 'Wisdom'; above that the Holy Ancient One; and above Him the Unknowable One. None knows what He contains; He is above all conception. He is therefore called for man 'Non-Existing' [Ayin] (Zohar, iii. 288b).

According to the Jewish Encyclopedia, "...the Christian scholars who were deluded by the similarity of these teachings to certain Christian dogmas deemed it their duty to propagate the Zohar."

== Commentaries ==
- The first known commentary on the book of Zohar, Ketem Paz, was written by Simeon Lavi of Libya.
- Another important and influential commentary on Zohar, 22-volume Or Yakar, was written by Moshe Cordovero of the Tzfat (i.e. Safed) kabbalistic school in the 16th century.
- The Vilna Gaon authored a commentary on the Zohar.
- Tzvi Hirsch of Zidichov wrote a commentary on the Zohar entitled Ateres Tzvi.
- A major commentary on the Zohar is the Sulam written by Yehuda Ashlag.
- A full translation of the Zohar into Hebrew was made by the late Daniel Frish of Jerusalem under the title Masok MiDvash.

== English translations ==
- Berg, Michael, The Zohar (23-vol. set). The Kabbalah Centre International Inc., 2003. Complete 23-volume English translation from the original Aramaic, with commentary and annotations.
- Matt, Daniel C., Nathan Wolski, & Joel Hecker, trans., The Zohar: Pritzker Edition (12 vols.) Stanford: Stanford University Press, 2004–2017.
- Matt, Daniel C., Zohar: Annotated and Explained. Woodstock, Vt.: SkyLights Paths Publishing Co., 2002. (Selections)
- Matt, Daniel C., Zohar: The Book of Enlightenment. New York: Paulist Press, 1983. (Selections)
- Scholem, Gershom, ed., Zohar: The Book of Splendor. New York: Schocken Books, 1963. (Selections)
- Sperling, Harry and Maurice Simon, eds., The Zohar (5 vols.). London: Soncino Press, 1930.
- Tishby, Isaiah, ed., The Wisdom of the Zohar: An Anthology of Texts (3 vols.). Oxford: Oxford University Press, 1989. Translated from the Hebrew by David Goldstein.

== See also ==
- Baqashot
- Hermetica
