= Correggio (disambiguation) =

Correggio may refer to:

== Places ==
- Correggio, Emilia-Romagna, Italy

== People ==
- Antonio da Correggio (1489–1534), Italian Renaissance painter
- Giovanni Mercurio da Correggio (c. 1451 – after 1506), Italian preacher
- Niccolò da Correggio (1450–1508), Italian poet
- Joseph Kaspar Correggio (1870–1962), German painter

== Other ==
- Correggio, a tragedy written by Adam Oehlenschläger in 1811
