= Daniel Matt =

Daniel Matt is the name of:

- Danny Matt (1927–2013), military officer
- Daniel C. Matt, Kabbalah scholar
