= Oration on the Dignity of Man =

Public discourse by Giovanni Pico della Mirandola

Oratio de hominis dignitate
- Author: Giovanni Pico della Mirandola
- Language: Latin
- Genre: Public discourse
- Publication date: 1496
- Publication place: Duchy of Mirandola

The Oration on the Dignity of Man (Latin: Oratio de hominis dignitate) is a public discourse composed in 1486 by Pico della Mirandola, an Italian scholar and philosopher of the Renaissance. It remained unpublished until 1496. The Pico Project–a collaboration between the University of Bologna and Brown University–and others have called it the "Manifesto of the Renaissance". In brief, the "dignity" described is that a human can become anything they desire.

== Biography ==
Pico, who belonged to the family that had long dwelt in the Castle of Mirandola, left his share of the ancestral principality to his two brothers to devote himself wholly to study. When he was 14, in 1477, he went to Bologna accompanied by his mother to study canon law and fit himself for the ecclesiastical career. Following his mother's death in 1478, in 1479 Pico requested from the Marquess of Mantua a free passage to Ferrara, where he would devote himself to the study of philosophy and theology. He spent the following seven years variously in Ferrara, Padua, Florence and Paris, studying Greek, Latin, Hebrew, Syriac and Arabic at the chief universities of Italy and France.

== Content ==
=== The potential of human achievement ===
Pico's Oration attempted to remap the human landscape to center all attention on human capacity and human perspective. Arriving in a place near Florence, he taught the amazing capacity of human achievement. "Pico himself had a massive intellect and studied everything there was to be studied in the university curriculum of the Renaissance; the Oration in part is meant to be a preface to a massive compendium of all the intellectual achievements of humanity, a compendium that never appeared because of Pico's early death."

=== Dignity of the liberal arts ===
Pico intended to speak in front of an invited audience of scholars and clerics of the dignity of the liberal arts about the glory of angels. Of these angels, he spoke of three divisions in particular: the Seraphim, Cherubim and Thrones. These are the highest three choirs in the angelic hierarchy, each one embodying a different virtue. The Seraphim represent charity. In order to obtain the status of Seraphim, Pico declares that one must "burn with love for the Creator". The Cherubim represent intelligence. This status is obtained through contemplation and meditation. Finally, Thrones represent justice, which is obtained by being just in ruling over "inferior things". Of these three, the Thrones are the lowest, Cherubim the middle and Seraphim the highest. In this speech, Pico emphasizes the Cherubim and that by embodying the values of the Cherub, one can be equally prepared for "the fire of the Seraphim and the judgement of the Thrones". This deviation into the hierarchy of angels makes sense when Pico makes his point that a philosopher "is a creature of Heaven and not of earth" because a philosopher is capable of obtaining any one of the angelic statuses.

=== Importance of human quest for knowledge ===
In the Oration, Pico justified the importance of the human quest for knowledge within a Neoplatonic framework. He writes that after God had created all creatures, He conceived of the desire for another sentient being who would appreciate all His works, but there was no longer any room in the chain of being; all the possible slots from angels to worms had been filled. So, God created man such that he had no specific slot in the chain. Instead, men were capable of learning from and imitating any existing creature. When man philosophizes, he ascends the chain of being towards the angels, and communion with God. When he fails to exercise his intellect, he vegetates. Pico did not fail to notice that this system made philosophers like himself among the most dignified human creatures.

The idea that men could ascend the chain of being through the exercise of their intellectual capacities was a profound endorsement of the dignity of human existence in this earthly life. The root of this dignity lay in his assertion that only human beings could change themselves through their own free will, whereas all other changes in nature were the result of some outside force acting on whatever it is that undergoes change. He observed from history that philosophies and institutions were always in change, making man's capacity for self-transformation the only constant. Coupled with his belief that all of creation constitutes a symbolic reflection of the divinity of God, Pico's philosophies had a profound influence on the arts, helping to elevate writers and painters from their medieval role as mere artisans to the Renaissance ideal of the artist as creative genius.

=== Introduction to Pico's 900 theses ===
The Oration also served as an introduction to Pico's 900 theses, which he believed would provide a complete and sufficient basis for the discovery of all knowledge, and hence a model for mankind's ascent of the chain of being. The 900 Theses are a good example of humanist syncretism, because Pico combined Platonism, Neoplatonism, Aristotelianism, Hermeticism and Kabbalah. They also included 72 theses describing what Pico believed to be a complete system of physics. Pico also argued in this oration that his youth should not discredit any of the content of his 900 theses (he was in his twenties).

Pico had "cosmic ambitions": in his letters and early texts, he hinted that debate of the 900 theses (the first printed book ever universally banned by the Church) might trigger Christ's Second Coming and the end of the world. Innocent VIII condemned the theses in general but declared the author to be free from censure. This was written on 5 August 1487, but it was not issued until the following December. In a letter to Lorenzo dated 27 August 1489, Pico affirms among other things some of his theses refer purely to profane matters and were never intended for general reading, but instead for private debate among the learned.

=== Mystical vocation of humanity ===
In the Oration, Pico argues, in the words of Pier Cesare Bori, that "human vocation is a mystical vocation that has to be realized following a three-stage approach, which comprehends necessarily moral transformation, intellectual research and final perfection in identity with the absolute reality. This paradigm is universal because it can be retraced in every tradition."

== Delivery ==
Pico was prevented from holding his Oration. It was penned as the opening speech for a public disputation of his 900 theses, planned for early 1487, but Pope Innocent VIII suspended the event and instead set up a commission to examine the theses for heresy.
