= Isaac ben Samuel of Acre =

Jewish kabbalist

Isaac ben Samuel of Acre (fl. 13th–14th century) (Hebrew: יצחק בן שמואל דמן עכו, Yitzhak ben Shmuel d'min Akko) was a Jewish kabbalist from Acre who fled to Spain.

According to Chaim Joseph David Azulai, Isaac ben Samuel was a pupil of Nachmanides.

== View of the Zohar ==
Isaac ben Samuel was at the Crusader-controlled town of Acre when town was taken by a Mamluk army led by Al-Ashraf Khalil. He was arrested and thrown into prison with many other Jews, but escaped the massacre, and in 1305 went to Spain. Abraham Zacuto states in his Yuḥasin, that Moses de Leon discovered the Zohar in the time of Isaac of Acre.

However, Isaac doubted the authenticity of the Zohar and made inquiries about it of Naḥmanides' pupils, without, however, any satisfactory result. When Isaac met Moses of Leon at Valladolid, the latter took an oath that he had a copy of the Zohar written by Shimon bar Yochai himself in his house at Ávila. However, de Leon died before he could return to Ávila, and Isaac, more than ever desirous of obtaining the truth, consulted at Ávila a man named David Dafan Korpo.

Dafan told Isaac that Moses of Leon's wife and daughter had revealed to the wife of a certain Joseph of Ávila that Moses of Leon had written the book himself, an anecdote accepted as historical by Heinrich Graetz, Hebrew University professor Yeshayahu Leibowitz, and academic authorities on the Kabbalah such as Gershom Scholem and Berkeley professor Daniel C. Matt, while Landauer claims it to be apocryphal and tries to demonstrate that the Zohar was discovered much later.

Issac's testimony, which appeared in the first edition (1566) of Sefer Yuchasin, was censored from the second edition (1580) and remained absent from all editions thereafter until its restoration nearly 300 years later in the 1857 edition.

The Yuchasin's copy of Isaac's account does not include any final conclusion. However, in Isaac's Otzar HaHayim he assumes that the Zohar was written by Rabbi Shimon bar Yochai.

== Quotations and works in Kabbalah ==
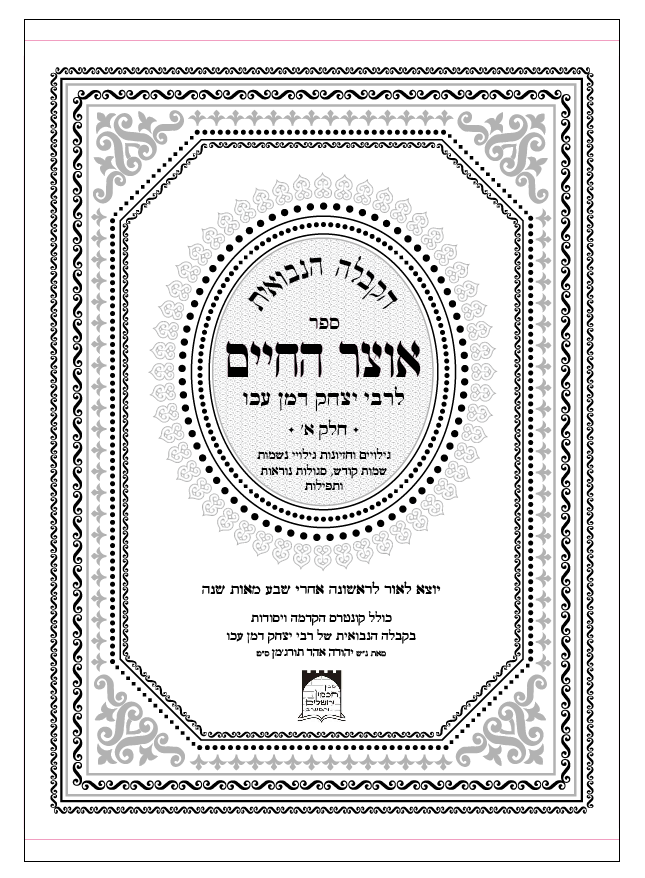
The Jerusalem edition of Otzar HaHayyim

Isaac of Acre is frequently quoted by Elijah de Vidas in his Reshit Ḥokmah, and by R. Hayyim Vital in his Megillat Setarim. He was an expert in composing the sacred names ("ẓerufim"), by the power of which angels were forced to reveal to him the great mysteries (Azulai, l.c.). According to Azulai he wrote many kabbalistic works. Those that are known are: Meirat Enayim, a kabbalistic commentary on Naḥmanides' commentary to the Pentateuch; Sefer ha-Sodot, mentioned in the Nobelot Ḥokmah of Joseph Solomon Delmedigo; Ketem Paz, a kabbalistic work mentioned by Moses Botarel in his commentary to the Sefer Yezirah, and the author of which he calls "Isaac ben Samuel," identified by Michael (Or ha-Ḥayyim, No. 1088) with Isaac ben Samuel of Acre; Liḳḳuṭe Shoshanim, possibly a compendium of the Sefer ha-Sodot. It appears from the Reshit Ḥokmah that Isaac of Acre wrote also a book on ethics. The Me'irat 'Enayim was published in a critical edition by Amos Goldreich in 1983. His "Otzar HaHayyim" was published in 2020 by Machon Hokhmei Yerushalayim.

== Theory of age of the Universe ==
Isaac's words have been used by some to calculate the age of the universe as being 15,340,500,000 years old. Notably, Rabbi Aryeh Kaplan arrived at this conclusion based on one view which holds that the author of Sefer HaTemunah believed that there were 42,000 years prior to the biblical Adam, based on the idea that we would be in the seventh 7,000 year Shmitah cycle, in conjunction with the idea that according to Isaac, years prior to Adam should be calculated as "divine years," which, based on a verse from Psalms stating, "A thousand years in Your sight are but as yesterday" (Psalm 90:4), yields an equivalent of 365,250 solar years. Kaplan then multiplies these figures and arrives at the said number. According to Kaplan, "From calculations based on the expanding universe and other cosmological observations, modern science has concluded that the Big Bang occurred approximately 15 billion years ago. But here we see the same figure presented in a Torah source written over seven hundred years ago!" The scientific estimation places the occurrence of the Big Bang at 13.799 ± 0.021 billion years ago.

Kaplan's interpretation of Isaac's views has been contested. Rabbi Gil Student and Rabbi Ari Kahn describe some objections, citing sources which disagree, including the argument that the author of Sefer HaTemunah actually believed we were in the sixth, not seventh Shmitah, and that Isaac himself said that we were in the second, not seventh Shmitah, which would change the calculation dramatically, and bringing up the Arizal who was of the view that the matters discussed are spiritual and should not be applied to calculate physical years.

== Jewish Encyclopedia bibliography ==
- Grätz, Gesch. 3d ed., vii. 186, 211, 427–428;
- Abraham Zacuto, Yuḥasin, ed. Filipowski, pp. 95, 96, London, 1857;
- Azulai, Shem ha-Gedolim, p. 54;
- Jellinek, Beiträge, ii., xiii.;
- Steinschneider, Cat. Bodl. col. 2523;
- M. H. Landauer, in Litteraturblatt des Orients, vi. 182, 224, 509
- Michael, Heimann Joseph, (1891) Or ha-Ḥayyim, Frankfort-on-the-Main (in Hebrew), p. 513, No. 1088.
