= Flavius Mithridates =

Flavius Mithridates was an Italian Jewish humanist scholar, who flourished at Rome in the second half of the 15th century. He is said to be from Sicily, and was a Christian convert, known for preaching impressively if tendentiously. He also had a knowledge of Arabic.

== Biography ==
About 1486 he lived at Fratta, near Perugia, in the house of Giovanni Pico della Mirandola, whom he instructed in Aramaic. He is now best known as the translator for Pico della Mirandola of the Bibliotheca Cabalistica, a large compilation of cabbalistic literature. Modern scholarly reconsideration of this work have found it somewhat erratic and containing interpolations.

He also translated into Latin Maimonides' epistle on resurrection, Levi ben Gershon's commentary on the Song of Solomon, and Judah Romano's "Ma'amar ha-Hawayah ha-Heḳḳeshiyyah," or "Sermo de Generatione Syllogismorum Simplicium et Compositorum in Omni Figura." Flavius was the author of "De Tropis Hebraicis," an original work in Latin on Hebrew accents, which was praised by Sebastian Münster and Imbonatus.

== Identity ==
Some scholars have thought, but without sufficient reason, that Flavius is identical with the cabalist Johanan Aleman ben Isaac, a contemporary and associate of Pico della Mirandola, who taught him from the late 1480s.

Seidman notes Mithridates's "proliferation of identitites", listing the following:

- Gugielmo Raimondo Moncada
- Flavius Mithridates
- Siculus
- Romanus
- Chaldeus
- Samuel ben Nissim ibn Faraj
- YHWH (which Mithridates claimed based on kabbalistic gematria)

== Bibliography ==
- Giulio Busi (ed.), with Simonetta M. Bondoni and Saverio Campanini, The Great Parchment: Flavius Mithridates’ Latin Translation, the Hebrew Text, and an English Version, "The Kabbalistic Library of Giovanni Pico della Mirandola" - 1, Nino Aragno Editore, Torino 2004.
- Saverio Campanini (ed.), The Book of Bahir. Flavius Mithridates' Latin Translation, the Hebrew Text, and an English Version, with a Foreword by G. Busi, "The Kabbalistic Library of Giovanni Pico della Mirandola" - 2, Nino Aragno Editore, Torino 2005.
- Saverio Campanini, Talmud, Philosophy, Kabbalah: A Passage from Pico della Mirandola’s Apologia and its Source, in M. Perani (ed.), The Words of a Wise Man’s Mouth are Gracious. Festschrift for Günter Stemberger on the Occasion of His 65th Birthday, W. De Gruyter Verlag, Berlin – New York 2005, pp. 429–447.
- Mauro Perani (ed.), Gugliemo Raimondo Moncada alias Flavio Mitridate. Un ebreo converso siciliano. Atti del Convegno Internazionale Caltabellotta (Agrigento) 23-24 ottobre 2004, Officina di Studi Medievali, Palermo 2008.
- Michela Andreatta - Saverio Campanini, Bibliographia Mithridatica, in Mauro Perani (ed.), Guglielmo Raimondo Moncada alias Flavio Mitridate, Palermo 2008, pp. 241–257.
- Saverio Campanini, Latin into Hebrew (and Back): Flavius Mithridates and His Latin Translations From Judah Romano, in A. Fidora – H. J. Hames – Y. Schwartz (edd.), Latin into Hebrew. Texts and Studies, Volume Two: Texts in Contexts, Brill, Leiden – Boston 2013, pp. 161–193.
- Saverio Campanini, תפלה לעני / Oratio pauperis. A Kabbalistic Prayer attributed to Todros ha-Levi Abulafia in Mithridates’ Latin Translation, in «Iberia Judaica» 6 (2014), pp. 23–34.
- Saverio Campanini, Who Was Rabbi Mithridates? Following a Neglected Trail, in F. Buzzetta (ed.), Cabbala, Cahiers Accademia 11 (2018), pp. 9–22.
- Saverio Campanini, Four Short Kabbalistic Treatises, "The Kabbalistic Library of Giovanni Pico della Mirandola" 6, Fondazione Palazzo Bondoni Pastorio, Castiglione delle Stiviere 2019.
