= Pier Cesare Bori =

Italian religious historian

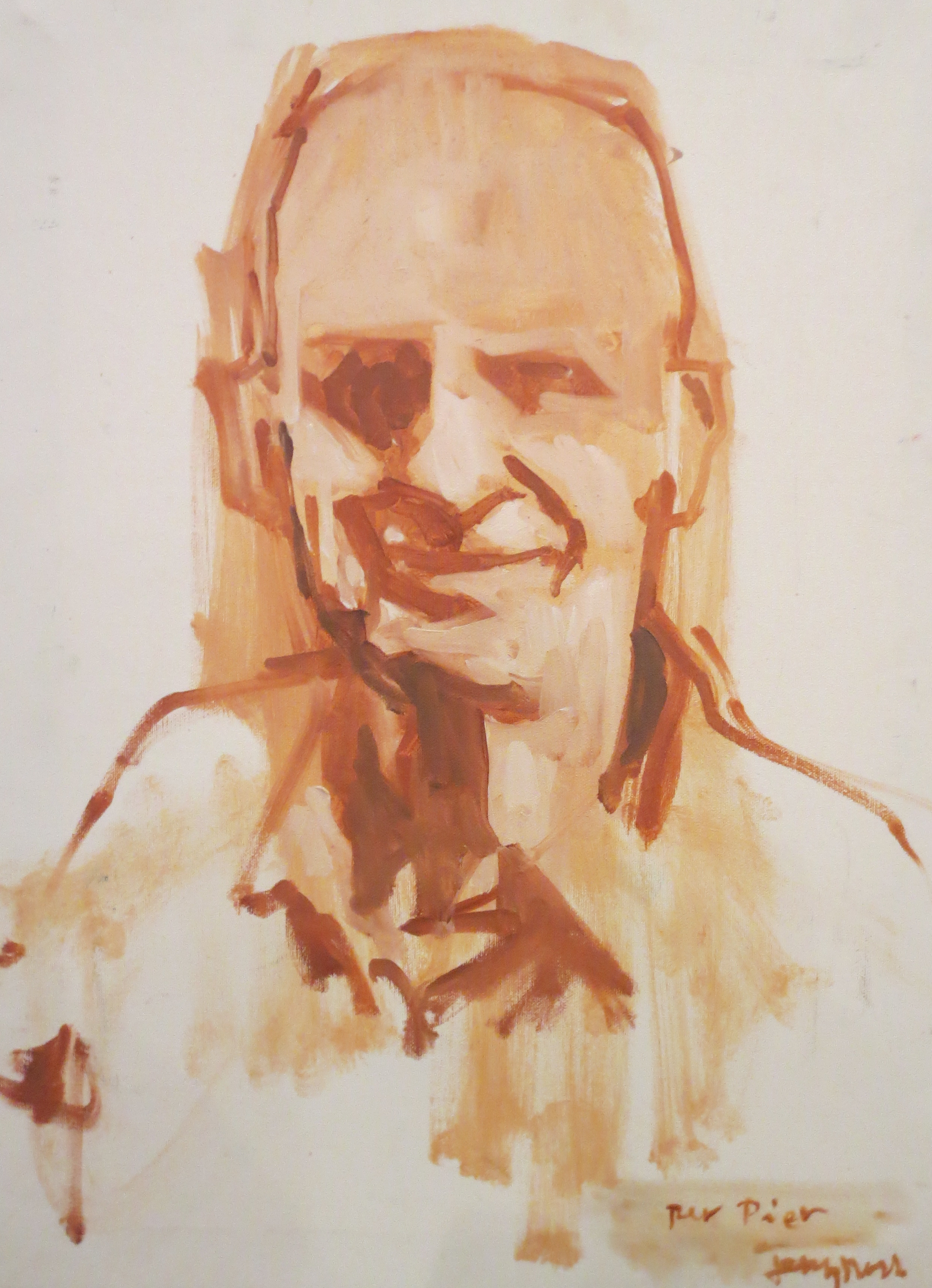
PierCesraeBori by Pittore44 (Own work) CC BY-SA 3.0, via Wikimedia Commons

Pier Cesare Bori (3 February 1937 in Casale Monferrato – 4 November 2012 in Bologna) was a professor of religious history, moral philosophy, and multiculturalism at the University of Bologna. He was also a leading Italian Quaker and Tolstoy scholar. For many years he kept a writing studio in Livergnano near Bologna.

== Biography ==
Bori studied jurisprudence, theology and biblical studies, and in 1970 became a professor at the 'Alma Mater Studiorum', the University of Bologna, holding the position of professor of "History of Christianity and the Churches" in the Faculty of Political Science, and teaching also "Moral Philosophy" and "Human rights in an era of globalization."

Director of the "Masters Degree Program in human rights and humanitarian intervention," he held the position of "visiting professor" in the United States, Tunisia, and Japan.

Bori is a late notable published scholar of Tolstoy. He wrote the introduction to War & Peace by Tolstoy, was featured in an article in L'Espresso, and had an extensive obituary in La Repubblica newspaper:

"A life for human rights has been turned off Pier Cesare Bori A few days ago, the appointment of the UNESCO Chair for religious pluralism and peace had said, "I'll do what my health will allow me." In his last will he asked for: "Silence, meditation and not speeches." The family mentioned in the funeral notice ad: "Killed by asbestos" (he died from mesothelioma caused by asbestos poisoning).

He had just been appointed holder of the UNESCO Chair for religious pluralism and peace.

He arrived in Bologna in the '70s, called by Giuseppe Alberigo Institute for Religious Sciences, he then followed the academic route: he was a lecturer until 1970 covering the post of Professor of the History of Christianity and the Church in political science, also teaching moral philosophy and human rights in globalization. He was Director, with Professor Gustavo Gozzi, the Masters in human rights and humanitarian intervention, he was a visiting professor in the U.S., Japan and Tunisia.

Among his writings are The Early Church (Paideia, 1974), The Golden Calf (Basic Books, 1983 ), and The Interpretation Infinite (Princeton, 1987). His research of Lev Tolstoy is summarized in The Other Tolstoy (Princeton), and in the translation from Russian by Thoughts for each day (Editions Culture of Peace).

Bori was a known scholar of the discourse on the human dignity of Giovanni Pico della Mirandola, a Renaissance figure.

Bori was born in Casale in 1937, he studied jurisprudence, theology, and biblical studies. On ethics intercultural published "For an ethical consensus between cultures" (Edward Arnold 1995) and "For ethical path between cultures" (New Italy 1996). From the experience with his students in prisons was born the book "lamp themselves".

Political science colleagues remembered him with pain. "For me it was a teacher," says the director of the Department Fabio Giusberti. "I'm losing a friend as well as a great scholar," says Gustavo Gozzi, the teacher who has worked alongside Bori for years on the issue of human rights, first with an undergraduate degree and then with the master. "It 'a huge loss, its contribution has always been extraordinary as evidenced by the many students who followed him and international awards. A magnificent life, his, marked by the encounter between cultures and civilizations." "A person who has always polite to peace and free search of spiritual fulfillment, "adds his friend and colleague touched Titian Bonazzi.(UTC)
