= Giovanni Mercurio da Correggio =

Italian itinerant preacher (1451-?)

Giovanni Mercurio da Correggio (Latin name: Iohannes Mercurius de Corigio; 1451 – ?) was an Italian itinerant preacher, Hermeticist, and alchemist. Due to his bizarre appearance in Rome on Palm Sunday 1484 he has been believed by some scholars to have not actually existed, but this has been contested with other reports that corroborate his eccentricities. His most notable follower was Lodovico Lazzarelli, an Italian humanist poet and alchemist, who writes his accounts of da Correggio in his Epistola Enoch.

== Biography ==
=== Early life ===
Giovanni da Correggio was born sometime around 1451 to a noble family in Bologna, and was likely the illegitimate son of a certain Antonio da Correggio (not the artist), who died in 1474. Da Correggio is also likely from the same feudal family that produced Niccolò da Correggio. He does not appear to have had any formal education in academics, oration, grammar, or rhetoric, but nevertheless went on to become a very eloquent wandering preacher.

The first account of da Correggio was on 12 November 1481 in Rome, where Lodovico Lazzarelli encountered him as an apocalyptic preacher trying to gain the attention of the pope (Sixtus IV) and the College of Cardinals. Lazzarelli was so taken in by da Correggio that he decided to become his pupil. This meeting is reported by Lazzarelli to have been a turning point in his life and studies. It is possible that Lazzarelli may have introduced da Correggio to Hermetic philosophy and writings.

=== Palm Sunday 1484 ===
On Palm Sunday, 11 April 1484 da Correggio is reported by Lazzarelli to have been in Rome dressed in rich garments and gold with four servants. Lazzarelli reports that da Correggio then exits the city of Rome, and returns riding on a white donkey in imitation of Jesus. He is wearing blood-stained linen garments, a crown of thorns, on top of which is a silver crescent moon shaped disk. He then travels up to Saint Peter's Basilica and walks right up to the altar. Da Correggio places upon the altar his mystical apparel and a paper entitled The Eternal Gospel, knelt to pray, and then left. He proclaimed that he was "Giovanni Mercurio da Correggio" (or the Latin equivalent: "Iohannes Mercurius de Corigio"), "the angel of wisdom," "Poimandres" (or Pimander, a Hermetic manifestation of the mind of God), and "the most perfect manifestation of Jesus Christ." He distributed scrolls that read: "Ego Joannes Mercurius de Corigio, sapientiae angelus Pimanderque in summo ac maximo spiritus Jesu Chrisi excessu, hanc aquam regni pro paucis, sic super omnes magna voce evangelizo."

According to Lazzarelli da Correggio did all this completely unaccosted.

The only other account of da Correggio's Palm Sunday appearance in Rome was written by Abraham Farissol, an Italian Jewish scholar and scribe, in his Magen Avraham, who was in Rome at the time. According to Farissol da Correggio never even made it to the altar, but was arrested for heresy. According to Farissol da Correggio also calls himself "Son of God," "Hermes Trismegistus," "Enoch," and "Methuselah." Later da Correggio escapes from prison, possibly with the assistance of some friends.

According to both Lazzarelli and Farissol, after leaving Rome, da Correggio returns to Bologna to his wife, Elana Marie, and five children. Upon arriving in Bologna da Correggio is arrested again with new charges of heresy, but either escapes from prison in Bologna or is released.

=== Later life ===
After 1484, Giovanni da Correggio begins to wander from city to city preaching. Accounts of his appearances throughout Italy are scarce and scattered.

The first appearance of da Correggio since Palm Sunday is on 4 July 1486 in Florence while on his way to Naples. Lazzarelli was in the court of Ferdinand I of Naples at the time, and Ferdinand I requested to meet with da Correggio. While in Florence da Correggio is ordered to be arrested by Lorenzo de' Medici and accosted by a Franciscan inquisitor. It is unclear if da Correggio ever made it to Naples.

He is reported to have been in Cesena in 1484, but it is unclear if this was prior to or after his appearance in Rome on Palm Sunday. It could easily be both, as he would have had to travel through Cesena to get from Rome to Bologna if he did not travel through Florence. Additionally he is reported to have been in Rome again 1492 in hopes of meeting with Pope Alexander VI. In Rome he begins to proclaim himself to be the "Younger Hermes" (implying that he is either the son of Hermes Trismegistus or Hermes Trismegistus reincarnated, hence the adoption of "Mercuio" to his name). In 1494 he is reported to be in Lucca vainly trying to get to Florence. He apparently gets to visit Florence again in 1496. He is reported in Venice in 1497. In 1499 he is reported in Rome again seeking a meeting with the pope, as well as in Cesena on his way to Milan. While in Cesena he is seen wearing sackcloth and accompanied by his wife and five children.

While da Correggio was originally from a noble family, and he seems to have been wealthy given the lavish and rich garments he wore in Rome in 1484 before he paraded around in imitation of Jesus, he appears to be truly destitute beginning in 1499. From this point forward he is always seen traveling with his entire household, begging on the streets, and dressed in sackcloth. It is possible he could have wasted his fortunes in alchemical pursuits, which was not uncommon in the 15th century. Hanegraaff puts forth the conjecture that Lazzarelli not only introduced da Correggio to Hermeticism, but may have also introduced him to alchemy sometime after 1495. In 1495 Lazzarelli met Johannes Rigaud de Branchiis, an alchemist, and decided to be de Branchiis' pupil as well. (Lazzarelli dedicated his transcription of Petrus Bonus' Pretiosa Margarita Novella to his "teacher Joannes," though it is unclear if this dedication was directed toward de Branchiis or da Correggio; but it is certain that the Epistola Enoch, credited to Lazzarelli, is dedicated to da Correggio). Despite being destitute or impending destitution that same year, 1499, da Correggio published his Against the Barbarians, the Turks, and the Scyths (it is unclear if he published this before or after becoming a beggar), which he presented in Lyons to King Louis XII in 1501. Sometime after visiting France he published a plague tract.

It is unclear when da Correggio traveled to Ferrara, but Farissol reports to have seen him in Ferrara. This is appropriate as Carlo Sosenna, a humanist scholar, poet, and magician at the University of Ferrara, writes a commentary on a sonnet attributed to da Correggio. It is known that Sosenna was friendly with the Duke of Ferrara, Ercole I d'Este, as both held an interest in astrology and divination. Ruderman speculates that da Correggio may have met the duke through Sosenna.

Lazzarelli, Farissol, and Sosenna are the only three persons to have written about anything concerning Giovanni da Correggio who also were contemporary with him. There is another notable contemporary to have written about da Correggio, but it is unlikely he ever encountered the man in person. Johannes Trithemius writes about da Correggio boasting of himself as knowing all the learnings of the ancient Hebrews, Greeks, and Latins. It is unlikely Trithemius ever met da Correggio, or even traveled to Italy. It is more probable that he learned of da Correggio's existence through the writings of Lazzarelli, which were circulated among scholars and alchemists in Germany at that time. It is known that Heinrich Cornelius Agrippa, a notorious German alchemist, had access to Lazzarelli's Hermetic writings, as he quotes a portion of Lazzarelli's Crater Hermetiis in his The Three Books of Occult Philosophy.

The last that is ever heard of da Correggio is in 1506 while he was meeting with Pope Julius II in Rome. Da Correggio had just published his De Quercu Iulii Pontificis, Sive De Lapide Philosophico (On the Oak of Pope Julius, or On the Philosopher's Stone), and presented it to the pope. Given da Correggio's state of poverty, Hanegraaff conjectures that De Quercu was a desperate last attempt by da Correggio to secure a source of funding to provide for himself and his family. He appeals to Julius II by mentioning that they had met before face-to-face in Savona (possibly before Julius II was pope), as if attempting to imply a stronger connection between the two men. Mostly da Correggio appeals to Julius II by regularly using the oak tree as an emblem of majesty, protection, power, and beauty (Julius II was formerly Giuliano della Rovere; Rovere meaning oak), describing the pope's oak as a sort of world tree. He makes use a popular alchemical symbol, the phoenix (often associated with the philosopher's stone), which he says perches on the upper branches of the papal tree. Da Correggio then goes on to discuss the philosopher's stone and quintessence, and all the virtues therein. He implies that he possesses these secrets, if only the pope would give him and his family protection. Da Correggio writes De Quercu as if he is the conduit of a divine entity, imploring the pope's help in the third person: "Give our Giovanni Mercurio your help and I will help you." It is uncertain if Julius II ever secured any help for da Correggio, but given that there are no other documentations concerning Giovanni da Correggio after this meeting with the pope, then it can be surmised that Julius did not assist da Correggio and he and his family perished in poverty sometime thereafter.

== Controversy of Existence ==
The first modern authority to describe Giovanni da Correggio was Kurt Ohly while he was researching Lazzarelli's Epistola Enoch in 1938. Ohly found the man to be so strange that he concluded that da Correggio was a fictitious invention of Lazzarelli. Ohly came to this conclusion because of the scarcity of other accounts concerning da Correggio.

Paul Oskar Kristeller was the next authority to write about da Correggio while researching Hermetic documents and manuscripts in the Viterbo Municipal Library. Kristeller found other accounts of da Correggio in other cities in the latter half of the 15th century, citing namely a letter from the Medici Archives reporting da Correggio was in Lucca in 1494. Other sources found by Kristeller include the Harley Manuscript 4081 in the British Museum, better known as De Quercu, as well as da Correggio's sonnet with Sosenna's commentary. Kristeller dissented against Ohly's conclusion, now concluding that Giovanni da Correggio had in fact existed.

Since Kristeller other scholars have brought to the forefront other accounts of da Correggio. Among them are David Ruderman in Abraham Farissol's Magen Avraham.

It is generally agreed upon that Giovanni da Correggio did in fact exist.

== See also ==
- Contemporary Italian Renaissance philosophers: Marsilio Ficino, Lodovico Lazzarelli, Giovanni Pico della Mirandola
- Hermetica (philosophical writings attributed to Hermes Trismegistus)
- Hermeticism
- Renaissance humanism
- Renaissance philosophy
- Renaissance magic
