= Daniel C. Matt =

American academic

Daniel Chanan Matt (born 1950) is an author, teacher and scholar of Kabbalah. He received his Ph.D. from Brandeis University and served as a professor at the Graduate Theological Union in Berkeley from 1979-2000. He has also taught at Stanford University and the Hebrew University of Jerusalem.

Matt's fascination with the Zohar began during his junior year at Brandeis University when he read his first few lines of the Zohar. He continued his studies of it at Hebrew University in Jerusalem and developed a deep appreciation for it.

Matt identifies three key innovations that Kabbalah introduced to Judaism: the concept of God as infinitely beyond comprehension, the integration of feminine aspects alongside traditional masculine depictions of God, and the idea that God is in some way incomplete without human participation. He notes that Kabbalah challenges conventional understandings of God and the human-divine relationship, and that the Zohar encourages new interpretations of the Torah, embracing creativity and the idea that the Bible’s meaning is not fixed. In his book God and the Big Bang, Matt examines the relationship between Jewish mysticism and the Big Bang theory. He explores how the theory challenges Jewish conceptions of God and whether it offers insights into spirituality. Matt draws parallels between the kabbalistic idea of the "breaking of the vessels," which signifies a loss of divine unity, and the physics concept of "broken symmetry," which describes a similar loss of unity in the universe. He argues that both kabbalists and physicists seek a deeper sense of unity, a theme reflected in their work.

Matt is best known for his multi-volume annotated translation, The Zohar: Pritzker Edition. In 1997, the Pritzker family asked him to translate the "Zohar" from Aramaic into English, and in 2000 he resigned his faculty position at the Graduate Theological Union to focus on this work, which took 18 years with the final volume published in 2017. He composed the first nine volumes of this twelve-volume series (covering the Zohar's main commentary on the Torah), and was the General Editor of the remaining three volumes (covering other sections of the Zohar). His annotated translation has been hailed as "a monumental contribution to the history of Jewish thought."

He teaches Zohar courses online.

== Publications (partial list) ==
- Daniel Chanan Matt, Zohar: The Book of Enlightenment. New York: Paulist Press, 1983, ISBN 978-0-8091-2387-2. (Selections)
- Daniel C. Matt, ed. Walking Humbly with God: The Life and Writings of Rabbi Hershel Jonah Matt, Hoboken, New Jersey: Ktav, 1993, ISBN 978-0-8812-5430-3.
- Daniel C. Matt, The Essential Kabbalah: The Heart of Jewish Mysticism, New York: HarperCollins, 1995, ISBN 0-06-251164-5.
- Daniel C. Matt, God & the Big Bang: Discovering Harmony Between Science and Spirituality, Woodstock, Vt.: Jewish Lights, 1996, ISBN 978-1-8790-4589-7; 2nd ed., 2016.
- Daniel C. Matt, Zohar: Annotated and Explained. Woodstock, Vt.: SkyLight Paths, 2002, ISBN 1-893361-51-9. (Selections)
- Daniel C. Matt, trans. and ed., The Zohar: Pritzker Edition, 9 vols. Stanford University Press, 2004–2016.
- Daniel C. Matt, Becoming Elijah: Prophet of Transformation. New Haven: Yale University Press, 2022, ISBN 978-0-3002-4270-6 (Jewish Lives series).

== Awards ==
- 2004: National Jewish Book Award for The Zohar: Pritzker Edition
- 2004: Koret Jewish Book Award for The Zohar: Pritzker Edition
- 2022: Rabbi Jonathan Sacks Book Prize for Becoming Elijah: Prophet of Transformation
