= Yohanan Alemanno =

Philosopher

Yohanan Alemanno (born in Constantinople or in Mantua, c. 1435 – died after 1504) was an Italian Jewish rabbi, noted Kabbalist, humanist philosopher, and exegete, and teacher of the Hebrew language to Italian humanists including Pico della Mirandola. He taught that the Kabbalah was divine magic.

He was a pupil of Judah Messer Leon, but departed from the Aristotelian sympathies of his teacher in the direction of neoplatonic thought.

== Works ==
His works include Hay ha-Olamim, Sefer sha`ar ha-heshek and a Cheshek Shlomo. He cites Judah ben Nissim Ibn Malkah.

Alemanno's writings show versatility. In his chief work, "Ḥesheḳ Shelomoh" (The Delight of Solomon), he evinces philosophic acumen as well as a wide acquaintance with both the Arabic and the Greek philosophers. The introduction to this work is a discourse on the artistic and intellectual attainments of the human race, all of which are combined in King Solomon, whom the author places above Plato and his fellows (compare "Sha'ar ha-ḤesheḲ," pp. 3–7). Excerpts from the introduction were published, with additions by Jacob Baruch ben Moses Ḥayyim, at Livorno in 1790. In the introduction to this work, Alemanno lists all the known writings of King Solomon; however, Senior Sachs researched and uncovered that twenty-one philosophical works on the list were written by Solomon ibn Gabirol, whose signature, "Solomon of Malaqa" was mis-interpreted.

Alemanno also wrote:

- "'Ene ha-'Edah" (The Eyes of the Congregation), a cabalistic commentary on the Torah (compare Gedaliah ibn Yaḥya's "Shalshelet ha-ḳ;ab-balah," ed. Warsaw, 1889, p. 86)
- "Ḥayye Olam" (Eternal Life), a treatise on immortality
- "LiḲḲutim Collectanea," a volume of about two hundred pages, containing stray thoughts, aphorisms, noteworthy quotations from rare authors, and exegetical remarks.
