= Giovanni Pico della Mirandola =

Italian Renaissance philosopher (1463–1494)

Pico della Mirandola
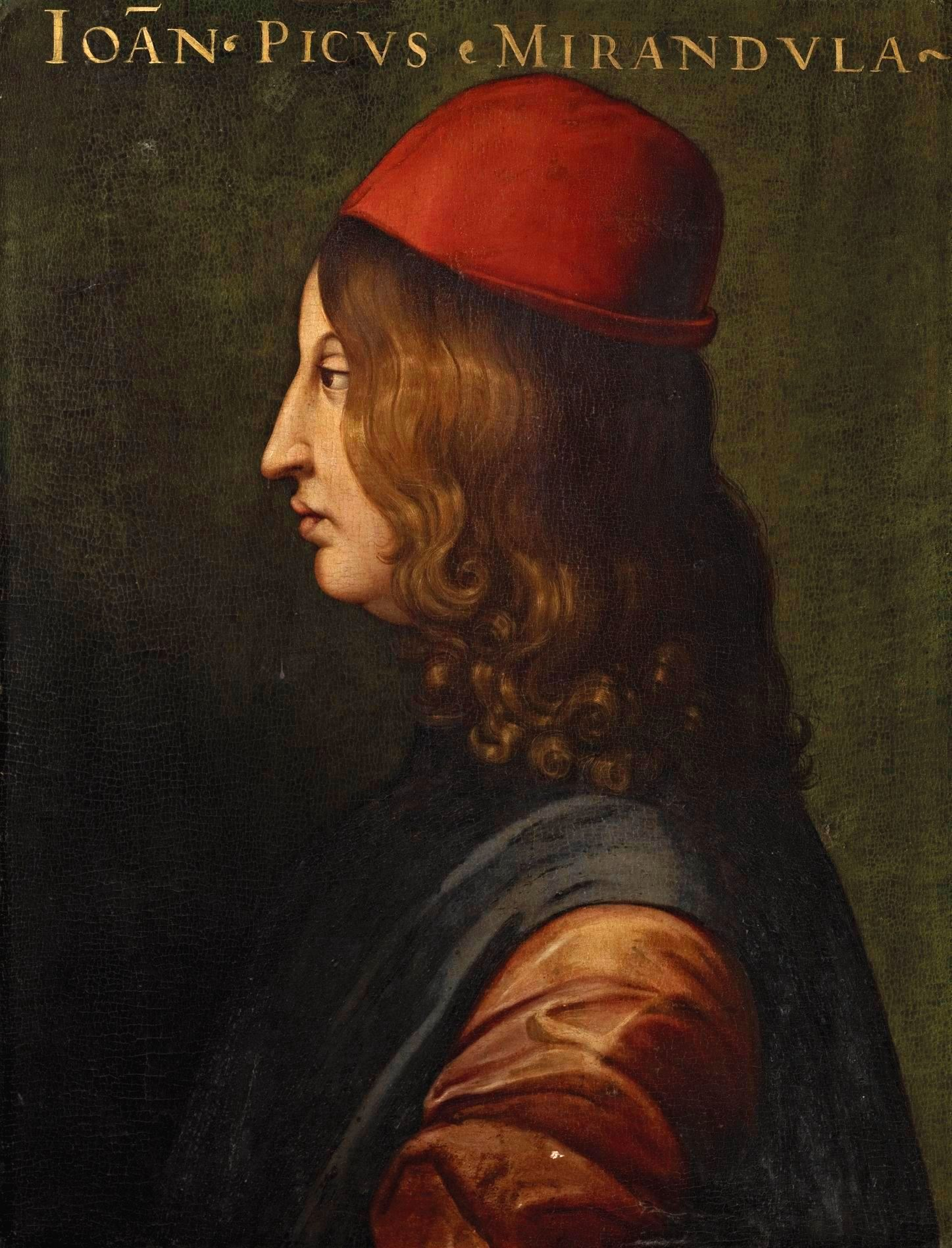
- Portrait from the Uffizi Gallery, in Florence
- Born: 24 February 1463; Mirandola, Duchy of Mirandola
- Died: 17 November 1494 (aged 31); Florence, Republic of Florence

Education
- Education: University of Bologna; University of Ferrara; University of Padua; University of Paris

Philosophical work
- Era: Renaissance philosophy
- Region: Western philosophy
- School: Renaissance philosophy; Christian humanism; Neoplatonism
- Main interests: Politics; history; religion; esotericism
- Notable ideas: Christian Kabbalah

Giovanni Pico della Mirandola (Note: English /ˈpiːkoʊ ˌdɛlə mɪˈrændələ, -ˈrɑːn-/ PEE-koh DEL-ə mirr-A(H)N-də-lə, Italian: [dʒoˈvanni ˈpiːko della miˈrandola]; Latin: Johannes Picus de Mirandula.) (24 February 1463 – 17 November 1494) was an Italian Renaissance nobleman and philosopher. He is famed for the events of 1486, when, at the age of 23, he proposed to defend 900 theses on religion, philosophy, natural philosophy, and magic against all comers, for which he wrote the Oration on the Dignity of Man, which has been called the "Manifesto of the Renaissance", and a key text of Renaissance humanism and of what has been called the "Hermetic Reformation". He was the founder of the tradition of Christian Kabbalah, a key tenet of early modern Western esotericism. The 900 Theses was the first printed book to be universally banned by the Church. Pico is sometimes seen as a proto-Protestant, because his 900 theses anticipated many Protestant views.

== Biography ==
=== Family ===
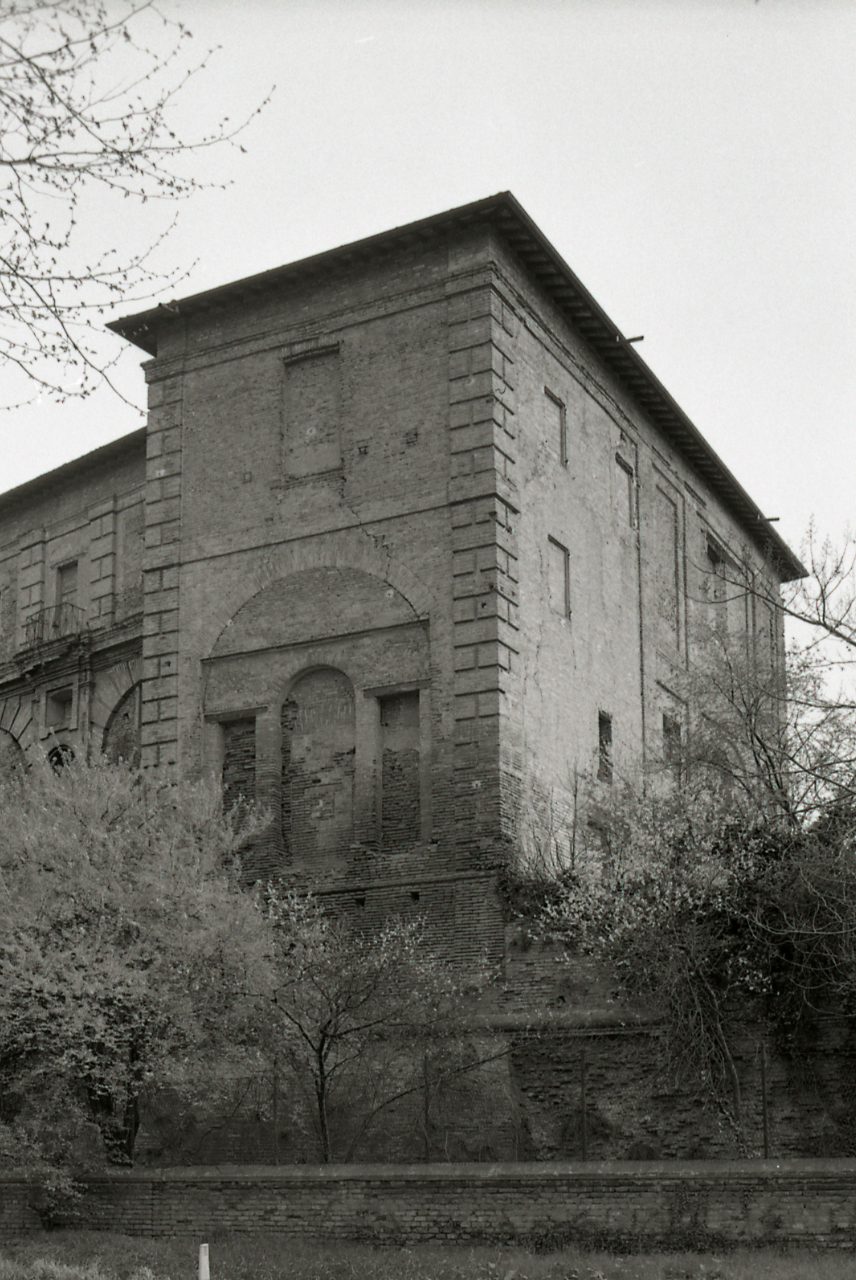
Castle of Mirandola in 1976

Giovanni was born at Mirandola, near Modena, the youngest son of Gianfrancesco I Pico, Lord of Mirandola and Count of Concordia, by his wife Giulia, daughter of Feltrino Boiardo, Count of Scandiano.

The family had long dwelt in the Castle of Mirandola in the Duchy of Modena.

He was a younger brother of Galeotto I. The Pico family would reign as dukes until Mirandola, an ally of Louis XIV of France, was conquered by his rival, Joseph I, Holy Roman Emperor, in 1708 and annexed to Modena by Duke Rinaldo d'Este, the exiled male line becoming extinct in 1747.

Giovanni's maternal family was singularly distinguished in the arts and scholarship of the Italian Renaissance. His cousin and contemporary was the poet Matteo Maria Boiardo, who grew up under the influence of his own uncle, the Florentine patron of the arts and scholar-poet Tito Vespasiano Strozzi.

Giovanni had a paradoxical relationship with his nephew Giovanni Francesco Pico della Mirandola, who was a great admirer of his uncle, yet published Examen vanitatis doctrinae gentium (1520) in opposition to the "ancient wisdom narrative" espoused by Giovanni, described by historian Charles B. Schmitt as an attempt "to destroy what his uncle had built."

=== Education ===
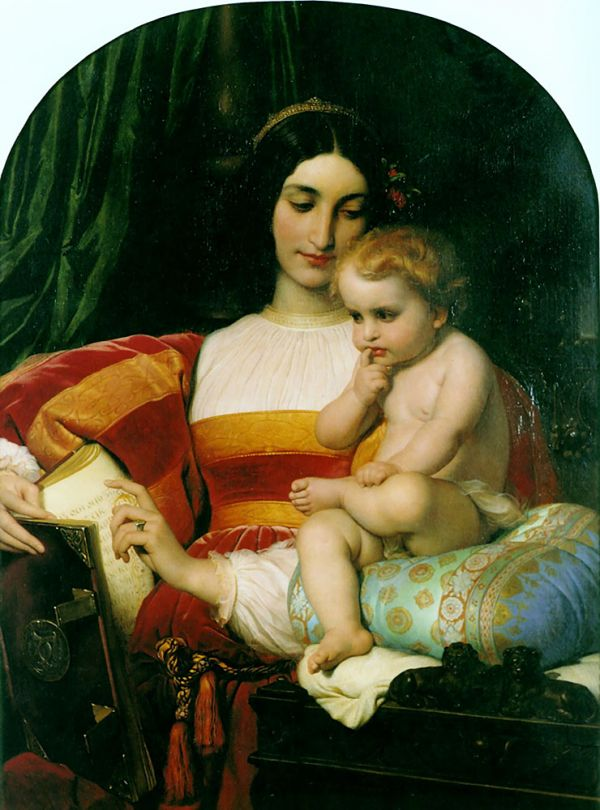
The Childhood of Pico della Mirandola by Hippolyte Delaroche, 1842, Musée d'Arts de Nantes

A precocious child with an exceptional memory, Giovanni was schooled in Latin and possibly Greek at a very early age. Intended for the Church by his mother, he was named a papal protonotary (probably honorary) at the age of 10 and in 1477, he went to Bologna to study canon law.

At the sudden death of his mother three years later, Pico renounced canon law and began to study philosophy at the University of Ferrara. During a brief trip to Florence, he met Angelo Poliziano, the courtly poet Girolamo Benivieni, and probably the young Dominican friar Girolamo Savonarola. For the rest of his life, he remained very close friends with all three. He may also have been a lover of Poliziano.

From 1480 to 1482, he continued his studies at the University of Padua, a major centre of Aristotelianism in Italy. Already proficient in Latin and Greek, he studied Hebrew and Arabic in Padua with Elia del Medigo, a Jewish Averroist, and read Aramaic manuscripts with him as well. Del Medigo also translated Judaic manuscripts from Hebrew into Latin for Pico, as he would continue to do for a number of years. Pico also wrote sonnets in Latin and Italian which, because of the influence of Savonarola, he destroyed at the end of his life.

He spent the next four years either at home or visiting humanist centres elsewhere in Italy. In 1485, he travelled to the University of Paris, the most important centre in Europe for scholastic philosophy and theology, and a hotbed of secular Averroism. It was probably in Paris that Giovanni began his 900 Theses and conceived the idea of defending them in public debate.

=== 900 Theses ===
THE CONCLUSIONS will not be disputed until after the Epiphany. In the meantime they will be published in all Italian universities. And if any philosopher or theologian, even from the ends of Italy, wishes to come to Rome for the sake of debating, his lord the disputer promises to pay the travel expenses from his own funds.

— Announcement at the end of the 900 Theses

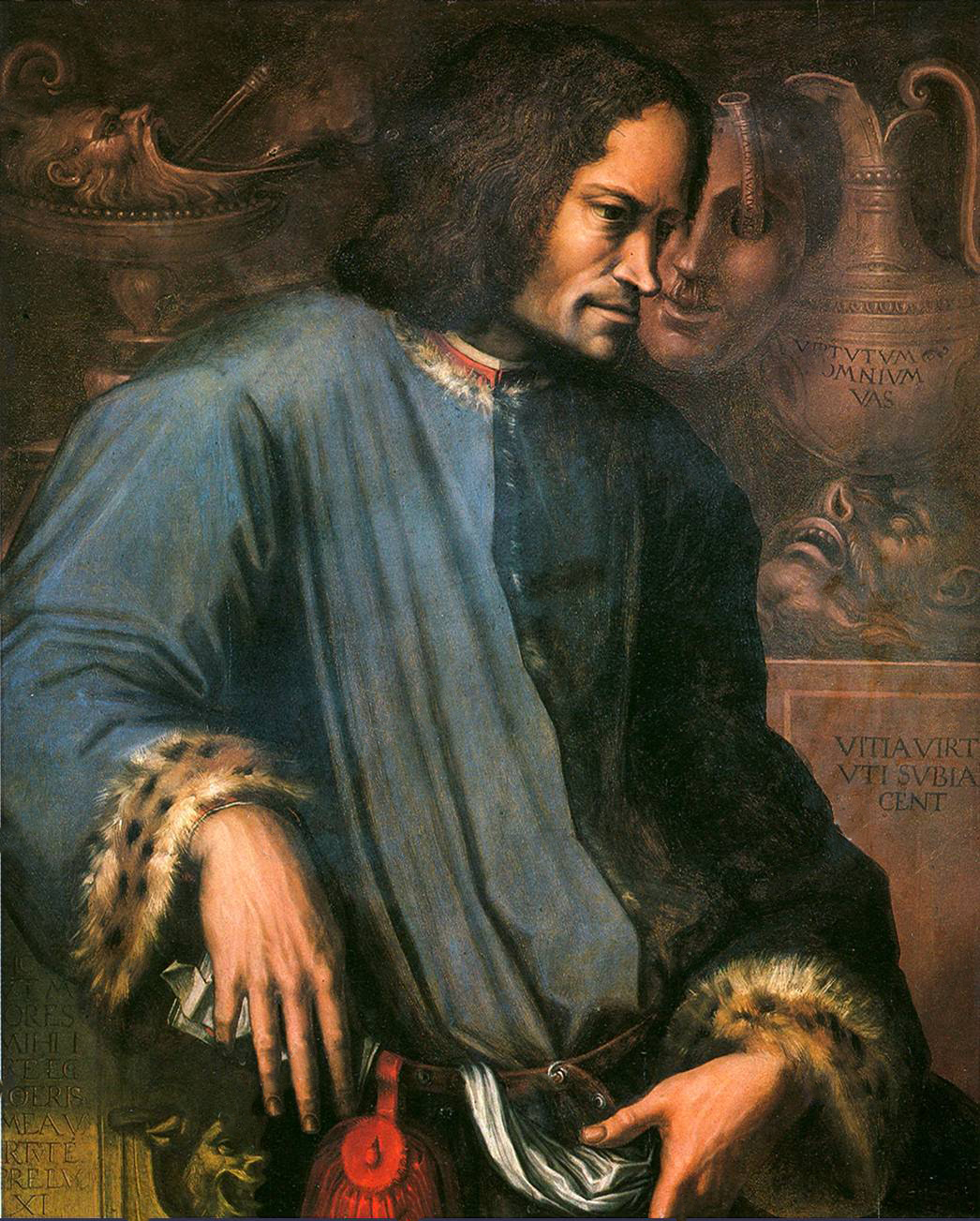
Lorenzo de' Medici by Giorgio Vasari, c. 1533–1534

During this time two life-changing events occurred. The first was when he returned to settle for a time in Florence in November 1484 and met Lorenzo de' Medici and Marsilio Ficino, who would later shape Pico's understanding of philosophy. It was an astrologically auspicious day that Ficino had chosen to publish his translations of the works of Plato from Greek into Latin, under Lorenzo's enthusiastic patronage. Pico appears to have charmed both men, and despite Ficino's philosophical differences, he was convinced of their Saturnine affinity and the divine providence of his arrival. Lorenzo would support and protect Pico until Lorenzo's death in 1492.

Soon after this stay in Florence, Pico was travelling on his way to Rome where he intended to publish his 900 Theses and prepare for a congress of scholars from all over Europe to debate them. Stopping in Arezzo he became embroiled in a love affair with the wife of one of Lorenzo de' Medici's cousins, which almost cost him his life. Giovanni attempted to run off with the woman, but he was caught, wounded and thrown into prison by her husband. He was released only upon the intervention of Lorenzo himself.

Pico spent several months in Perugia and nearby Fratta, recovering from his injuries. It was there, as he wrote to Ficino, that "divine Providence ... caused certain books to fall into my hands. They are Chaldean books ... of Esdras, of Zoroaster and of Melchior, oracles of the magi, which contain a brief and dry interpretation of Chaldean philosophy, but full of mystery." Pico was introduced in Perugia to the mystical Hebrew Kabbalah, which fascinated him, as did the late classical Hermetic writers, such as Hermes Trismegistus. The Kabbalah and Hermetica were thought in Pico's time to be as ancient as the Old Testament. One of Pico's tutors in Kabbalah was Rabbi Johannan Alemanno (1430s – c. 1510), who argued that the study and mastery of magic was to be regarded as the final stage of one's intellectual and spiritual education. According to Brian Copenhaver, Pico also relied on translations by Flavius Mithridates, a convert and prolific forger. Flavius supplied Pico with doctored Kabbalistic and seemingly pro-Christian texts, which persuaded Pico "that mysteries of the Kabbalah were keys to heaven for Christians."

This contact, initiated as a result of Christian interest in probing the ancient wisdom found in Jewish mystical sources, resulted in unprecedented mutual influence between Jewish and Christian Renaissance thought. The most original of Pico's 900 theses concerned the Kabbalah. As a result, he became the founder of the tradition known as Christian Kabbalah, which went on to be a central part of early modern Western esotericism. Pico's approach to different philosophies was one of extreme syncretism, placing them in parallel, it has been claimed, rather than attempting to describe a developmental history.

Pico based his ideas chiefly on Plato, as did his teacher, Marsilio Ficino, but retained a deep respect for Aristotle. Although he was a product of the studia humanitatis, Pico was constitutionally an eclectic, and in some respects he represented a reaction against the exaggerations of pure humanism, defending what he believed to be the best of the medieval and Islamic commentators, such as Averroes and Avicenna, on Aristotle in a famous long letter to Ermolao Barbaro in 1485. It was always Pico's aim to reconcile the schools of Plato and Aristotle since he believed they used different words to express the same concepts. It was perhaps for this reason his friends called him "Princeps Concordiae", or "Prince of Harmony" (a pun on Prince of Concordia, one of his family's holdings). Similarly, Pico believed that an educated person should also study Hebrew and Talmudic sources, and the Hermetics, because he thought they represented the same concept of God that is seen in the Old Testament, but in different words.

He finished his "Oration on the Dignity of Man" to accompany his 900 Theses and travelled to Rome to continue his plan to defend them. He had them published together in December 1486 as "Conclusiones philosophicae, cabalasticae et theologicae", and offered to pay the expenses of any scholars who came to Rome to debate them publicly. He wanted the debate to begin on 6 January, which was, as historian Steven Farmer has observed, the feast of Epiphany and "symbolic date of the submission of the pagan gentes to Christ in the persons of the Magi". After emerging victorious at the culmination of the debate, Pico planned not only on the symbolic acquiescence of the pagan sages, but also the conversion of Jews as they realised that Jesus was the true secret of their traditions. According to Farmer, Pico may have been expecting quite literally that "his Vatican debate would end with the Four Horsemen of the Apocalypse crashing through the Roman skies".

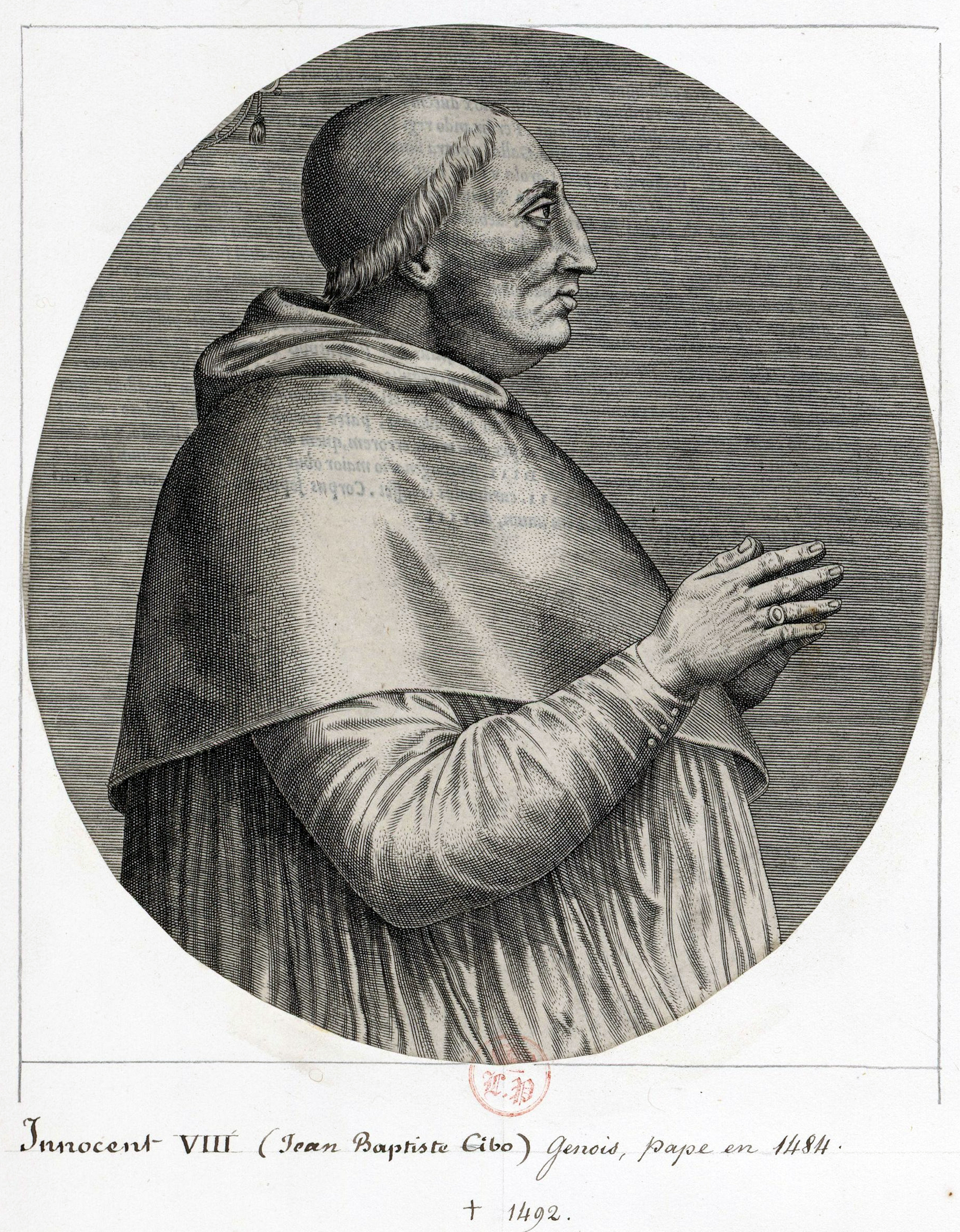
Innocent VIII, 15th century

In February 1487, Pope Innocent VIII halted the proposed debate, and established a commission to review the orthodoxy of the 900 Theses. Although Pico answered the charges against them, thirteen theses were condemned. Pico agreed in writing to retract them, but he did not change his mind about their validity. Eventually, all 900 theses were condemned. He proceeded to write an apologia defending them, Apologia J. Pici Mirandolani, Concordiae comitis, published in 1489, which he dedicated to his patron, Lorenzo. When the pope was apprised of the circulation of this manuscript, he set up an inquisitorial tribunal, forcing Pico to renounce the Apologia, in addition to his condemned theses, which he agreed to do. The pope censured 900 Theses as:

In part heretical, in part the flower of heresy; several are scandalous and offensive to pious ears; most do nothing but reproduce the errors of pagan philosophers [...] others are capable of inflaming the impertinence of the Jews; a number of them, finally, under the pretext of 'natural philosophy', favour arts [i.e., magic] that are enemies to the Catholic faith and to the human race.

This was the first time that a printed book had been banned by the Church, and nearly all copies were burned. Pico fled to France in 1488, where he was arrested by Philip II, Duke of Savoy, at the demand of the papal nuncios, and imprisoned at Vincennes. Through the intercession of several Italian princes – all instigated by Lorenzo de' Medici – King Charles VIII had him released, and the pope was persuaded to allow Pico to move to Florence and to live under Lorenzo's protection. But he was not cleared of the papal censures and restrictions until 1493, after the accession of Alexander VI (Rodrigo Borgia) to the papacy.

The experience deeply shook Pico. He reconciled with Savonarola, who remained a very close friend. It was at Pico's persuasion that Lorenzo invited Savonarola to Florence. But Pico never renounced his syncretist convictions. He settled in a villa near Fiesole prepared for him by Lorenzo, where he wrote and published the Heptaplus id est de Dei creatoris opere (1489) and De Ente et Uno (Of Being and Unity, 1491). It was here that he also wrote his other most celebrated work, the Disputationes adversus astrologiam divinicatrium (Treatise Against Predictive Astrology), which was not published until after his death. In it, Pico acidly condemned the deterministic practices of the astrologers of his day.

After the death of Lorenzo de' Medici, in 1492, Pico moved to Ferrara, although he continued to visit Florence. In Florence, political instability gave rise to the increasing influence of Savonarola, whose reactionary opposition to Renaissance expansion and style had already brought about conflict with the Medici family (they eventually were expelled from Florence) and would lead to the wholesale destruction of books and paintings. Nevertheless, Pico became a follower of Savonarola. Determined to become a monk, he dismissed his former interest in Egyptian and Chaldean texts, destroyed his own poetry and gave away his fortune.

=== Death ===
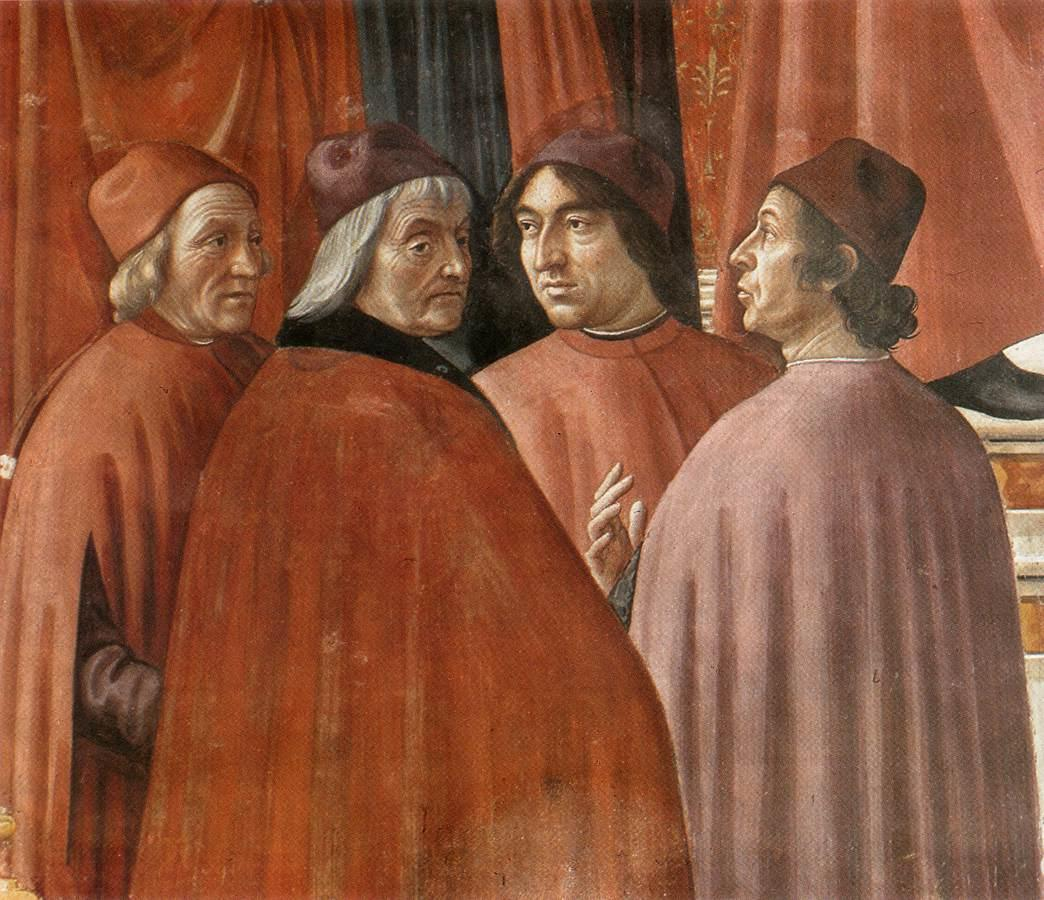
Angel Appearing to Zacharias (detail), by Domenico Ghirlandaio, c. 1486–90, showing (l–r) Marsilio Ficino, Cristoforo Landino, Poliziano and Demetrios Chalkondyles

In 1494, at the age of 31, Pico died under mysterious circumstances along with his friend Poliziano.

It was rumoured that his own secretary had poisoned him because Pico had become too close to Savonarola. He was interred together with Girolamo Benivieni at San Marco, and Savonarola delivered the funeral oration. Ficino wrote:

Our dear Pico left us on the same day that Charles VIII was entering Florence, and the tears of men of letters compensated for the joy of the people. Without the light brought by the king of France, Florence might perhaps have never seen a more somber day than that which extinguished Mirandola's light.

In 2007, the bodies of Poliziano and Pico were exhumed from the Church of San Marco in Florence to establish the causes of their deaths. Forensic tests showed that both Poliziano and Pico likely died of arsenic poisoning, possibly at the order of Lorenzo's successor, Piero de' Medici. Subsequent scientific investigation found that while Pico may have died from acute arsenic poisoning (intentional or otherwise), there was not enough evidence to conclude the same for Poliziano, and levels of arsenic found in his remains may have been from chronic exposure or have taken place post-mortem.

== Writings ==
In the Oratio de hominis dignitate (Oration on the Dignity of Man, 1486), Pico justified the importance of the human quest for knowledge, masterfully blending Neoplatonism and Aristotelian Scholasticism.

The Oration also served as an introduction to Pico's 900 theses, which he believed to provide a complete and sufficient basis for the discovery of all knowledge, and hence a model for mankind's ascent of the chain of being. The 900 Theses are a good example of humanist syncretism, because Pico combined Platonism, Neoplatonism, Aristotelianism, Hermeticism and Kabbalah. They also included 72 theses describing what Pico believed to be a complete system of physics.

Pico's De animae immortalitate (Paris, 1541), and other works, developed the doctrine that man's possession of an immortal soul freed him from the hierarchical stasis. Pico believed in universal reconciliation, as one of his 900 theses was "A mortal sin of finite duration is not deserving of eternal but only of temporal punishment;" it was among the theses pronounced heretical by Pope Innocent VIII in his bull of 4 August 1487.

In the Oration he argues, in the words of Pier Cesare Bori, that "human vocation is a mystical vocation that has to be realized following a three-stage way, which comprehends necessarily moral transformation, intellectual research and final perfection in the identity with the absolute reality. This paradigm is universal, because it can be retraced in every tradition."

A portion of his Disputationes adversus astrologiam divinatricem was published in Bologna after his death. In this book, Pico presents arguments against the practice of astrology that have had enormous resonance for centuries, up to our own time. Disputationes is influenced by the arguments against astrology espoused by one of his intellectual heroes, Augustine of Hippo, and also by the medieval philosophical tale Ḥayy ibn Yaqẓān by ibn Tufail, which promoted autodidacticism as a philosophical program.

Pico's antagonism to astrology seems to derive mainly from the conflict of astrology with Christian notions of free will. But Pico's arguments moved beyond the objections of Ficino, who was himself an astrologer. The manuscript was edited for publication after Pico's death by his nephew Giovanni Francesco Pico della Mirandola, an ardent follower of Savonarola, and may possibly have been amended to be more forcefully critical. This might possibly explain the fact that Ficino championed the manuscript and enthusiastically endorsed it before its publication.

Early in his career, Pico wrote a Commento sopra una canzone d'amore di Girolamo Benivieni, in which he revealed his plan to write a book entitled Poetica Theologia:

It was the opinion of the ancient theologians that divine subjects and the secret Mysteries must not be rashly divulged... the Egyptians had sculpted sphinxes in all their temples, for no other reason than to indicate that divine things, even when they are committed to writing, must be covered with enigmatic veils and poetic dissimulation... How that was done... by Latin and Greek poets we shall explain in the book of our Poetic Theology.

— Commento, Libro Terzo, Cap. xi, Stanza Nona

Pico's Heptaplus, a mystical-allegorical exposition of the creation according to the seven Biblical senses, elaborates on his idea that different religions and traditions describe the same God. The book is written in his characteristic apologetic and polemic style:

If they agree with us anywhere, we shall order the Hebrews to stand by the ancient traditions of their fathers; if anywhere they disagree, then drawn up in Catholic legions we shall make an attack upon them. In short, whatever we detect foreign to the truth of the Gospels we shall refute to the extent of our power, while whatever we find holy and true we shall bear off from the synagogue, as from a wrongful possessor, to ourselves, the legitimate Israelites.

— Heptaplus, Proem to 3rd exposition

On Being and the One (Latin: De ente et uno) has explanations of several passages in the Pentateuch, Plato and Aristotle. It is an attempted reconciliation between Platonic and Aristotelian writings on the relative places of being and "the one" and a refutation of opposing arguments.

He wrote in Italian an imitation of Plato's Symposium. His letters (Aureae ad familiares epistolae Paris, 1499) are important for the history of contemporary thought. The many editions of his entire works in the sixteenth century sufficiently prove his influence.

Another notorious text by Pico is De omnibus rebus et de quibusdam aliis ("Of all things that exist and a little more"), which is mentioned in some entries on Thomas More's Utopia and makes fun of the title of Lucretius' De rerum natura.

== Cultural references ==
- In Walter Pater's seminal book Studies in the History of the Renaissance (1873), an entire chapter is devoted to Pico della Mirandola.
- In James Joyce's Ulysses, the precocious Stephen Dedalus recalls with disdain his boyhood ambitions, and apparently associates them with the career of Mirandola: "Remember your epiphanies written on green oval leaves, deeply deep...copies to be sent if you died to all the great libraries of the world...Pico della Mirandola like."
- Of minor interest is a passing reference to Mirandola by H. P. Lovecraft, in the story The Case of Charles Dexter Ward (1927). Mirandola is given as the source of the fearsome incantation used by unknown evil entities as some sort of evocation. However, this "spell" was first depicted (as the key to a rather simple form of divination, not a great and terrible summoning) by, and in all likelihood created by, Heinrich Cornelius Agrippa von Nettesheim in his Three Books of Occult Philosophy. This was written several decades after Mirandola's death and was the first written example of that "spell", so it is almost impossible for Mirandola to have been the source of those "magic words".
- Psychoanalyst Otto Rank, a rebellious disciple of Sigmund Freud, chose a substantial excerpt from Mirandola's Oration on the Dignity of Man as the motto for his book Art and Artist: Creative Urge and Personality Development, including: "...I created thee as a being neither celestial nor earthly... so that thou shouldst be thy own free moulder and overcomer...".
- In Umberto Eco's novel Foucault's Pendulum the protagonist Casaubon claims that the idea that the Jews were privy to the enigma of the Templars was "a mistake of Pico Della Mirandola" caused by a spelling mistake he made between "Israelites" and "Ismaelites".
- In Irving Stone's novel about Michelangelo, The Agony and the Ecstasy, book 3, part 3 contains a paragraph's description of Mirandola as part of the scholarly circle that surrounded Lorenzo di Medici in Florence. Mirandola was described as a man who spoke 22 languages, was deeply read in philosophy, and someone who made no enemies.
- Philosopher of social science René Girard mentions Mirandola passingly in his book Des choses cachées depuis la fondation du monde (French for 'Things Hidden Since the Foundation of the World'), Girard writes in a disparaging tone, "People will accuse us of playing at being Pico della Mirandola – "the renaissance man – certainly a temptation to be resisted today, if we wish to be seen in a favourable light. (p. 141, 1987)
- In Roberto Bolaño's novel 2666, the philosophy professor Oscar Amalfitano begins his three-columned list of philosophers with Pico della Mirandola. Adjacent to Mirandola, Amalfitano writes Hobbes, while beneath him he writes Husserl (p. 207, 2008).
- In Frédéric Lenoir's novel L'Oracle della Luna (2006), the philosophy of Pico della Mirandola forms one of the major teachings acquired by the protagonist, Giovanni, from his main spiritual Master. The year is 1530. The major mentions are:
  - at the end of Chapter 21 the sage – a fictitious character – says he has personally met Pico della Mirandola and discusses Mirandola's disagreement with the pope about the 900 Theses (with Lenoir stating that only 7 of them had not been accepted) and the philosopher's later fate. In the words of the sage, the main goal of Ficino and Pico della Mirandola was to acquire universal knowledge, free from prejudice and from linguistic and religious barriers;
  - at the end of Chapter 24, having discussed Luther's concept of free will, the sage wants to acquaint Giovanni with Mirandola's ideas on this issue and lets him read "De hominis dignitate"; Giovanni peruses the book with great interest in Chapter 25;
  - at the beginning of Chapter 26, with Giovanni having now read the Oration on the Dignity of Man, the sage discusses two issues from the book with him. One is Pico della Mirandola's attempt to form one unified and universal philosophy and the difficulties thereof. The other one is Mirandola's concept of free will. Giovanni has learnt one passage from the book by heart, about God addressing man and telling him, that He has made him neither a heavenly nor an earthly creature and that man is the forger of his own fate. This passage is quoted in the novel.
- English composer Gavin Bryars made use of the texts of Pico della Mirandola in his musical production; most notably in pieces like "Glorious Hill", for vocal quartet/mixed choir, "Pico's Flight", for soprano and orchestra, and "Incipit Vita Nova" for alto and string trio.
- Pico della Mirandola appears as the character Ikaros in Jo Walton's novels The Just City and The Philosopher Kings. Also, he is one of the main characters in her novel Lent.
- In the book Dying for Ideas; The Dangerous Lives of the Philosophers (2015) by Romanian philosopher Costica Bradatan, Mirandola's life and work is taken as an early or even first example of taking human life as a project of 'self-fashioning', relating this to Mirandola's heretic idea of man being part of creation with 'an indefinite nature'.
- Pico della Mirandola is the protagonist in the short story by Jack Dann "The Glass Casket", which was published as a part of the Snow White, Blood Red anthology.
- In the graphic novel All-Star Superman by Grant Morrison Giovanni Pico della Mirandola can be seen reciting a part of the Oration on the Dignity of Man.

== See also ==
- Caterina Pico (sister)
- Christian Kabbalah
- Contemporary Italian Renaissance philosophers: Marsilio Ficino, Lodovico Lazzarelli, Giovanni Mercurio da Correggio
- Hermetica (philosophical writings attributed to Hermes Trismegistus)
- Hermeticism
- Perennial philosophy
- Platonic Academy (Florence)
- Renaissance humanism
- Renaissance magic

== Sources and further reading ==
- This article incorporates text from a publication now in the public domain: Herbermann, Charles, ed. (1913). "Giovanni Pico della Mirandola". Catholic Encyclopedia. New York: Robert Appleton Company.
- Ben-Zaken, Avner, "Defying Authority, Rejecting Predestination and Conquering Nature", in Reading Hayy Ibn-Yaqzan: A Cross-Cultural History of Autodidacticism (Johns Hopkins University Press, 2011), pp. 65–100. ISBN 978-0801897399.
- Borchardt, Frank L. "The Magus as Renaissance Man." Sixteenth Century Journal (1990): 57–76. doi:10.2307/2541132.
- Busi, G., "'Who does not wonder at this Chameleon?' The Kabbalistic Library of Giovanni Pico della Mirandola", in "Hebrew to Latin, Latin to Hebrew. The Mirroring of Two Cultures in the Age of Humanism. Colloquium held at the Warburg Institute. London, October 18–19, 2004", Edited by G. Busi, Berlin-Torino: Nino Aragno Editore, 2006: 167–196.
- Busi, G. with S. M. Bondoni and S. Campanini (eds.), The Great Parchment: Flavius Mithridates' Latin Translation, the Hebrew Text, and an English Version, The Kabbalistic Library of Giovanni Pico della Mirandola – 1. Torino: Nino Aragno Editore, 2004.
- Danielle Layne; David D. Butorac (2017). Proclus and his Legacy. De Gruyter. ISBN 978-3-11-047162-5.
- Campanini, S. The Book of Bahir. Flavius Mithridates' Latin Translation, the Hebrew Text, and an English Version, with a Foreword by G. Busi, The Kabbalistic Library of Giovanni Pico della Mirandola – 2. Torino: Nino Aragno Editore, 2005.
- Campanini, Saverio. "Talmud, Philosophy, Kabbalah: A Passage from Pico della Mirandola's Apologia and its Source." In The Words of a Wise Man's Mouth are Gracious. Festschrift for Günter Stemberger on the Occasion of His 65th Birthday, edited by M. Perani, 429–447. Berlin & New York: W. De Gruyter Verlag, 2005.
- Cassirer, Ernst, Paul Oskar Kristeller, and John Herman Randall, Jr. The Renaissance Philosophy of Man. Chicago: The University of Chicago Press, 1948.
- Chisholm, Hugh, ed. (1911). "Pico Della Mirandola, Giovanni" . Encyclopædia Britannica. Vol. 21 (11th ed.). Cambridge University Press. pp. 584–585.
- Coenhaver, Brian P. (2020). Magic and the Dignity of Man: Pico della Mirandola and His Oration in Modern Memory. Belknap Press, Harvard.
- Corazzol, Giacomo (ed.), Menahem Recanati, Commentary on the Daily Prayers. The Kabbalistic Library of Giovanni Pico della Mirandola – 3. 2 volumes. Torino: Nino Aragno Editore, 2008.
- Dougherty, M. V., ed. Pico della Mirandola. New Essays. Cambridge: Cambridge University Press, 2008.
- Dulles, Avery, Princeps Concordiae: Pico della Mirandola and the Scholastic Tradition – The Harvard Phi Beta Kappa Prize Essay for 1940, Cambridge, MA, 1941.
- Farmer, S. A. Syncretism in the West: Pico's 900 Theses (1486): The Evolution of Traditional Religious and Philosophical Systems. Temple, AZ: Medieval & Renaissance Texts & Studies, 1998. (Contains the Latin text of the 900 theses, an English translation, and detailed commentary.)
- Gilbhard, Thomas. "Paralipomena pichiana: a propos einer Pico–Bibliographie". In Accademia. Revue de la Société Marsile Ficin VII (2005): 81–94.
- Hanegraaff, Wouter (2012). Esotericism and the Academy: Rejected Knowledge in Western Culture. Cambridge: Cambridge University Press. ISBN 978-0521196215.
- Giovanni Pico della Mirandola, "Apologia. L'autodifesa di Pico di fronte al Tribunale dell'Inquisizione", a cura di Paolo Edoardo Fornaciari, Firenze, Sismel – Edizioni del Galluzzo, 2010 (it:Società internazionale per lo studio del Medioevo latino)
- Heiser, James D., Prisci Theologi and the Hermetic Reformation in the Fifteenth Century, Malone, TX: Repristination Press, 2011. ISBN 978-1-4610-9382-4.
- Jurgan, Susanne, Campanini, Saverio, The Gate of Heaven. Flavius Mithridates' Latin Translation, the Hebrew Text, and an English Version. Edited with Introduction and Notes by S. Jurgan and S. Campanini with a Text on Pico by Giulio Busi, in The Kabbalistic Library of Giovanni Pico della Mirandola 5, Nino Aragno Editore, Torino 2012. ISBN 978-8884195449
- Kristeller, Paul Oskar. Eight Philosophers of the Italian Renaissance. Stanford, CA: Stanford University Press, 1964.
- Martigli, Carlo A., "999 L'Ultimo Custode", Italia: Castelvecchi, 2009.
- Pater, Walter. "Pico Della Mirandola." In The Renaissance: Studies in Art and Poetry, 24–40. New York: The Modern Library, 1871.
- Quaquarelli, Leonardo, and Zita Zanardi. Pichiana. Bibliografia delle edizioni e degli studi. Firenze: Olschki, 2005 (Studi pichiani 10).
- Robb, Nesca A., Neoplatonism of the Italian Renaissance, New York: Octagon Books, Inc., 1968.
- Wilson-Lee, E., The Grammar of Angels: A Search for the Magical Powers of Language in Renaissance Italy London: William Collins, 2025.
