= M. H. Landauer =

M. H. Landauer (1808 – February 3, 1841) was a writer on Jewish mysticism, born in Kappel, near Buchau, Württemberg, in Germany. He was a son of the cantor Elias Landauer, and at the age of 18 entered the yeshiva and lyceum in Karlsruhe; later, he studied at the Ludwig-Maximilians-Universität München and the University of Tübingen. In spite of ill health, he returned to Munich in 1838 to copy from Hebrew manuscripts in the Royal Library extracts for use in his investigations. In 1839, he passed the examination for the rabbinate, and in the following year was appointed rabbi of Braunsbach, Württemberg. Only three months later, illness obliged him to resign his position and to return to Kappel, where he died.

Of Landauer's works, the following may be mentioned:

- Jehova und Elohim, oder die Althebräische Gotteslehre als Grundlage der Geschichte der Symbolik und der Gesetzgebung der Bücher Mosis, Stuttgart and Augsburg, 1836 (see A. Geiger's review in his Wiss. Zeit. Jüd. Theol. iii. 403 et seq.)
- Wesen und Form des Pentateuchs, ib. 1838.

Landauer's posthumous works and excerpts, dealing with his investigations of the history and literature of the Kabala, of the Zohar, and of Jewish literature, as well as his report on his studies of Hebrew manuscripts, were published in Orient, Lit. 1845–46.

== Jewish Encyclopedia bibliography ==
- Jost's Annalen, iii. 69 et seq.;
- Julius Fürst, Bibl. Jud. ii. 219 et Seq
