= Giovanni di Bardo Corsi =

Florentian politician and gonfaloniere

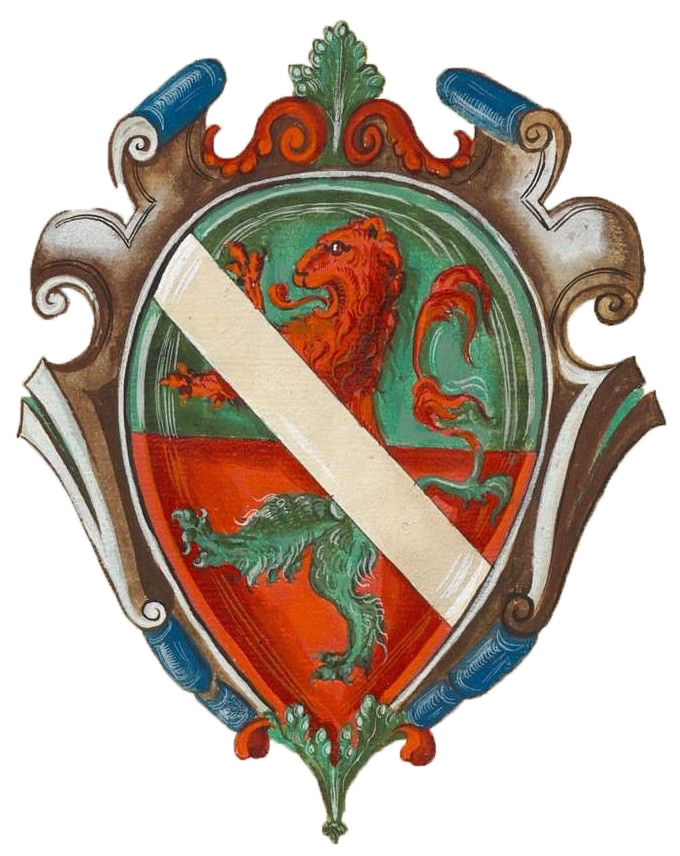
- Born: 2 June 1472; Florence, Italy
- Died: 17 July 1547 (aged 75); Florence, Italy
- House: Corsi
- Father: Bardo di Bartolo Corsi
- Mother: Francesca Tedaldi
- Occupation: Politician, man of letters, gonfaloniere, ambassador, teacher

Giovanni di Bardo Corsi (2 June 1472 – 17 July 1547) was an Italian politician and man-of-letters in Florence during the Italian Renaissance. He was a member of the committee that in 1512 restored the Medici to power in Florence after eighteen years of exile. He served as a diplomat to Charles V of Spain in 1515 and to Pope Paul III. In 1530, Corsi became Florentine gonfaloniere at the behest of Pope Clement VII, the Medici Pope.

Giovanni di Bardo Corsi was also a Renaissance humanist who actively participated in the rediscovery of classical language and literatures and the educational programme of the studia humanitatis. He knew both Latin and Greek. In 1506, Corsi produced a biography of the neo-Platonist Marsilio Ficino, which he wrote under the direction of Francesco Cattani da Diacceto, who, in turn, was Ficino's successor as the head of Florentine Platonic Academy. He was a participant in the early phase of the Orti Oricellari discussions and produced a translation of Plutarch's de anima generatione. He is furthermore believed to have been an early reader of Guicciardini's monumental Storia d'Italia.

== Life ==
Giovanni was born in Florence in 1472 from Bardo (of the Domenico branch) and Francesca Tedaldi.

He appeared to be "confident and very affectionate to the Medici house, against the natural disposition of his father Bardo and his ancestors" which led to problems with his family, years later, even influencing the execution of two family members.

If Giovanni's fame appears above all linked to having occupied important public offices after the return of the Medici to Florence in 1512, it is also true that the first manifestations of its political tendencies begin to reveal themselves since the early 16th century. During the period he came into contact with the environment of the Orti Oricellari. The friends he frequented around that time, such as Francesco Vettori, Pietro Martelli, Pietro Crinito, and Francesco Cattani da Diacceto, all belonged to the humanist circle holding an aristocratic opposition to the popular government of Soderini. In the subsequent period of the Orti Oricellari's flourishing between 1513 and 1522, when they became the center of the republican opposition, Giovanni would gradually move away, remaining consistent with its aristocratic ideals of restricted government. In the Orti Oricellari environment, and above all through the teaching of Francesco Cattani da Diacceto, Giovanni came into contact with the philosophy of Ficino. A testimony of the bonds of friendship that bound him to Diacceto is the dedication that he made to Giovanni of a panegyric on love. The proof of Giovanni's admiration for Ficino's thought is constituted by the 1506 writing of Marsili Ficini vita, the first biography of the philosopher.

Giovanni, who had not personally known the philosopher, reworked the testimonies drawn from the humanistic environment he frequented. Dedicated to Bindaccio Ricasoli, it was composed above all "to please Ricasoli and to exalt the house of the Medici and his own friends of Soderini's Florence and the flourishing Republic dominated by the Medici", what appears clearly and testifies to a political choice to which Giovanni would have remained consistent even later: "in nostra civitate, pro disciplinis ac bonis artibus inscientia et ignorantia, pro liberalitate avaritia, pro modestia et continentia ambitio et luxuria dominantur".

Further confirmation of Giovanni's humanistic background is represented by his preface of 1508 to the Florentine edition of De prudentia del Pontano.

Giovanni had personally met Pontano during a trip to Naples between 1501 and 1503 and from him he had obtained a copy of the De prudentia, perhaps to spread its content in the circle of Florentine writers. The volume, which appeared in August 1508, was dedicated by Giovanni to the archbishop of Florence Cosimo de' Pazzi.

Giovanni also appears in the still-unpublished Latin translations of four minor operettas by Plutarch. Composed between 1511 and 1513, they were dedicated to friends of the humanistic circle (Palla Rucellai, Vincenzo Querini, Francesco Vettori, Francesco da Diacceto) and represent one of the last direct contributions of Giovanni to that "Latin culture of Humanism, rhetorical part and the philosophical part as it was propagated by Ficino and his school". By that time, after the return of the Medici in 1512, with the numerous public offices held, Giovanni's humanistic commitment would have represented a marginal aspect of his activity.

After 1512, in the period in which the Medici re-founded their own system of government on new foundations by appealing to the major exponents of the Florentine aristocracy to liquidate the most strident aspects of the popular period, even an opponent of Soderini such as Giovanni could constitute a useful element of support to the new political reality. The position of officer of Honesty, which he had occupied in 1498, that is, in the period following the expulsion of the Medici, certainly did not constitute a stain in the political past of Giovanni, who had always remained fiercely in opposition during the years of Soderini. Precisely in 1512 he was elected a member of the nurse, the body that concentrated the legislative power and a large part of the executive, and in which the major aristocratic families were represented. After a post as ambassador to Venice, again in 1512, he was sent, between 1513 and 1515, as a Florentine representative at the Spanish court.

The Medici government, in this, as in other cases, by entrusting Giovanni with a diplomatic post, knew how to put to good use the oratorical skills of a man of letters who by his contemporaries was often "heard to argue ornately in the public railings, about the integrity of life, of justice, of the Republic, of liberty, and of those praiseworthy offices which are owed to the charity of the fatherland". The task of the observer at the court of Ferdinand the Catholic proved to be particularly difficult for Giovanni, as Lorenzo de' Medici wrote on 23 March 1514, since "this Majesty is so cautious and secret about his negotiation that it is not only difficult, but it is quite impossible to be able to investigate any of his conception". The letter continued: "And VM has come to know that in this court there are great barons, very old-fashioned servants of this Majesty, and with no one he trusts or ever communicates his design... So that it is necessary, not wanting to err here, to write only the effects and when they came to light".

On his return journey from the Spanish court, Giovanni passed through France, and through his friend Francesco Vettori, he was introduced to King Francis I.

In the following years, political posts in Florence and abroad alternate with diplomatic missions. Between 1517 and 1522 he occupied the posts of captain in Pistoia (1517), was elected among the Conservatores legum (1518), was consul of the Sea in Pisa (1518), was among the Boni viri stincarum (1520), and among the eight guard (1520). After being sent as ambassador to Siena in 1521, he was finally able to access in January 1522 the most prestigious office of the Republic, that of Gonfaloniere of Justice.

Again in Spain he was sent together with Francesco Girolami in 1522 to address the congratulations of the Florentine government to Charles V for his election as emperor, which took place in 1519. After a diplomatic mission to Venice in 1524, Giovanni the same year had the task of accompanying the two illegitimate offspring of the Medici family, Ippolito, son of Giuliano, and Alessandro, son of Lorenzo, to Florence.

This position testifies to the degree of trust reached by Giovanni in the Medici family and in particular with Giulio de' Medici, who, elected pope in 1523 and forced to abandon the Florentine government, transferred the effective management of business to the hands of Cardinal Silvio Passerini. and he sent Ippolito and Alessandro to Florence as official representatives of family continuity. Giovanni became a kind of tutor for the two young men. Busini, in this regard, known as Giovanni "with great care he sought, being alone and rich and learned, the government of the two children, having taken that gain from Rosso Ridolfi, who was full of children and without letters". Evidently not so much the desire for money as rather the social prestige had been the reason for the "great care" with which C. had tried to get the job of guiding the two Medici.

In 1525, after the battle of Pavia, Giovanni was again sent to the Spanish court.

This diplomatic mission, when Charles V extended his influence in Italy despite the opposition of Clement VII and defeating the French army in Pavia, immediately appeared more complex than the others carried out by Giovanni in Spain. In a letter dated March 27, he set out the difficulties encountered: "Truly, after the capitulation made by His Holiness with the King Christianissimo, I had a very bad time negotiating in this court; and although I delayed and justified with giving those reasons that I they seemed to be the best in excusation of our Lord and ours, nevertheless it did not help". The implications present in the speeches of Charles V could not fail to worry Corsi. As when, for example, the emperor, referring to the victory of Pavia, tacitly criticized the attitude of the former allies, arguing that "although this happiness might have seemed to him all the greater, as in it he had not had in the company of any of his friends, nevertheless he wanted it to be common to all". Giovanni, on his return from Spain, could report to the Florentine government and above all to the pope the severe warning that the emperor had addressed to him: "Ambassador, you will tell His Holiness on our part that for any great thing that His Holiness against me I will always be obedient son to the apostolic chair. But when His Holiness does something that is pernicious to Christianity tell him that he will not have my greatest enemy in the world".

Elected of the Signori in January 1527, he was in Pisa, when, in May of the same year, the Medici were expelled from Florence.

In a letter of 18 May, addressed to Vettori, Giovanni expressed his fears about the new form of government, however also demonstrating his perplexities as a statesman by now disillusioned and unable to fully subscribe to the "system" of the Medici, perhaps always further from his expectations: "We mean the new form of government of which I have nothing else to say except that I will indicate every government to be good, which will not only be approved universally, but which still happens such that I remedied the imminent ruin of the sack... By electione I got up a curis reipublice and since I have no strength I would not want to go back there". those who in the Medici period had held important positions. Forced to abandon the Florentine territory, he took refuge in Lucca with Cardinal Passerini. In the Republic of Lucca he worked to prevent the fortresses of Pisa from being handed over to the Florentines. Later, with other exponents of the Medici party, he settled in Rome at the court of Clement VII. In 1529, together with twenty-eight other citizens "from the first houses of Florence", who "had not returned between the terms assigned to them", he was declared a rebel.

Only in the year 1530, with the fall of the Republic, Giovanni was able to return to Florence following the Medici and hold positions appropriate to his past political prestige. In 1530 he was elected Gonfalonier of Justice for the second time. Precisely in this period the Giovanni caused the exile of Silvestro Aldobrandini, exponent of the opposition to the Medici, who was confined for three years in Faenza.

In 1531 he was one of the twenty-four couplers, chosen to squeak those eligible for the various magistrates. In 1532 he was finally elected senator for the district of Santa Croce. The last diplomatic assignment was entrusted to him in 1534, when he participated in the legation sent to render obedience to the new Pope Paul III, in front of whom he delivered a solemn speech.

Linked by friendship to Francesco Guicciardini, he had the privilege of knowing in these years, among the first, the history of Italy as it was composed by the author. The judgment according to which the few corrections made to the friend's manuscript can be considered "the greatest title of the literary fame of Corsi", as was claimed by Roberto Ridolfi, appears doubtful and ends up diminishing all the activity of a man of culture carried out by Giovanni in the first decade of the 16th century. In reality, the advice, the judgments, the suggestions that Giovanni was noting down while reading the History of Guicciardini have a limited value both due to the scarce account in which Guicciardini himself kept them, and because they represent marginal notations of style rather than really new contributions, useful for the elaboration of the friend. They are of greater interest in the reconstruction of the biographical events of Giovanni as they allow to highlight his humanistic commitment, which could appear limited to the period of his youth, and which on the contrary constitutes a constant aspect in his entire activity. The critical remarks on his friend's manuscript appear entirely formal. Such is, for example, the reproach for the "familiarity and Florentine nature of elocution", and such is also the advice regarding the subdivision into books of History: "I would have wished that at least I would finish in XX books and not in XIX as a more perfect number". Giovanni expressed some general suggestions at the end of the reading, recognizing Guicciardini as the greatest historian: "Omnes procul dubio quotquot historiam scripserunt longe superas".

After the assassination of Alessandro de' Medici, Giovanni began to withdraw more and more from political life. Naturally, his rather advanced age contributed to this. However, Giovanni's difficulty in recognizing himself in a political reality increasingly distant from his aristocratic government projects, which had taken shape in the period of the first flowering of the Orti Oricellari, during which he had perhaps caressed the political model of Venice, was not extraneous aristocratic. Perhaps because of his distant youth formation and certainly because of his social position as an aristocrat, Giovanni was opposed to the election of Cosimo I, after the death of Alessandro. Very soon however, in 1537, together with other friends, such as Francesco Vettori, Francesco Guicciardini, Matteo Niccolini, Roberto Acciaiuoli, Matteo Strozzi, he became part of the private council with which Cosimo I consulted in order to "negotiate more closely and with greater comfort".

He died in Florence on 17 July 1547.
