= Vincenzo Querini =

Venetian patrician, diplomat and church reformer

Vincenzo Querini (Note: Also spelled Quirini—or Quirinus in Latin.) (1478/79 – 23 September 1514) was a Venetian patrician, diplomat and church reformer.

An accomplished Renaissance humanist, he held a doctorate in philosophy and wrote poetry in Tuscan. He served as ambassador to Castile (1504–1506) and the Holy Roman Empire (1506–1507). In 1512, he became a Camaldolese monk and took the religious name Pietro. (Note: Or Piero.) As a monk, he worked closely with his friend Tommaso Giustiniani for the reform of the order. They also addressed a tract to Pope Leo X arguing for a comprehensive reform of the church. His early death preempted Leo's plan to appoint him a cardinal.

== Life ==
=== Secular ===
Querini was born in 1478 or 1479 to Girolamo di Blandino Querini and his wife Dandola, daughter of Antonio Dandolo. His brothers were Francesco, Marcantonio and Zorzi. They lived in San Polo. After the death of their father, they were raised by their uncle, Antonio Querini.

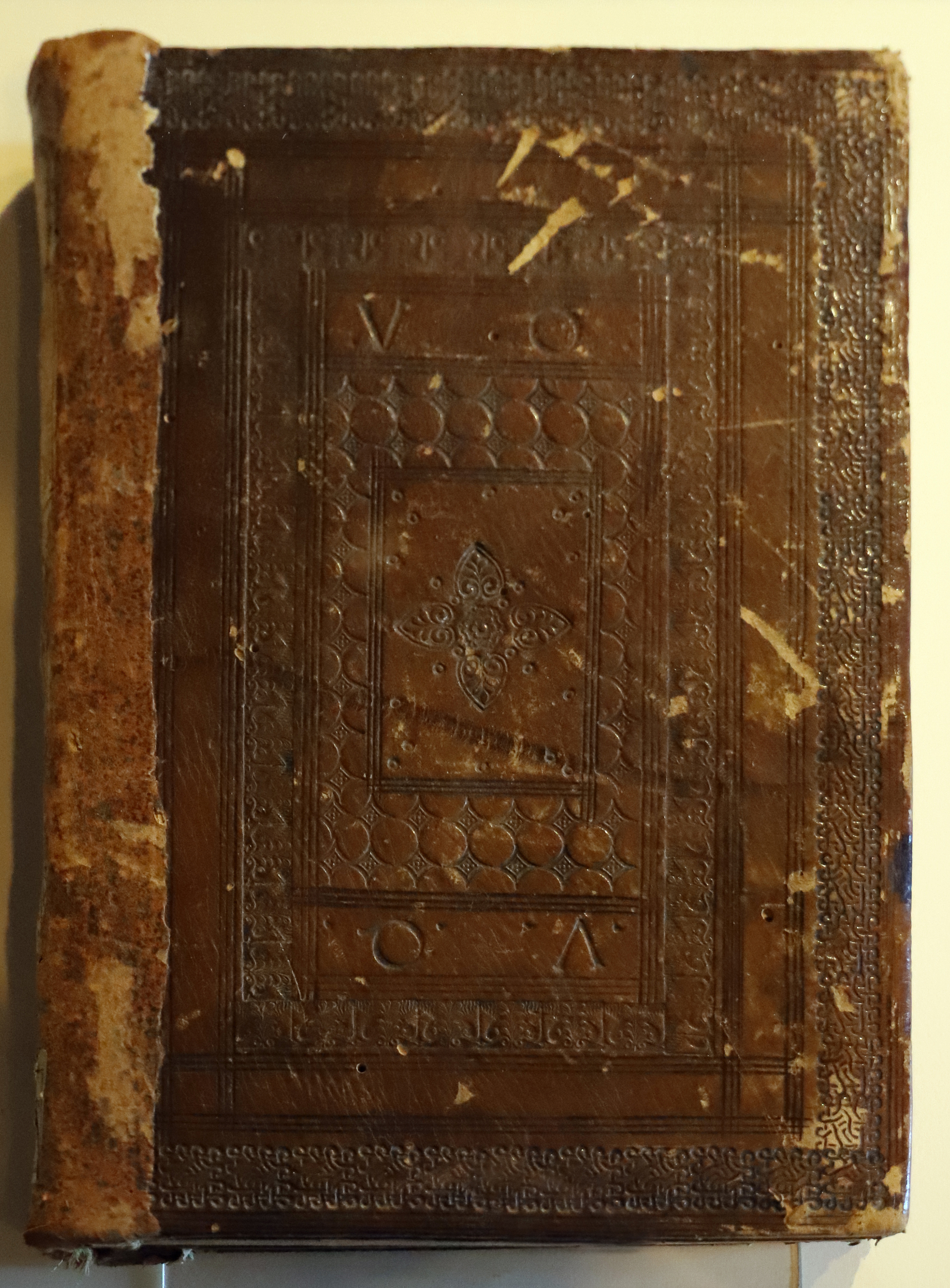
A copy once owned by Querini of the 1496 edition of the Greek poet Theocritus printed by Aldo Manuzio

In 1492, Querini began to study philosophy at the University of Padua. Among his teachers was Agostino Nifo and his friends included Pietro Bembo, Gasparo Contarini and Tommaso Giustiniani. He studied Averroes and became adept at Greek. In 1501, Querini and Giustiniani took a vow of chastity to devote themselves to the study of the Bible. In 1502, Querini went to Rome with Bembo to defend his thesis containing 4,059 (Note: Or 4,500.) philosophical and theological propositions before Pope Alexander VI and the College of Cardinals. The pope awarded him a doctorate.

On 16 December 1504, Querini was elected ambassador of the Republic of Venice to the court of Philip the Fair, Duke of Burgundy, the husband of Queen Joanna of Castile. He arrived at Saarbrücken in March 1505, was shipwrecked off the English coast in January 1506, was stranded for two months in Falmouth and arrived in Castile in April. He returned to Venice by October following Philip's death. In Castile, he met Pietro Martire d'Anghiera.

On 23 October 1506, Querini was elected ambassador to the emperor-elect, Maximilian I of Germany. He arrived in Strasbourg in March 1507. In accordance with his instructions, he refused Maximilian's request that his army be permitted to pass through Venetian territory in support of Pope Julius II against France. In October, he returned to Venice.

=== Religious ===
In 1508, around the start of the War of the League of Cambrai, Querini and Giustiniani made a joint decision to dedicate one hour each day to meditation. They began frequenting the Camaldolese monastery of San Michele in Isola. With Egnazio, they attempted to join the monastery of Praglia. Failing this, on 10 May 1510, they made a joint declaration of their intention to enter the Hermitage of Camaldoli as lay brothers. In 1510, Giustiniani broke the agreement by entering Camaldoli as a full monk.

In November 1511, (Note: Or September 1511.) Querini joined Giustiniani in Camaldoli. He spent January 1512 in Florence recovering from illness, where he was visited by leading local humanists, like Cosimo de' Pazzi, Giovanni di Bardo Corsi and Francesco Cattani da Diacceto. On 22 February 1512, he professed as a monk. He took the religious name Pietro.

At Camaldoli, Querini and Giustiniani successfully opposed the policies of the minister general Pietro Delfino and Basilio Nardi. In this they were supported by Elisabetta Gonzaga, Giuliano de' Medici and Giovanni de' Medici (soon to be elected Pope Leo X). In April 1513, a council of the order decided in their favour to remove Camaldoli from Delfino's control. Querini and Giustiniani visited Rome to have Leo personally affirm this decision in a bull. The following year the Fifth Lateran Council restored some powers to Delfino and Querini and Giustiniani took the case to arbitration in Rome, where Cardinals Antonio del Monte and Lorenzo Pucci found substantially in their favour in June 1514.

In April 1514, Leo X, seeking a rapprochement with Venice, considered elevating Querini to the cardinalate and using him in negotiations. This proposal had the support of Venice, but it alienated Querini from Bembo, with whom he was staying in Rome. He fell ill in August and died in Rome on 23 September 1514. Giustiniani considered it possible that he was poisoned, but it is more likely he had tuberculosis.

== Works ==
First page of Querini's published thesis

Querini's thesis was published, probably in 1503, as Conclusiones Vincentii Quirini patritii Veneti Romae disputatae.

At the urging of Giustiniani, Querini studied Hebrew and, with the help of an anonymous Venetian Jew, translated the biblical books of Job, Song of Songs and Psalms from the original language into Latin. He also wrote a Hebrew grammar, Grammaticae introductionis Hebraeorum libri tres, which was never published.

Querini's most important work was co-written with Giustiniani. The Libellus ad Leonem X is a treatise on church reform addressed to Leo X, to whom they personally delivered a copy in July 1513. It argues comprehensive reforms to root out clerical abuses, restore discipline to religious orders, revamp canon law, standardize the liturgy and pursue unity with separated churches in eastern Europe, Asia and Africa. Although papal supremacy was affirmed, the Libellus urged Leo to put off worldliness. As regards those outside the church, Jews should be converted or expelled and a crusade against Muslims pursued. Every priest should be able to read Latin, but the Bible should be translated into the vernacular for the laity. Querini's contribution to the treatise is most evident in its appeal for evangelizing the natives of the New World, about which he had learned during his embassy in Spain.

In addition to the aforementioned works in Latin, Querini wrote sonnets in archaic Tuscan in the style of Petrarch. The Venetian printer Gabriele Giolito de' Ferrari included his work in three of his published volumes: Rime diverse di molti eccellentissimi auttori nuovamente raccolti: Libro primo (1545); Rime di diversi nobili huomini et eccellenti poeti nella lingua toscana: Libro secondo (1547); and Rime di diversi eccellenti autori raccolte dai libri da noi altre volte impressi (1553), a collection put together by Lodovico Dolce. A volume dedicated to his poetry was published at Venice in 1548, Stanze de M. Vincentio Quirino belissime d'amore con alcuni sonetti mirabili sopra varii suggieti d'amore nuovamente venuti in luce. Paolo Manuzio also included some of his work in Lettere volgari di diversi nobilissimi huomini et eccellentissimi ingegni, scritte in diverse materie (1551).

Many of Querini's relazioni and dispatches as a diplomat have been published.
