= Platonic theology =

Platonic theology can refer to:

- The theological theories of the Greek philosopher Plato
- The work Theologia Platonica by the ancient philosopher Proclus
- The work Platonic Theology (Ficino) (Latin: Theologia Platonica; subtitle: de immortalitate animae) by the Renaissance philosopher Marsilio Ficino
