= Egnazio =

Venetian priest and humanist (1478–1553)

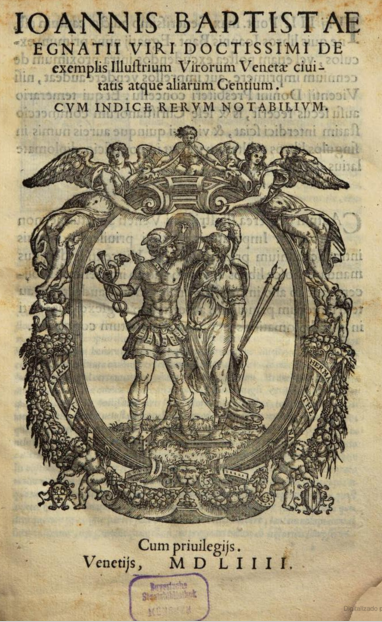
Title page of De exemplis illustrium virorum Venetae civitatis atque aliarum gentium (1554)

Giovanni Battista Cipelli (1478–1553), better known as Egnazio, (Note: His nickname (Latin Egnatius) may be preceded by his given names Giovanni Battista, but most often just by Battista (also spelled Batista). His first name may be spelled Zuan in Venetian fashion. His given names may be combined as Giambattista. His family name may be given as de' Cipelli. For these variants, see Ross 1976, Giraldi 2011 and Lowry 1976.) was a Venetian priest and humanist. He came to public notice through his rivalry with Marcantonio Sabellico in 1500–1506. From about 1508 until 1520 he was involved in the teaching and publishing endeavours of Aldo Manuzio and his successors. From 1520 until 1549, he held a public professorship in Venice. Upon his retirement, he was granted a full pension.

Egnazio's published writings include two books, three poems, four orations and some letters. His work as an editor is more notable, especially his work with Desiderius Erasmus and on the work of Suetonius. Seventeen publications bear his name as editor, sixteen in Latin and one in Greek.

== Life ==
=== Education ===
Although born into a poor family in Venice in 1478, Egnazio had learned to read by the age of four. He studied Greek, Latin, grammar and rhetoric at the chancery school of San Marco under Benedetto Brugnoli, followed by philosophy and logic at the school of the Rialto under Francesco Bragadin. At Brugnoli's suggestion, he began teaching grammar out of his home when he was seventeen years old. In 1501, he delivered an oration at the funeral of the Spanish ambassador, Lorenzo Suárez de la Vega. By 1502, he had joined the priesthood.

=== Rivalry with Sabellico ===
Egnazio came to public notice through his rivalry with the much older scholar Marcantonio Sabellico. This rivalry is noted by both Egnazio's biographer, Giovanni degli Agostini, (Note: Ross 1976, p. 536, n59, claims that "no comprehensive study of Egnazio has appeared since that of Giovanni degli Agostini" in 1745. Pierre Bayle included an entry on Egnazio in his Dictionnaire Historique et Critique (1740), cited in Ilić 2014, p. 259.) and Sabellico's, Apostolo Zeno. In 1500, Sabellico was promoted to the chair of humanities at San Marco to replace the late Giorgio Valla. Egnazio hoped to be appointed to Sabellico's vacant lectureship, but was passed over in favour of Giovanni Battista Scita. In 1502, he sought to succeed Brugnoli, whose lectureship remained vacant until 1504, when Niccolò Leonico received the appointment. Egnazio opened a private school near San Marco.

In 1502, Egnazio edited a new edition of Valerius Maximus' Dicta et facta for Aldo Manuzio, a text first edited for publication by Sabellico. That same year, he wrote critical comments about some of Sabellico's interpretations of the classics in a miscellany published by Giovanni Bembo. In 1506, the scholars reconciled. On his deathbed, Sabellico asked Egnazio to edit his unfinished work De exemplis for publication. Egnazio delivered his funeral oration and published De exemplis in 1507. By 1508–1509, Egnazio was noted among the learned of Venice by Luca Pacioli and Marino Sanudo.

=== Aldine fellow ===
From about 1508 to 1520, Egnazio held an office (officina) in the Aldine Academy as head of one of its four divisions. As early as 1506, he had been listed as an executor in Aldo Manuzio's will. In 1508, with Janus Lascaris, Marco Musuro and Girolamo Aleandro, he helped prepare Erasmus' Adagia for publication in Venice.

In 1510, Egnazio delivered the funeral oration for the mercenary captain Niccolò di Pitigliano on behalf of the republic. In 1511, he was granted full citizenship by the procurators de ultra and appointment as their notary. He was transferred from the collegiate church of Santa Marina to the canonry of San Basio and appointed prior of the hospital of San Marco by Doge Leonardo Loredan. Between 1511 and 1513, he suffered from a series of illnesses. In 1513, Aldo published a collection of Greek orations dedicated to Egnazio. In 1515, after Aldo's death, Egnazio readied his last work, an edition of Lactantius' Divine Institutes, for publication and wrote a dedication to Aldo.

During this period (1508–1515), Egnazio was part of a circle of young Venetians around Tommaso Giustiniani that were "undergoing in various degrees of intensity a crisis of conscience." Highly intellectual and attracted to the ascetic life, this group desired to join a monastic community without taking the full vows. Although Pietro Delfino, the superior general of the Order of Camaldoli, agreed to their request in 1510, two of the men—Giustiniani and Vincenzo Querini—opted to take full vows, while the others—Egnazio, Gasparo Contarini and Nicolò Tiepolo—abandoned the plan entirely. Nevertheless, Giustiniani and Querini continued for several years to press Egnazio to join them.

In 1514, Egnazio served as procurator of the provincial synod convoked by Patriarch Antonio Contarini. In 1515, he was granted the parish of Zelarino in benefice. He appointed a parish priest and visited the parish on his holidays. In 1515–1516, he was a member of the embassy sent to Francis I of France in Milan. For a panegyric he wrote to Francis, the king presented him with a gold portrait medallion.

=== Professor at San Marco ===
After the death of Musuro in 1518, Egnazio applied for the chair in Greek at San Marco. He withdrew his candidacy when it became clear that Vettore Fausto was the superior lecturer. When the chair in Latin was vacated by the death of Raffaele Regio in 1520, the students requested Egnazio to succeed him. This was opposed by Marino Becichemo, who insisted on a debate Egnazio for the position. Although Egnazio's supporters—his former teacher, Bragadin, and former student, Bernardo Cappello—insisted on the traditional lectures. Doge Loredan agreed to both and in the end Egnazio was elected.

The Latin chair initially paid 150 ducats, but in 1524 the salary was raised to 200 ducats with the addition of an afternoon lecture. In 1536–1538, he taught Matthias Flacius Illyricus, the future Lutheran controversialist. By the early 1540s, Egnazio was suffering from a facial deformity, but was denied permission to retire. In early 1548, Pier Paolo Vergerio stayed in his house for a time and gave public readings of his works. Vergerio had been exonerated of Lutheranism in 1546, but Egnazio ordered him to leave when he realized he was not a "good Catholic". Egnazio finally retired in 1549. At the urging of Bernardo Navagero, the Venetian Senate agreed to continue paying his salary in retirement, while the Council of Ten exempted him from taxation.

Egnazio died in Venice on 27 June 1553. He was buried in Santa Marina. His eulogy was delivered by Pietro Brichi. By his will, dated 23 October 1546, he left a globe to Nicolò Tiepolop; his collection of Greek books from the Aldine press to the monastery of San Gregorio and his medallions and other artefacts to the Bragadini, Loredani and Molini. His books were ultimately sold to Ulrich Fugger III and entered the Bibliotheca Palatina.

== Works ==
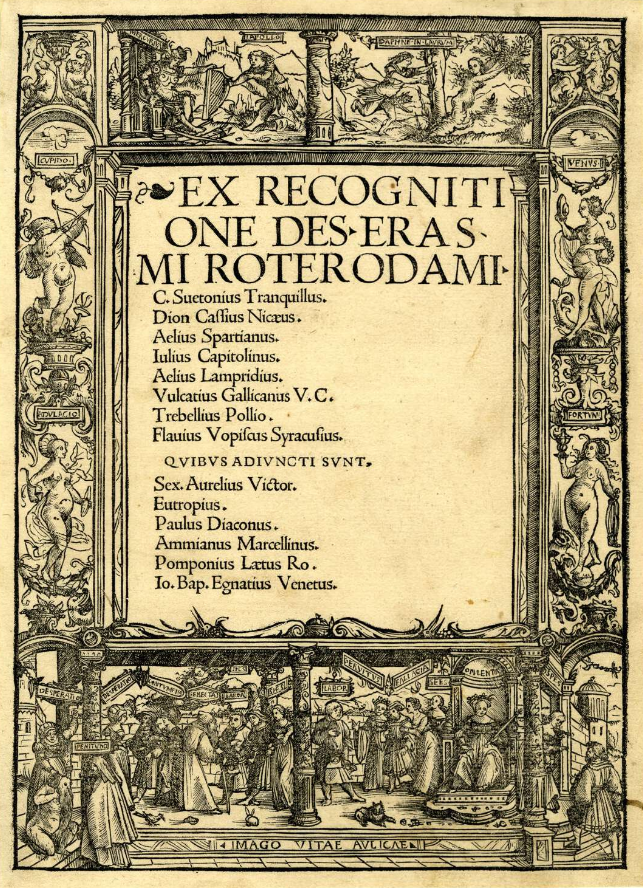
Titlepage of Erasmus' 1518 edition of Suetonius, which includes Egnazio's apparatus. Egnazio's name is at the bottom.

=== Editions ===
Egnazio edited the following Latin works for publication, all printed under his name at Venice except where noted:

- Valerius Maximus, Dicta et facta memorabilia (1502)
- works of Virgil with the commentaries of Servius and Probus (1507)
- Pliny the Younger, Epistulae (1508)
- Cicero, Epistolae ad familiares (1509, reprinted at Milan in 1519 and Paris in 1545)
- Juvenal, Satires, with the commentaries of Giovanni Britannico, Angelo Poliziano and Filippo Beroaldo (Milan, 1514)
- Lactantius, Divine Institutes (1515)
- Tertullian, Apologeticus contra gentes (1515)
- Aulus Gellius, Attic Nights, with Latin glosses of Greek words (1515)
- Ovid, Heroides (1515, reprinted at Lyon in 1527, Leiden in 1529 and Cologne in 1543)
- a volume containing Suetonius, De vita Caesarum; excerpts from Aurelius Victor; Eutropius, De gestis Romanorum; and Paul the Deacon (1516)
- Ermolao Barbaro's work on Pedanius Dioscorides' De materia medica, dedicated to Doge Loredan (1516)
- Cicero, De officiis, Cato Maior de senectute, Laelius de amicitia and Somnium Scipionis (1519)
- Thomas Aquinas, Summa contra gentiles, with the commentary of Francesco Silvestri (1524)
- Ovid, Metamorphoses (1527)
- a volume containing Aulus Cornelius Celsus, Medicinae, and Serenus Sammonicus, Liber de medicina, dedicated to Cardinal Ercole Gonzaga (1528)
- Leonhardus Porcius, De sestertio, pecuniis, ponderibus et mensuris antiquis (n.d.)

Several of these editions superseded previous less carefully edited editions. His most renowned was the annotated edition of Suetonius. In his preface to Porcius, Egnazio defended his author's priority in writing about ancient weights and measures against the claims of Guillaume Budé.

The only Greek work published by Egnazio was his edition of Arrian's Anabasis of Alexander, edited with the help of Vittore Trincavelli. It was dedicated to the grand chancellor Andrea de' Franceschi and published at Venice in 1535.

=== Writings ===
Egnazio wrote only two lengthy works. His first was a series of biographies of Roman emperors entitled De Caesaribus for its first printing in 1516. It was retitled De principibus Romanorum for its second edition in 1519. In both editions it is accompanied by sets of biographies drawn from Giorgio Merula's translation of Dio Cassius and from the Historia Augusta, with annotations by Egnazio. A French translation appeared in 1529 and an Italian one in 1540. De Caesaribus is divided into three books. The first goes from Julius Caesar to Baldwin II. The second covers the Byzantine Empire down to the fall of Constantinople. The third covers the Holy Roman Empire from Charlemagne to Maximilian I. Extracts from the second book were published at Paris in 1539 under the title De origine Turcorum (On the Origins of the Turks).

The second work was a Venetian biographical dictionary, De exemplis illustrium virorum Venetae civitatis atque aliarum gentium, modeled on the work of Valerius Maximus, for which he has been called "the Venetian Valerius Maximus". He began work on this as early as 1512, but it was only published posthumously at Venice in 1554. It was also printed at Paris a few months later. It includes three examples of Venetians of humble birth (like himself) whose memory he consciously sought to preserve.

Egnazio's panegyric to Francis was published at Milan in 1515 and at Venice in 1540. His only other known poems are the 29-line Pro Codro Medici ad Lusitaniae Regem and the 31-line Pro Bononio suo, preserved in a manuscript of Girolamo Bologni kept in the Museo Correr.

According to Francesco Sansovino, Egnazio composed some seventy orations, but this is probably an exaggeration. Eight examples are known, including the funeral orations for Lorenzo Suárez (1501), Benedetto Brugnoli (1502), Niccolò di Pitigliano (1509), the grand chancellor Luigi Dardano (1511), the papal nuncio Pietro Dovizi di Bibbiena (1514) and the cardinal Marco Cornaro (1524), as well as two speeches entitled De optimo cive (1535) and Oratio de beneficentia (year unknown). Only four of these were published Those for Suárez, Brugnoli and Pitigliano were published at Venice in the year of delivery and that for Dardano in 1524. The other four are unpublished. The autograph manuscript of De optimo cive is in the Biblioteca Marciana.

Egnazio wrote many letters. His letters to Matteo Avogadro, Romolo Amaseo, Jean Grolier (1518), Friedrich Nausea (1520), Giovanni Francesco Conti (1526), Niccolò Leonico (1530) and Pier Cordato (1549) have been published, as well as his five to Willibald Pirckheimer (1527–1529). His correspondence with Erasmus has also been published, including three of his letters (1517, 1533, 1534) and six of Erasmus's (1525–1531). Several of his letters to Giustiniani, as well as letters to Pietro Bembo, Bernardino Trinagio, Lodovico Spinola and Balo Italo da Rimini, are unpublished. A letter he wrote to Cardinal Alessandro Farnese in 1538 does not survive, but is known from the cardinal's response. A letter he wrote to Philipp Melanchthon in 1534 survives, as does Melanchthon's letter to him from 1543.

== Bibliography ==
- Giraldi, Lilio Gregorio (2011). Grant, John (ed.). Modern Poets. Harvard University Press.
- Ilić, Luka (2014). Theologian of Sin and Grace: The Process of Radicalization in the Theology of Matthias Flacius Illyricus (PDF). Vandenhoeck & Ruprecht.
- Lowry, Martin J. C. (1976). "The 'New Academy' of Aldus Manutius: A Renaissance Dream". Bulletin of the John Rylands Library. 58 (2): 378–420. doi:10.7227/bjrl.58.2.6.
- Lowry, Martin J. C. (1979). The World of Aldus Manutius: Business and Scholarship in Renaissance Venice. Basil Blackwell.
- Lowry, Martin J. C. (1986). "Giambattista Egnazio of Venice, 1473 – 4 July 1553". In Peter G. Bietenholz (ed.). Contemporaries of Erasmus. Vol. 1. University of Toronto Press. pp. 424–425.
- Mioni, Elpidio (1981). "Cipelli, Giovanni Battista". Dizionario Biografico degli Italiani (in Italian). Vol. 25: Chinzer–Cirni. Rome: Institute of the Italian Encyclopaedia. pp. 698–702. ISBN 978-88-12-00032-6.
- Ross, James Bruce (1976). "Venetian Schools and Teachers Fourteenth to Early Sixteenth Century: A Survey and a Study of Giovanni Battista Egnazio". Renaissance Quarterly. 29 (4): 521–566. doi:10.2307/2860032. JSTOR 2860032.
