= Francesco Cattani da Diacceto (1531–1595) =

Italian bishop and writer (1531–1595)

- Bishop of Fiesole
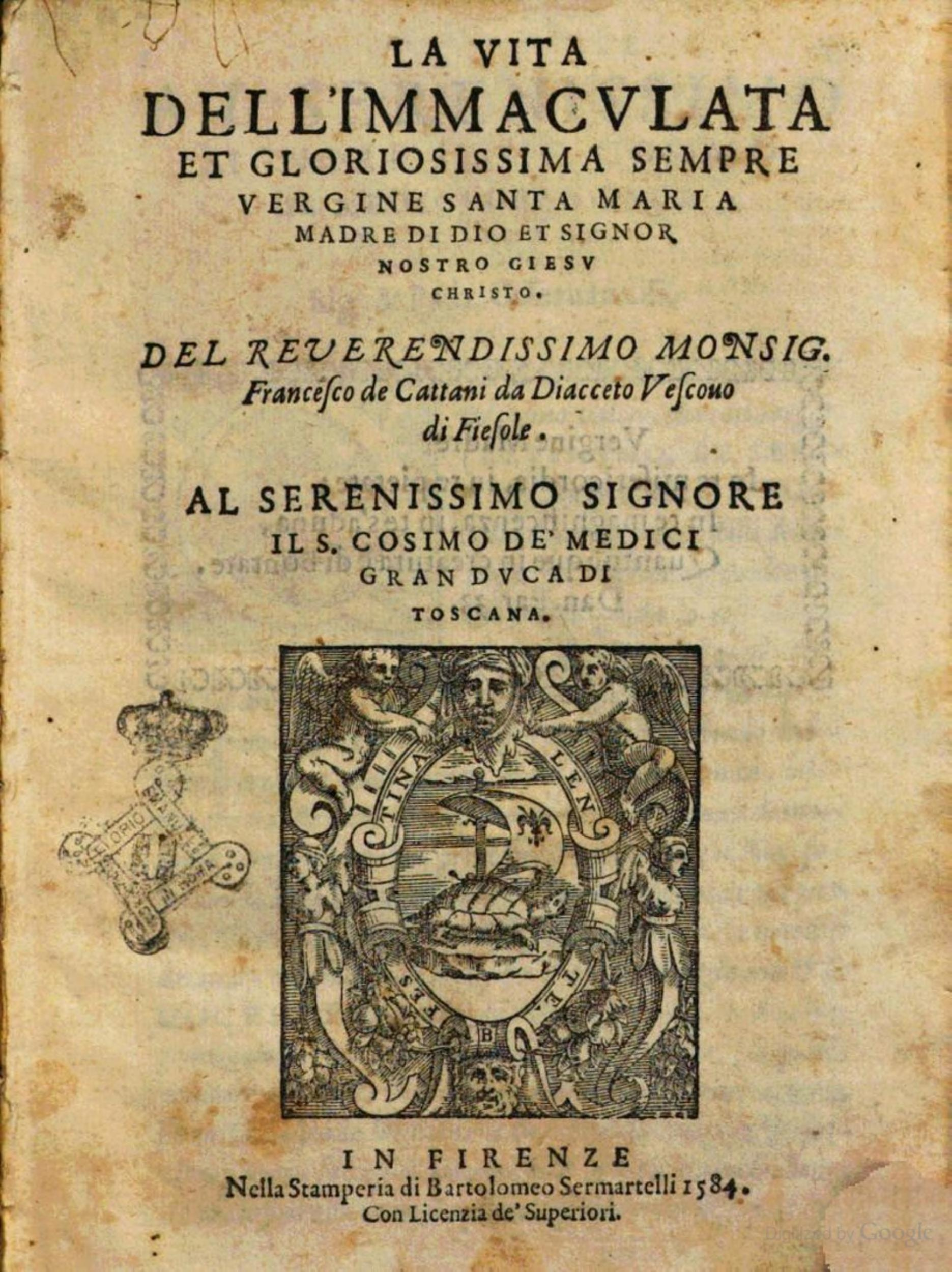
- Title-page of La vita dell'immaculata et gloriosissima sempre vergine santa Maria madre di Dio, published in Florence in 1584
- Church: Catholic Church
- Diocese: Diocese of Fiesole
- Appointed: 11 August 1570

Personal details
- Born: 2 September 1531 Florence, Republic of Florence
- Died: 4 November 1595 (aged 64) Florence, Grand Duchy of Tuscany

Francesco Cattani da Diacceto (2 September 1531 – 4 November 1595), often referred to as Francesco Cattani da Diacceto il Giovane in order to distinguish him from his grandfather, the philosopher Francesco di Zanobi Cattani da Diacceto (1466–1522), was Bishop of Fiesole from 1570 until his death in 1595 and author of several works including an Essamerone ("Hexameron") and a translation into vernacular Florentine Italian of the Hexaëmeron and De Officiis Clericorum of Saint Ambrose.

== Life ==
Cattani di Diacceto was born on 2 September 1531 to Dionigi Cattani di Diacceto and Maria di Guglielmo Martini. His father was one of the thirteen children of the noted philosopher Francesco di Zanobi Cattani da Diacceto, sometimes dubbed "Il Vecchio" or "Il Pagonazzo" to distinguish him from his grandson.

In 1546 Cattani became a canon of the Cathedral of Florence, and by 1558 was an apostolic pronotary. On 11 August 1570 he was named Bishop of Fiesole, on the retirement of his uncle Angelo Cattani da Diacceto from that post. During the 25 years of his tenure he completed the construction, begun by his uncle, of the monastery of Santa Maria della Neve at Pratovecchio; restored the church of Santa Maria in Campo in Florence and the Oratory of San Jacopo in the Bishop's Palace of Fiesole; and supervised the restoration of the Duomo of Fiesole, giving the apse its present form.

He had studied civil law and theology, and as a young man had been associated with the Accademia fiorentina of Marsilio Ficino. He was a prolific writer on religious topics. He attempted to collect and publish the works, in Latin and Italian, of his grandfather Francesco di Zanobi Cattani da Diacceto, and commissioned Benedetto Varchi to write his biography. This was published together with the Tre libri d’amore e un panegirico all’amore of the elder Cattani in Venice in 1561.

He died on 4 November 1595; he was buried in the Oratory of San Jacopo in the Episcopal Palace of Fiesole.

== Works ==
His published works include:

- Gli uffici di S. Ambruogio vescouo di Milano: in volgar fiorentino. Fiorenza: Lorenzo Torrentino, 1558.
- Homelie del reverendo m. Francesco Cattani da Diacetto Sopra la sequenza del corpo di Christo. Fiorenza,: appresso L. Torrentino, 1559.
- L'Essamerone di S. Ambruogio tradotto in volgar Fiorentino per M. Francesco Cattani da Diacceto. Fiorenza: Lorenzo Torrentino, 1560.
- Discorso dell'autorità del Papa sopra 'l Concilio. Fiorenza: appresso i Giunti, 1562.
- Instituzione spirituale de Messer Lodovico Blosio: Utilissima a coloro, che aspirano alla perfezzione della vita. Fiorenza: Giunti, 1562.
- L'Essamerone del Reverendo M. Franceso Cattani da Diacceto. In Fiorenza: appresso Lorenzo Torrentino, 1563.
- Discorso del reuerendo m. Francesco de Cattani da Diacceto ... sopra la superstizzione dell'arte magica. In Fiorenza: appresso Valente Panizzi & Marco Peri, circa 1567.
- La vita dell'immaculata et gloriosissima sempre vergine santa Maria madre di Dio et signor nostro Giesu Christo. In Firenze: Nella Stamperia di Bartolomeo Sermartelli, 1584.

Catholic Church titles
Preceded by Angelo Cattani da Diacceto	Bishop of Fiesole; 1570–1595	Succeeded by Alessandro Marzi de' Medici
