= De vita libri tres =

Treatise by Marsilio Ficino

The De vita libri tres (Three Books on Life), or De triplici vita, was written in the years 1480–1489 by Italian Platonist Marsilio Ficino. It was first circulated in manuscript form and then published on December 3, 1489. It was constantly in print through the middle of the seventeenth century.

The first book is about physical health, the second is about prolonging life, and the third (De vita coelitùs comparanda) is about astral influences. The work focuses not on the soul or body, but on the spiritus, which is described early on:

only the priests of the Muses, only the hunters after the supreme good and truth are so negligent (alas) and so unfortunate that they seem utterly to neglect that instrument by which they can, in a way, measure and grasp the whole world. An instrument of this sort is the spirit, which by the physicians is defined as a certain vapour of the blood, pure, subtle, hot and lucid. And, formed from the subtler blood by the heat of the heart, it flies to the brain, and there the soul assiduously employs it for the exercise of both the interior and exterior senses. Thus the blood serves the spirit, the spirit the senses, and finally the senses reason.

— I, ii

The work focuses on the health and well-being of the scholar. Scholars are described as being naturally prone to extremes of melancholy and thus the ambivalent influence of Saturn, which can be remediated by the influence of the benign planets (the Sun, Jupiter, Venus and Mercury). Ficino considers three types of things beneficial to the spirit: wines and aromatic substances, odours and clean air, and music. Music is described as probably the most important:

if the vapours exhaled by merely vegetable life are greatly beneficial to your life, how beneficial do you think will be aerial songs to the spirit which is indeed entirely aerial, harmonic songs to the harmonic spirit, warm and thus living to the living, endowed with sense to the sensitive, conceived by reason to the rational?

— II, xv

De vita is an amalgam of philosophy, medicine, magic and astrology. Alongside passages explaining the immortality and divine source and nature of the soul, there are astrological charts and remedies, speeches from various Greek gods arguing with one another, philosophical digressions, medieval prescriptions for various ills, attempts at reconciling the Neoplatonism of Plotinus with Christian scripture, and magical remedies and talismans.

Ficino was one of the major philosophical voices of the Italian Renaissance, but he was also a physician, and the son of a physician. De vita is an example of the medical thinking of the early Renaissance, steeped in Galen and Hippocrates and the theory of the four humors and their attendant Aristotelian qualities (e.g., hot, cold, moist, dry), but also beginning to align this viewpoint with the awakening sense of the archetypal significance of the pagan gods, derived from the first exposure in the West for many centuries to the dialogues of Plato and to the Hermetica. (Ficino was the first translator of Plato into Latin.)

The result—particularly in the third book—is a work which takes the pagan Classical god-archetypes quite literally, and personifies them with the planets which are named for them. For Ficino, the planets affect the tenor and vigor of the intellectual's mind and the health of his body. But the main thrust of de Vita is the notion that there are remedies and balances that can be undertaken to mitigate their effect—in fact, to change the temper, even the fate, of a human being. In this regard, Ficino shows his deeply humanist point of view, which sets him apart from earlier writers.

The book's thrust depends on the tension Ficino tries to resolve intellectually—a tension that is typical of the syncretism of much of the early Renaissance—between Classical philosophy and religion and Christian belief. By filtering both through cosmology of Plato, Ficino attempts to reconcile these world-views.

An English translation by Charles Boer of the De vita was published in 1982.

A critical edition and English translation of the Three Books on Life, with the Latin on one page and the English translation on the facing page, with Introduction and Notes, by Carol V. Kaske and John R. Clark, was re-published in 1998 and again in 2002 by The Arizona Center for Medieval and Renaissance Studies, in conjunction with The Renaissance Society of America.
