= Francesco Vettori =

Italian diplomat (1474–1540)

Coat of arms of the Vettori family.

Francesco Vettori (1474–1539) was an Italian diplomat, politician and writer from Florence. He served his city during both the republican and the Medici regimes. He is remembered chiefly as one of the main personal correspondents of Niccolò Machiavelli, but he also published some small works himself in the same period.

Vettori's correspondence with Machiavelli includes some of the only surviving written discussions about the writing of Machiavelli's "little work", which was to become The Prince. The correspondence is considered to be amongst the most well known in the Italian language.

Other works by Vettori are a Sommario della istoria d'Italia ("Summary of the History of Italy") and a collection of stories called Viaggio in Alamagna ("Journey in Germany").
