= Marsilio Ficino =

Italian philosopher and Catholic priest (1433–1499)

The Reverend Marsilio Ficino
- Portrait of Marsilio Ficino, attributed to Cristofano dell'Altissimo
- Born: 19 October 1433; Figline Valdarno, Republic of Florence
- Died: 1 October 1499 (aged 65); Careggi, Republic of Florence

Philosophical work
- Era: Renaissance philosophy
- Region: Western philosophy
- School: Christian humanism Neohermeticism; Neoplatonism; Augustinianism; Thomism
- Institutions: Platonic Academy of Florence
- Main interests: Theology, Platonism, Astrology, Metaphysics
- Notable works: De Christiana religione (1474); Theologia Platonica de immortalitate animae (1482); De amore (1484); De vita libri tres (1489)
- Notable ideas: Platonic love Prisca theologia

Marsilio Ficino (Italian: [marˈsiːljo fiˈtʃiːno]; Latin name: Marsilius Ficinus; 19 October 1433 – 1 October 1499) was an Italian scholar and Catholic priest who was one of the most influential humanist philosophers of the early Italian Renaissance. He was a physician, an astrologer, a reviver of Neoplatonism in touch with the major academics and religious orders of his day, and the first translator of Plato's complete extant works into Latin. His Florentine Academy, an attempt to revive Plato's Academy, influenced the direction and tenor of the Italian Renaissance and the development of European philosophy.

== Early life ==
Ficino was born at Figline Valdarno. His father, Diotifeci d'Agnolo, was a physician under the patronage of Cosimo de' Medici, who took the young man into his household and became the lifelong patron of Marsilio, who was made tutor to his grandson, Lorenzo de' Medici. Giovanni Pico della Mirandola, the Italian humanist philosopher and scholar, was another of his students. According to Italian historian Cesare Baronio, prior to his ordination into the Catholic priesthood, and to his acquaintance with either the Medici family or Plato, Ficino and his close friend Michele Mercati were both initially Epicureans. But upon philosophical conversion to Platonism had made a pact that whomever passed away first would have to make contact with the other and give an indication of how affairs stood in the next life. A legend grew that Ficino, after he passed returned as an apparition on a white galloping steed past Mercati's house, far from Florence where Ficino had lived, proclaiming that everything they had discussed had been true.

== Career and thought ==
=== Platonic Academy ===
During the sessions at Florence of the Council of Ferrara-Florence in 1438–1445, when attempts to heal the schism of the Eastern (Orthodox) and Western (Catholic) churches had thus far failed, Cosimo de' Medici and his intellectual circle had made acquaintance with the Neoplatonic philosopher George Gemistos Plethon, whose discourses upon Plato and the Alexandrian mystics so fascinated the humanists of Florence that they named him the second Plato. In 1459 John Argyropoulos was lecturing on Greek language and literature at Florence, and Ficino became his pupil.

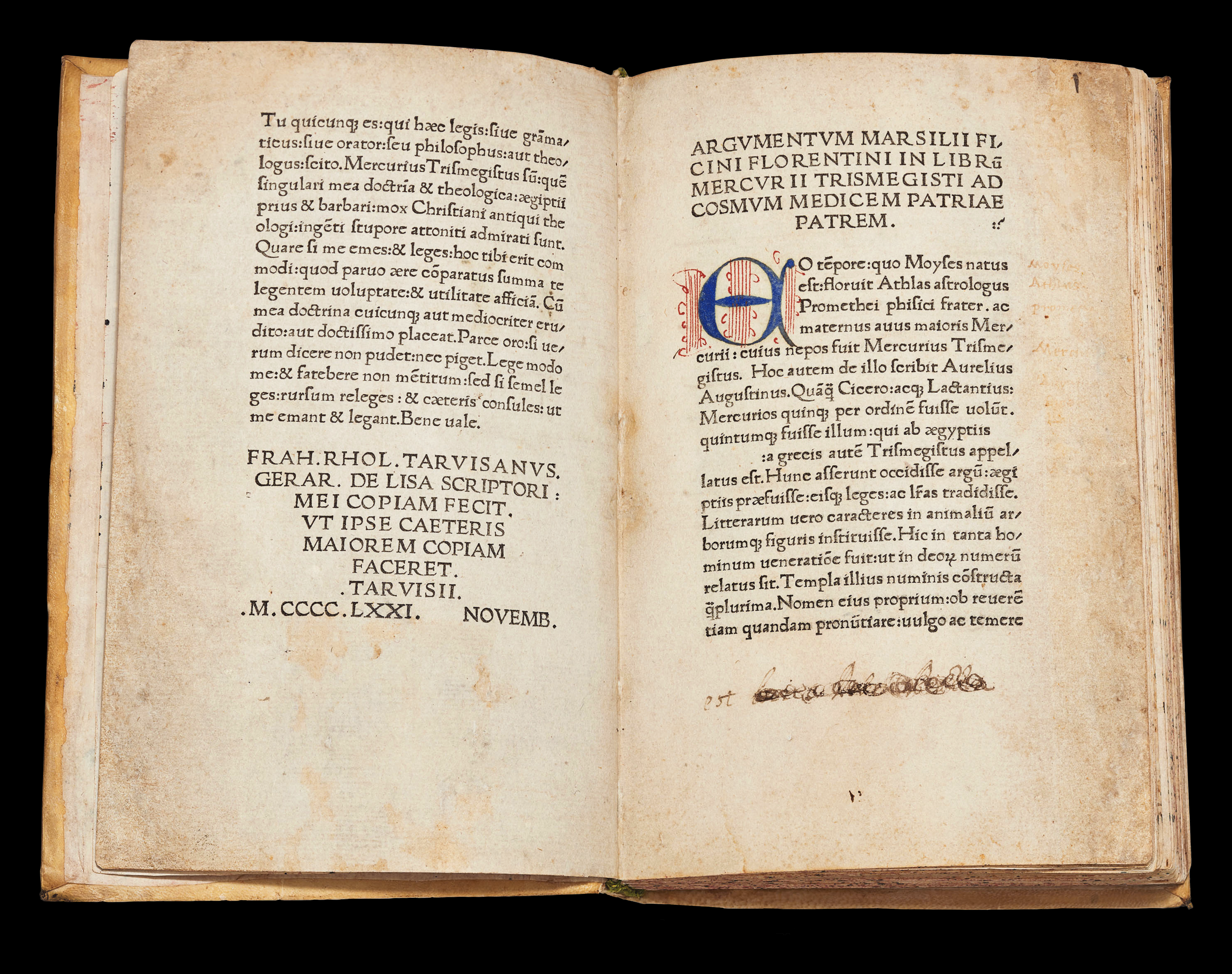
Corpus Hermeticum: first Latin edition, by Marsilio Ficino, 1471.

When Cosimo decided to refound Plato's Academy at Florence, he chose Ficino as its head. In 1462, Cosimo supplied Ficino with Greek manuscripts of Plato's work, whereupon Ficino started translating the entire corpus into Latin (draft translation of the dialogues finished 1468–69; published 1484). Ficino also produced a translation of a collection of Hellenistic Greek documents found by Leonardo da Pistoia later called Hermetica, and the writings of many of the Neoplatonists, including Porphyry, Iamblichus, and Plotinus.

Among his many students were Niccolò Valori and Francesco Cattani da Diacceto. The latter was considered by Ficino to be his successor as the head of the Florentine Platonic Academy. Diacceto's student, Giovanni di Bardo Corsi, produced a short biography of Ficino in 1506.

=== Theology, astrology, and the soul ===
Zachariah in the Temple (detail), a fresco by Domenico Ghirlandaio (1486–1490) in the Tornabuoni Chapel, Florence, showing (L-R): Marsilio Ficino, Cristoforo Landino, Angelo Poliziano and Gentile de' Becchi or Demetrios Chalkondyles

Though trained as a physician, Ficino became a priest in 1473. In 1474 Ficino completed his treatise on the immortality of the soul, Theologia Platonica de immortalitate animae (Platonic Theology) and De Christiana Religione (On the Christian Religion), a history of religions and defense of Christianity. In the rush of enthusiasm for every rediscovery from Antiquity, he exhibited some interest in the arts of astrology (despite denigrating it in relation to divine revelation), which landed him in trouble with the Catholic Church. In 1489 he was accused of heresy before Pope Innocent VIII and was acquitted. In 1494 towards the end of his writing period, he penned the De Sole treatise to Piero de Medici in order to revise his position on astrology as "not dogmatic" but rather "allegorical and anagogic." A sentiment he shared with Philippo Valori in his defense years prior, and later in letters to Poliziano, in the same year as the De Sole.

Writing in 1492 Ficino proclaimed:

"This century, like a golden age, has restored to light the liberal arts, which were almost extinct: grammar, poetry, rhetoric, painting, sculpture, architecture, music ... this century appears to have perfected astrology."

— Marcilio Ficino, A letter to a friend (1492)

Ficino's letters, extending over the years 1474–1494, survive and have been published. He wrote De amore (Of Love) in 1484. De vita libri tres (Three books on life), or De triplici vita (The Book of Life), published in 1489, provides a great deal of medical and astrological advice for maintaining health and vigor, as well as espousing the Neoplatonist view of the world's ensoulment and its integration with the human soul:

There will be some men or other, superstitious and blind, who see life plain in even the lowest animals and the meanest plants, but do not see life in the heavens or the world ... Now if those little men grant life to the smallest particles of the world, what folly! what envy! neither to know that the Whole, in which 'we live and move and have our being,' is itself alive, nor to wish this to be so.

One metaphor for this integrated "aliveness" is Ficino's astrology. In the Book of Life, he details the interlinks between behavior and consequence. It talks about a list of things that hold sway over a man's destiny. Regardless, in his later extensive commentary on Plotinus's Ennead III, he actively and systematically repudiated the Neoplatonic account of the soul, the hypostasis Soul's unity, as well as the transmigration of the soul, the soul's eternity as opposed to mere imperishability, and the notion that the soul was created by intermediaries and not by God directly. The latter of which he had also spoken against in the Theologia Platonica. Instead he preferred to interpret all of these more pagan Neoplatonic points, as Stephen Gersh comments in his Analytic Study of the same work, as moral allegories―in keeping with his general tendency towards concordance between Platonism and Christianity. Gersh likewise notes in the same study that the fundamental concept that holds together the "deep structure" of Ficino's thought is that of concordia.

=== Medical works ===
Probably due to early influences from his father, Diotifeci, who was a doctor to Cosimo de' Medici, Ficino published Latin and Italian treatises on medical subjects such as Consiglio contro la pestilenza (Recommendations for the treatment of the plague) and De vita libri tres (Three books on life). His medical works exerted considerable influence on Renaissance physicians such as Paracelsus, with whom he shared the perception on the unity of the microcosmos and macrocosmos, and their interactions, through somatic and psychological manifestations, with the aim to investigate their signatures to cure diseases. Those works, which were very popular at the time, dealt with astrological and alchemical concepts. Thus Ficino came under the suspicion of heresy; especially after the publication of the third book in 1489, which contained specific instructions on healthful living in a world of demons and other spirits.

=== Platonic love ===
Notably, Ficino coined the term Platonic love, which first appeared in his letter to Alamanno Donati in 1476. In 1492, Ficino published Epistulae (Epistles), which contained Platonic love letters, written in Latin, to his academic colleague and life-long friend, Giovanni Cavalcanti, concerning the nature of Platonic love. Because of this, some have alleged Ficino was a homosexual, but this finds little basis in his letters or his general works and philosophy. In his commentary on the Republic, too, he specifically denies to his readers that the homosexual references made in Plato's dialogue were anything more than to bemuse the audience, "spoken merely to relieve the feeling of heaviness". Regardless, Ficino's letters to Cavalcanti, and especially his De Amore treatise commenting on Plato's Symposium resulted in the popularization of the notion Platonic love in Western Europe.

== Death ==
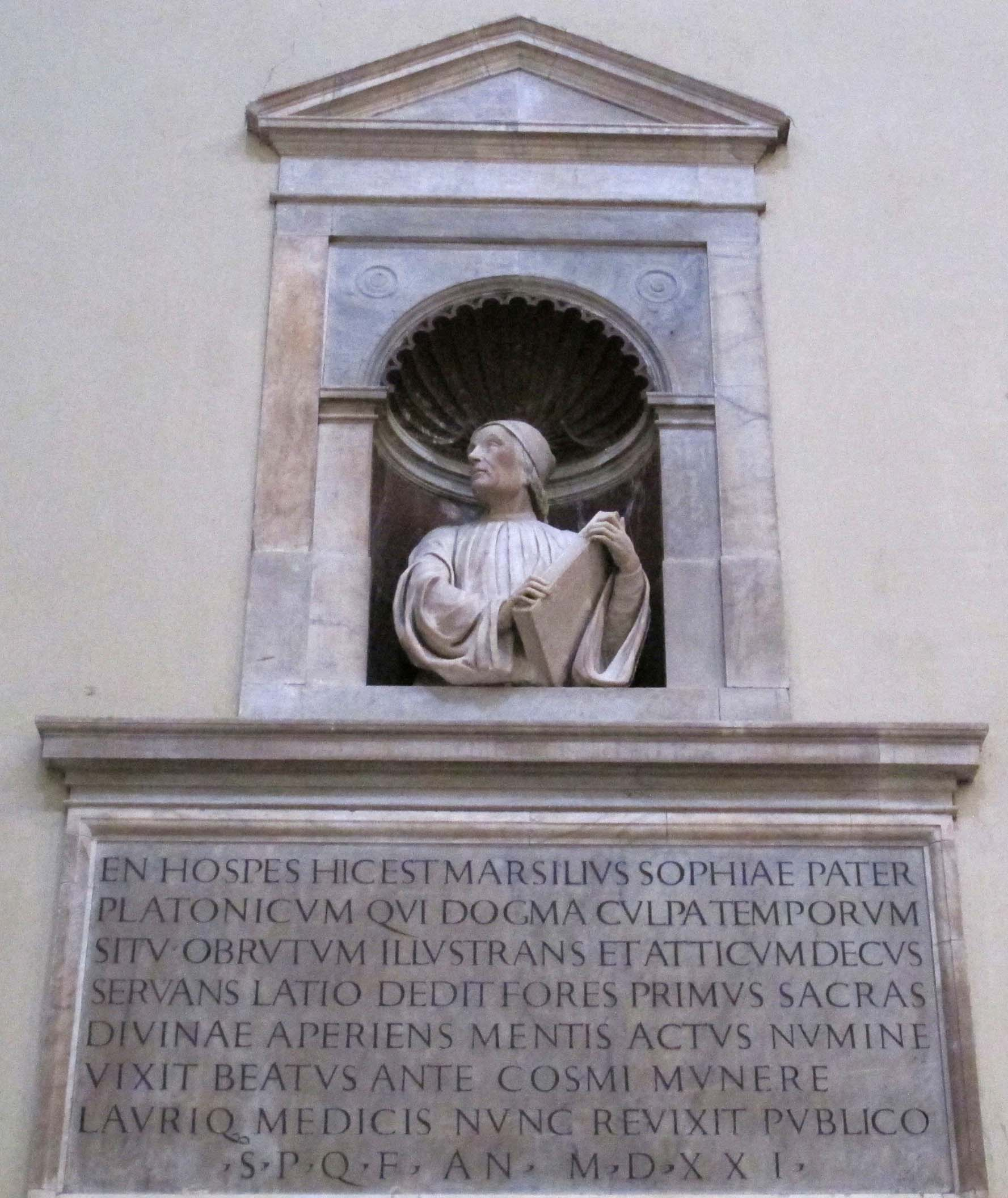
Bust of Marsilio Ficino in the Duomo di Firenze (Cattedrale di Santa Maria del Fiore), where his body was buried.

Ficino died on 1 October 1499 at Careggi. In 1521 his memory was honored with a bust sculpted by Andrea Ferrucci, which is located in the south side of the nave in the Cathedral of Santa Maria del Fiore.

== Works ==
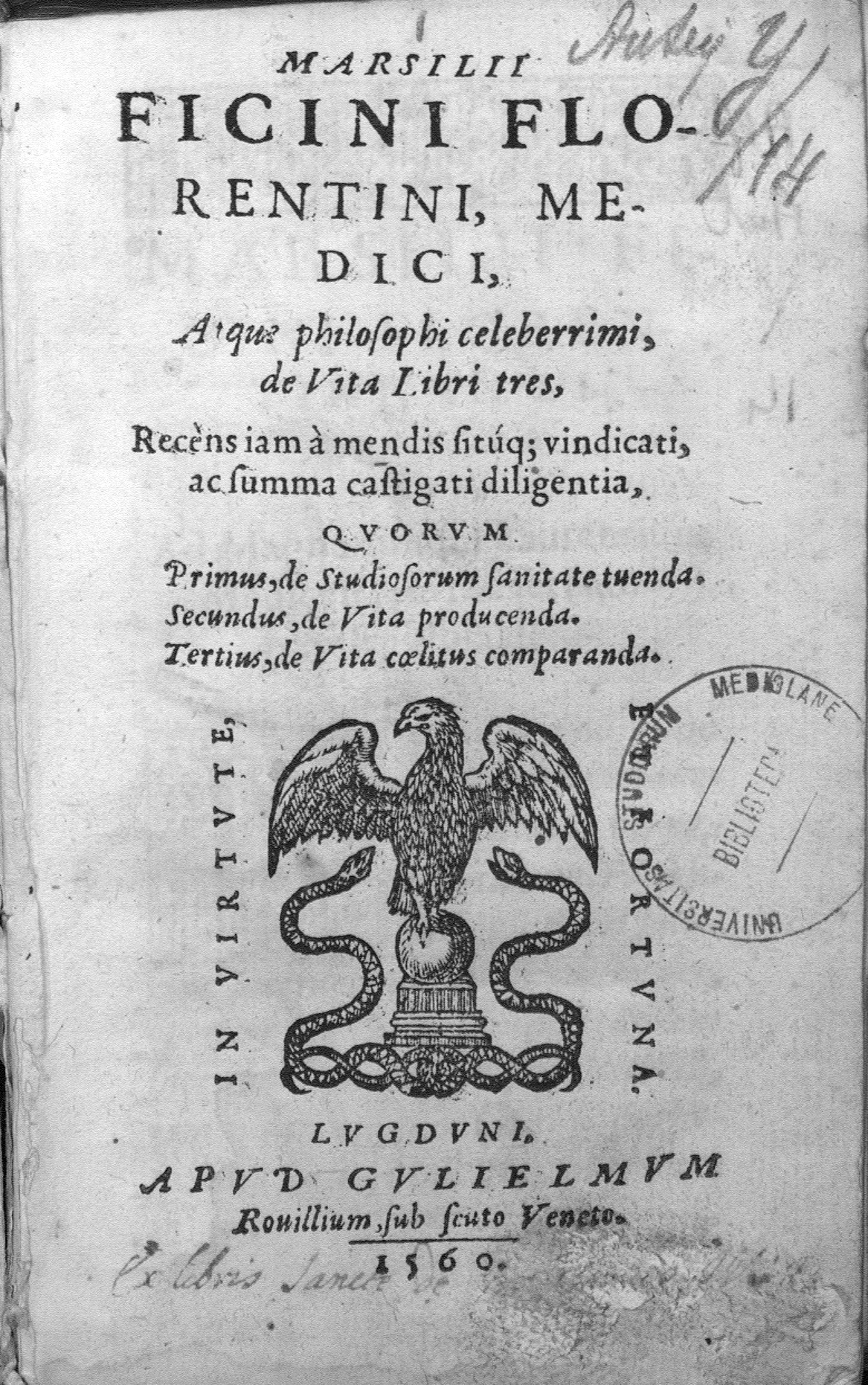
De triplici vita, 1560

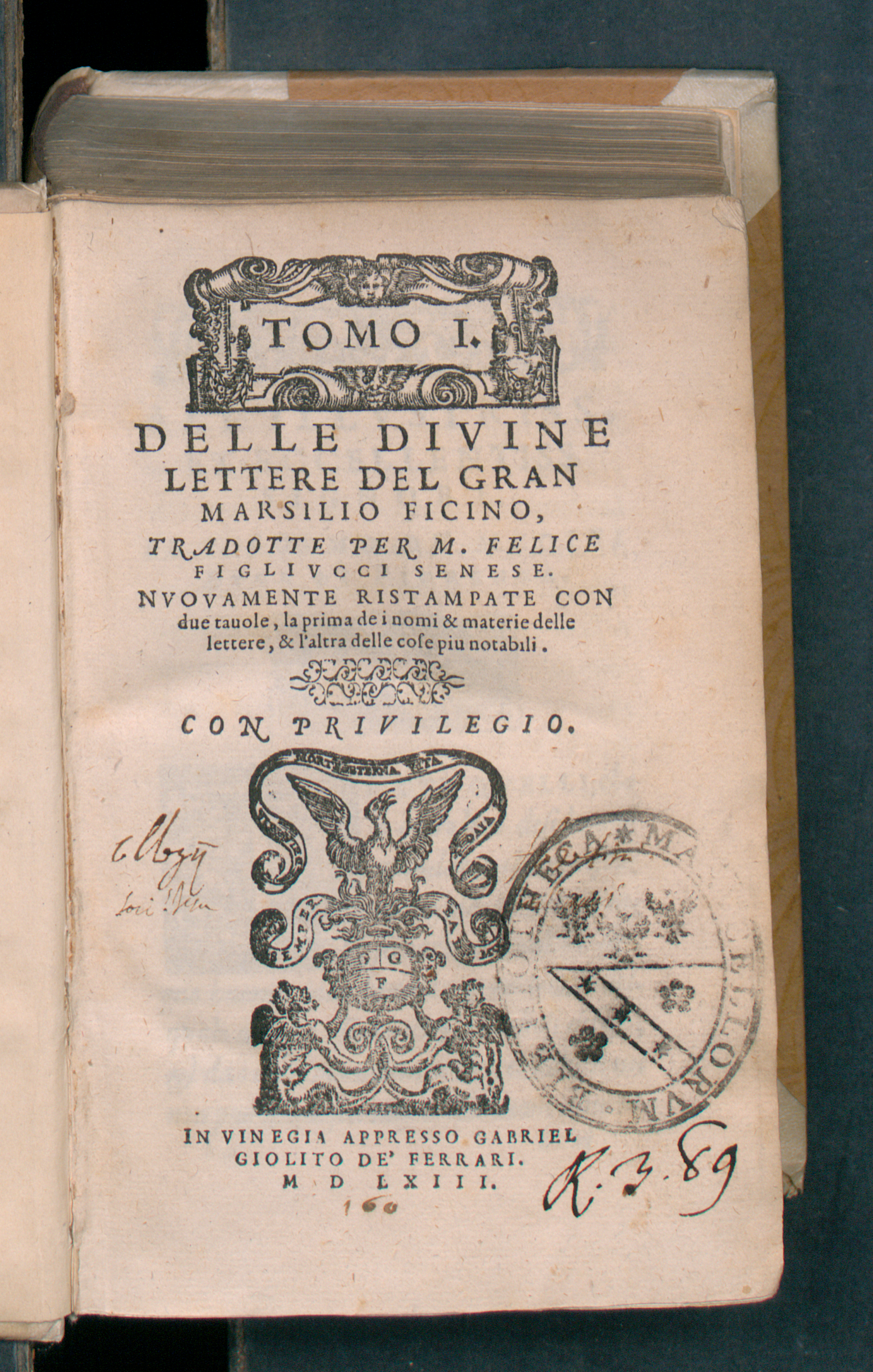
Delle divine lettere del gran Marsilio Ficino (1563)

- Theologia Platonica de immortalitate animae (Platonic Theology). Harvard U. P., Latin with English translation.
  - vol. 1, 2001, ISBN 0-674-00345-4
  - vol. 2, 2002, ISBN 0-674-00764-6
  - vol. 3, 2003, ISBN 0-674-01065-5
  - vol. 4, 2004, ISBN 0-674-01482-0
  - vol. 5, 2005, ISBN 0-674-01719-6
  - vol. 6 with index, 2006, ISBN 0-674-01986-5
- The Letters of Marsilio Ficino, transl. by the Language Department of the School of Economic Science (Shepheard-Walwyn, 1975–2013). (With extensive endnotes.)
  - vol. I, 1975, ISBN 978-0-85683-010-5
  - vol. II, 1978, ISBN 978-0-85683-036-5
  - vol. III, 1981, ISBN 978-0-85683-045-7
  - vol. IV, 1988, ISBN 978-0-85683-070-9
  - vol. V, 1994, ISBN 978-0-85683-129-4
  - vol. VI, 1999, ISBN 978-0-85683-167-6
  - vol. VII, 2003, ISBN 978-0-85683-192-8
  - vol. VIII, 2010, ISBN 978-0-85683-242-0
  - vol. IX, 2013, ISBN 978-0-85683-289-5

=== Commentaries ===
- Gardens of Philosophy: Ficino on Plato, ed. and transl. by Arthur Farndell (Shepheard-Walwyn, 2006). ISBN 978-0-85683-240-6 This, the first volume in a five-volume series, provides the first English translation of the 25 short commentaries on the dialogues and the 12 letters traditionally ascribed to Plato. The volume contains the following:
  - Ficino's Preface to his Commentaries on Plato [addressed to Lorenzo de' Medici].
  - Hipparchus: The Desire for Gain
  - Philosophy or The Lover
  - Theages: Wisdom
  - Meno: Virtue
  - Alcibiades I: Nature of Man
  - Alcibiades II: Prayer
  - Minos: Law
  - Euthyphro: Holiness
  - Hippias: The Beautiful and Noble
  - Lysis: Friendship
  - Theatetus: Knowledge
  - Ion: Poetic Inspiration
  - Statesman: Kingship
  - Protagoras: Virtue
  - Euthydemus: The Views of the Sophists
  - Lesser Hippias: Truthfulness
  - Charmides: Temperance
  - Laches: Courage
  - Cratylus: Names
  - Gorgias: Rhetoric
  - Apology: Socrates' Defense
  - Crito: Socrates' Way of Life
  - Phaedo: Nature of the Soul
  - Menexenus: Love for One's Country
  - Critias: Story of Atlantis
  - Discussions of Plato's twelve letters
  - Two of Ficino's other prefaces to the dialogues and their commentaries
- Evermore Shall Be So: Ficino on Plato's Parmenides, ed. and transl. by Arthur Farndell (Shepheard Walwyn, 2008). (Does not include Latin text.) ISBN 978-0-85683-256-7
- When Philosophers Rule: Ficino on Plato's Republic, Laws, and Epinomis, ed. and transl. by Arthur Farndell (Shepheard-Walwyn, 2009). ISBN 978-0-85683-257-4 (Unabridged except for the commentary on Republic, bk. 8; see Nuptial Arithmetic, below.)
- All Things Natural: Ficino on Plato's Timaeus, ed. and transl. by Arthur Farndell (Shepheard-Walwyn, 2010). ISBN 978-0-85683-258-1
- On the Nature of Love: Ficino on Plato's Symposium, ed. and transl. by Arthur Farndell (Shepheard-Walwyn, 2016). ISBN 978-0-85683-509-4
- Marsilio Ficino, In Plotinum – Plotinkommentar, ed. and transl. by Peter Riemer und Clemens Zintzen. 3 volumes (Olms, 2020). ISBN 978-3-487-15811-2

=== Other translations of commentaries ===
- Commentaries on Plato. I Tatti Renaissance Library. Bilingual, annotated English/Latin editions of Ficino's commentaries on the works of Plato.
  - vol. 1, 2008, Phaedrus, and Ion, transl. by Michael J. B. Allen, ISBN 0-674-03119-9
  - vol. 2, 2012, Parmenides, pt. 1, transl. by Maude Vanhaelen, ISBN 0-674-06471-2
  - vol. 3, 2012, Parmenides, pt. 2, transl. by Maude Vanhaelen, ISBN 0-674-06472-0
- Commentary on Plato's Symposium on Love, transl. with an introduction and notes by Sears Jayne (Woodstock, CT: Spring Publications, 1985), 2nd edn., 2000, ISBN 0-88214-601-7

=== Other works ===
- Nuptial Arithmetic: Marsilio Ficino's Commentary on the Fatal Number in Book VIII of Plato's Republic, ed. and transl. by Michael J. B. Allen (U. of California P., 1994).
- Icastes. Marsilio Ficino's Interpretation of Plato's Sophist, ed. and transl. by Michael J. B. Allen (Berkeley: U. of California P., 1989).
- The Book of Life, transl. with an introduction by Charles Boer, Dallas: Spring Publications, 1980. ISBN 0-88214-212-7
- De vita libri tres (Three Books on Life, 1489), transl. by Carol V. Kaske and John R. Clarke, Tempe, Arizona: The Renaissance Society of America, 2002. With notes, commentaries, and Latin text on facing pages. ISBN 0-86698-041-5
  - "De triplici vita". World Digital Library (in Latin). 16 September 1489.
- De religione Christiana et fidei pietate (1475–6), dedicated to Lorenzo de' Medici. (English translation below.)
- On the Christian Religion, ed. and transl. by Dan Attrell, Brett Bartlett, and David Porreca (U. of Toronto P., 2022). (With extensive notes, indexes, etc.)
- In Epistolas Pauli commentaria, Marsilii Ficini Epistolae (Venice, 1491; Florence, 1497).
- Meditations on the Soul: Selected letters of Marsilio Ficino, transl. by the Language Department of the School of Economic Science, London. Rochester, Vermont: Inner Traditions International, 1996. ISBN 0-89281-658-9.
- Collected works: Opera (Florence, 1491, Venice, 1516, Basel, 1561).

== See also ==
- Allegorical interpretations of Plato
- Contemporary Italian Renaissance philosophers:
  - Lodovico Lazzarelli
  - Giovanni Mercurio da Correggio
  - Giovanni Pico della Mirandola
- Greek love
- Hermeticism
- Renaissance magic
- Translations (historical)
