= San Gregorio, Venice =

Church building in Venice, Italy

Chiesa di San Gregorio
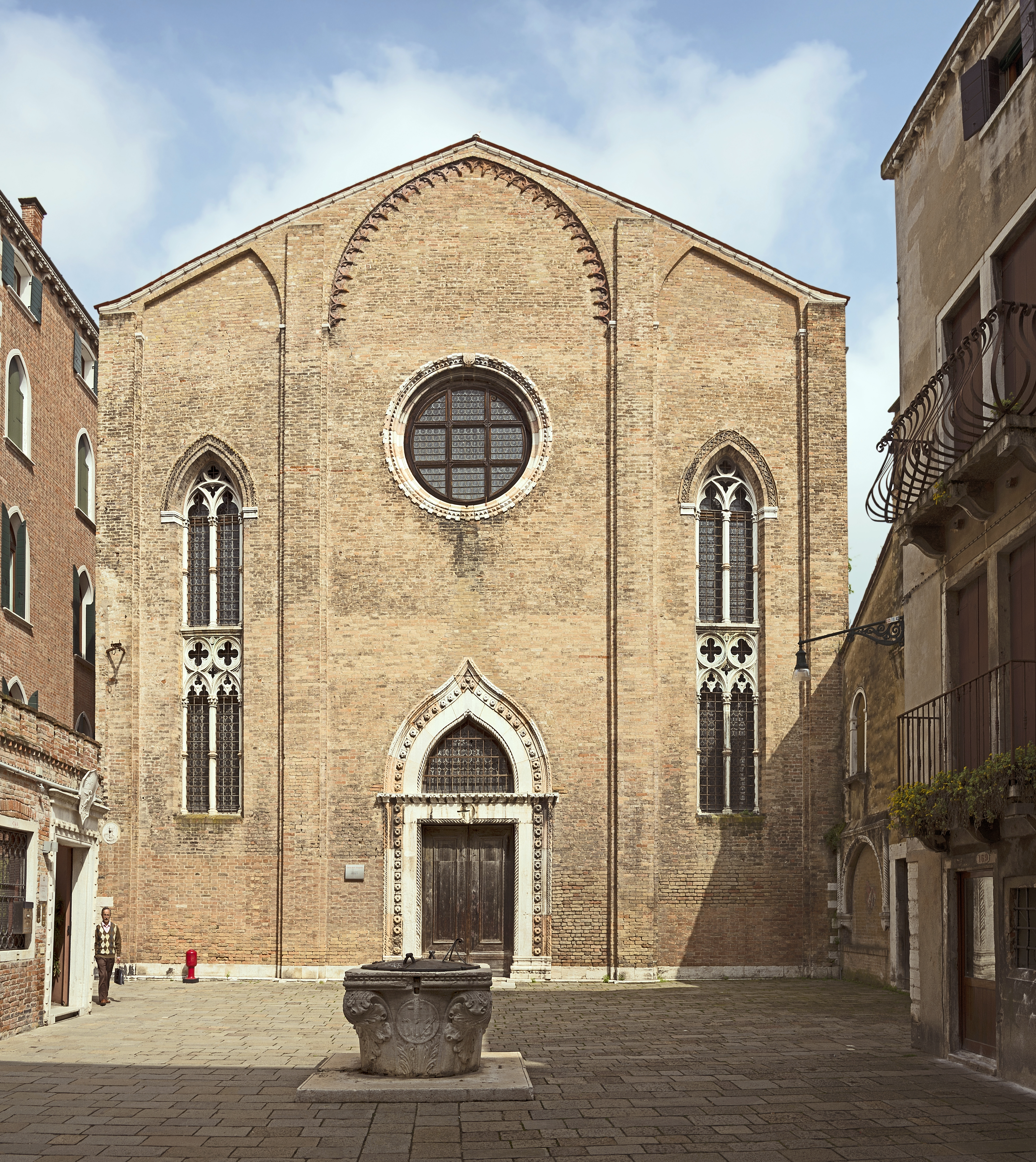
- Facade of San Gregorio, Venice

- Location within Venice Location within Italy

Religion
- Affiliation: Roman Catholic
- Diocese: Dorsoduro
- Province: Venice
- Ecclesiastical or organizational status: Inactive

Location
- Location: Venice, Italy
- Interactive map of Chiesa di San Gregorio
- Coordinates: 45°25′51″N 12°20′02″E

Architecture
- Architect: Antonio Cremonese
- Style: Venetian Gothic
- Completed: 1455

San Gregorio is a former church and abbey in Venice, Italy, located in the sestiere of Dorsoduro. It is not far from the Basilica of Santa Maria della Salute, behind the Palazzo Genovese.

== History ==
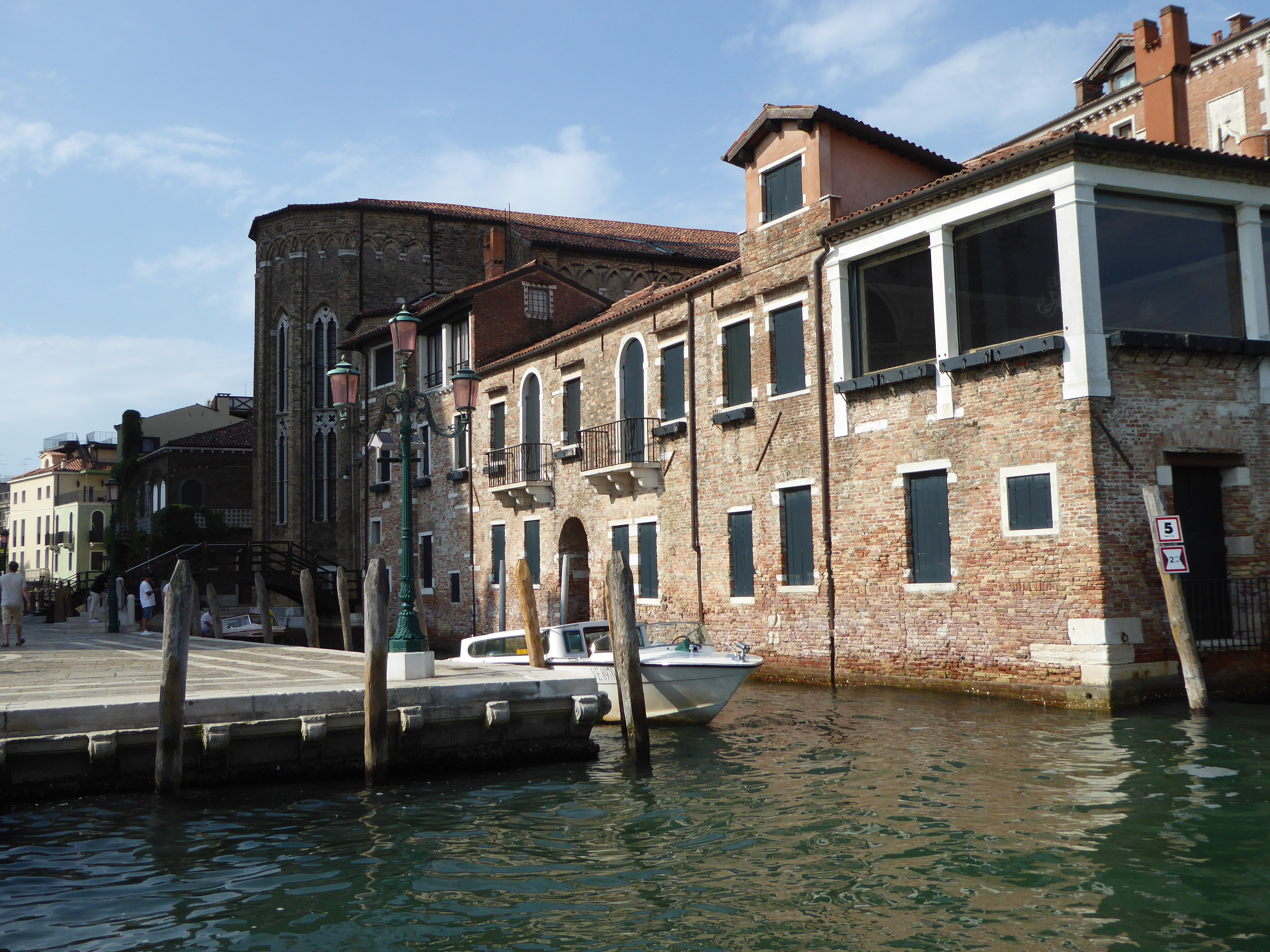
The abbey building seen from the Grand Canal, the triple apse of the church is visible to the left

It was founded in the 9th century and became subject to the Benedictine Abbey of Santi Ilario e Benedetto, which was headquartered at the western edge of the Venetian Lagoon, in 989. Serious flooding resulting from a war between Padua and Venice resulted in the monks of Santi Ilario e Benedetto moving to their Venetian dependency. San Gregorio became the seat of the Benedictine community in 1214. Simultaneously, it also served some of the duties of a parish church and had a close association with Santa Maria Zobenigo.

In the mid-15th century it was rebuilt to the current appearance under design by Antonio da Cremona. An unsuccessful Commenda investment in 1450, intended to finance the reconstruction, initiated a long period of decline, which would last until its ultimate dissolution in 1775. After the dissolution, the church briefly became a parish under the jurisdiction of Santa Maria del Rosario. In 1807, during the Napoleonic occupation of Italy, the parish church was suppressed.

Deconsecrated, the church was converted into a mint for refining gold, while the abbey building was converted to housing. The church was converted to an art restoration laboratory of the Superintendency of Archaeology, Fine Arts and Landscape for the Municipality of Venice and the Lagoon in 1960. The church still stores art as a depository of the Directorate of Museums but is functionally unused, and has experienced structural damage. In 2017, it was announced that San Gregorio was to become the main location of the Museum of Oriental Art, currently at the Ca' Pesaro. However, as of 2025, the church remains disused. The abbey building which was converted to housing after 1775 has partially been converted to exhibit space, and host events for the Venice Biennale.

Canaletto painted some of his Venetian scenes from the first floor of the abbey building. The abbey's cloister has also been a popular artistic subject.

== Structure ==
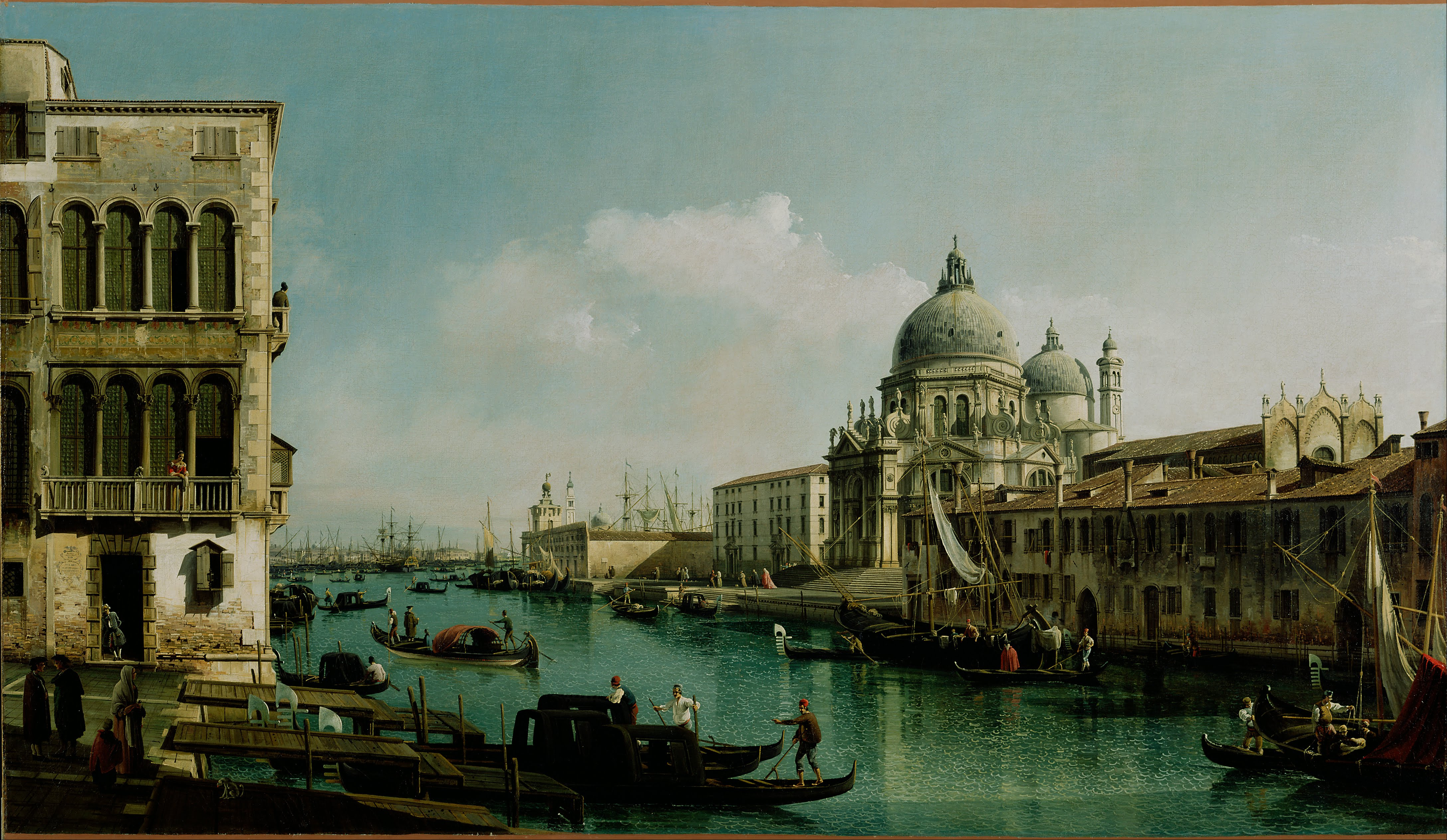
The abbey building and church of San Gregorio can be seen in the center right of this 1743 veduta by Bernardo Bellotto.

The church's main façade is situated on the eponymous Campo di San Gregorio, while the triple apse juts out into the Rio de la Salute. The attached abbey building, a quadrangle built around a small cloister, abuts the Grand Canal. Two bridges on either side of the triple apse cross the Rio de la Salute, making the abbey accessible to visitors to the Fondamenta Salute.

The abbey was originally constructed in a Venetian-Byzantine style, and gained its current Venetian gothic appearance in the mid-15th century. The gabled brick façade is divided into three parts by four lesenes and features an ogival portal and rose window. Elongated mullioned windows with ogival tops are used throughout the church, particularly on the triple apse. The interior shows remnants of frescos and contains a notable truss ceiling in the nave, while the apses have vaulted ceilings.

Views by Canaletto, Bellotto, and other vedutisti show that the façade's lesenes once rose into three ogee arches topped with statues and interspersed with pinnacles. This decoration has since been lost.

== Sources ==
- Brusegan, Marcello (2008). Le chiese di Venezia (in Italian). Newton Compton.
