= Platonic Theology (Ficino) =

Book by Marsilio Ficino

The Platonic Theology (Latin: Theologia platonica de immortalitate animorum) is a work consisting of eighteen books by Marsilio Ficino. Ficino wrote it between 1469 and 1474 and it was published in 1482. It has been described as Ficino's philosophical masterpiece.

== Content ==
The main concern of the work is to set forth a rational argument for the immortality of the human soul. Ficino ascribes to the human soul a middle position in a five-part division of things: between God and angelic beings on the one side, and qualities and bodies on the other. Ficino believed that Platonism was compatible with Christianity, unlike Aristotelianism, which, though ambiguous on the subject of immortality, had been philosophically ascendant since the thirteenth century.

Book IV, chapter 2, is a typical example of one of Ficino's arguments in support of the immortality of the soul. Citing various Platonic texts, alongside works by Augustine and Origen, he attempts to prove that the soul has a natural desire to attain knowledge of the highest truth and the greatest good — knowledge, in other words, of God — and that the satisfaction of this desire is the source of our greatest happiness. Since, however, neither this knowledge nor this happiness can be acquired in the present life, it must be achieved in the next. If this were not the case, then the aspiration, implanted in our minds by God, to penetrate to the cause of all causes and thereby achieve happiness would be useless and futile. The soul, therefore, must be immortal.

— Luc Deitz, Cambridge Translations of Renaissance Philosophical Texts (1997)

Ficino's work was also meant to compete with the ancient Platonic Theology of Proclus. Proclus was widely available to Western scholars via the thirteenth-century translations of the Flemish Dominican, William of Moerbeke. Ficino viewed Proclus as a non-Christian Platonist, and moreover derivative of the "Platonic theology" of Dionysius the Areopagite. Ficino wanted to offer a similar style of Platonist philosophy which nonetheless affirmed Christian belief.

== Audience and influence ==
Ficino directed the Platonic Theology toward his fellow Renaissance ingeniosi, or intellectuals, in the Republic of Florence, including the political elites. In agreement with Plato, in the work Ficino argued for the immortality of the soul, and the Fifth Council of the Lateran was probably influenced by this in its decree Apostolici Regiminis against Christian mortalism.

== Bibliography ==
- Allen, Michael J. B., "Introduction" in Marsilio Ficino: The Philebus Commentary (University of California Press, 1979).
- Allen, Michael J. B. and Hankins, James, "Introduction" in Platonic Theology, Volume 1, Books I–IV (Harvard University Press, 2001).
- Celenza, Christopher S., "Marsilio Ficino" in Zalta, Edward N. (ed.), The Stanford Encyclopedia of Philosophy (Spring 2012 Edition) .
- Ficino, Marsilio, Platonic Theology. In six volumes edited by James Hankins with an English translation by Michael J. B. Allen (Harvard University Press, 2001).
- Stephen Gersh (15 September 2014). Interpreting Proclus. Cambridge University Press. ISBN 978-0-521-19849-3.
- Lauster, Jörg, "Marsilio Ficino as Christian thinker: The theological aspects of his Platonism" in Allen, Rees, and Davies (eds.), Marsilio Ficino: His Theology, His Philosophy, His Legacy (Brill Publishers, 2002), pp. 45–70.
