= Francesco Cattani da Diacceto =

Italian philosopher (1466–1522)

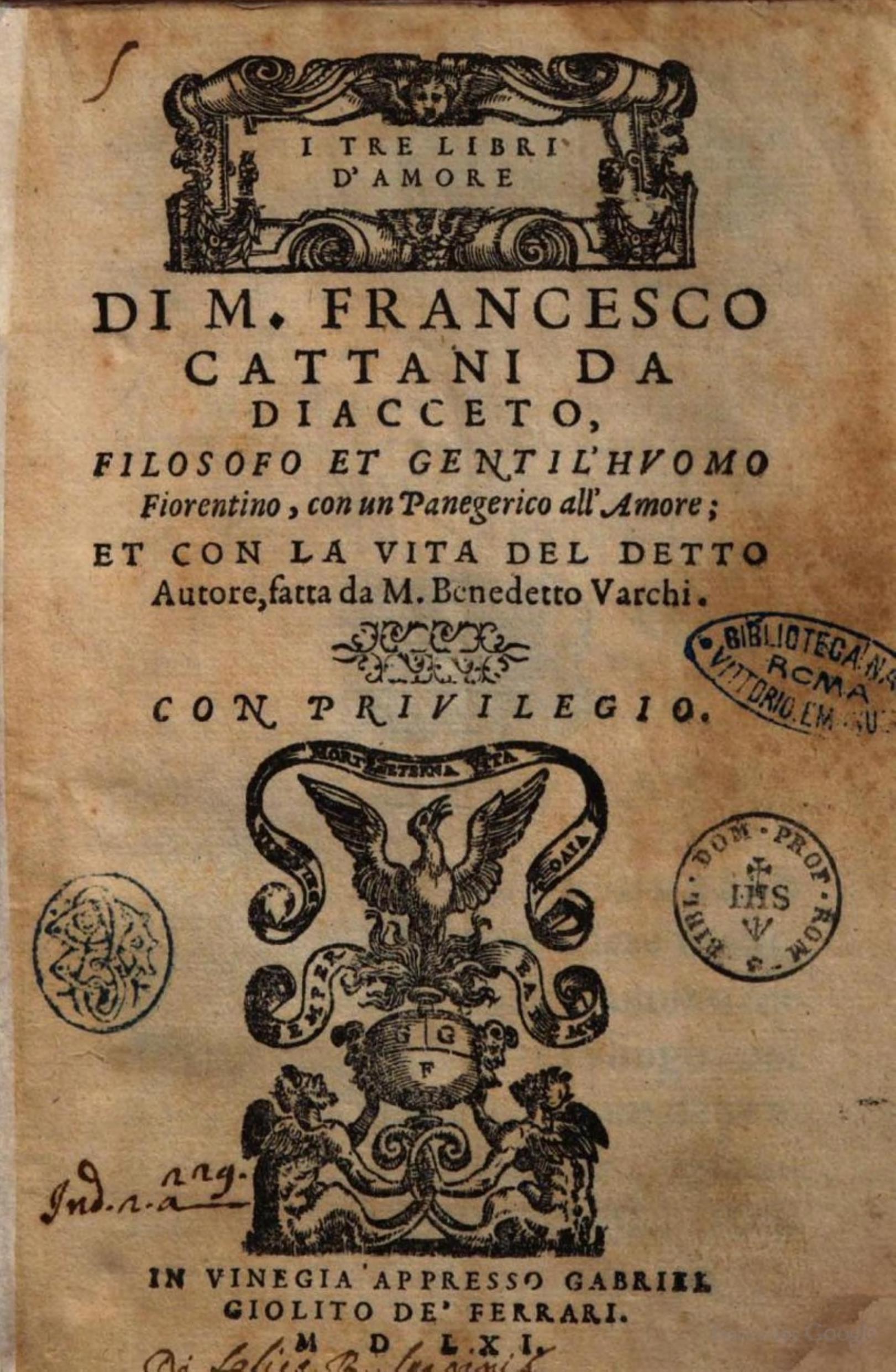
- Title-page of the Tre libri d'amore with a life of Diacceto by Benedetto Varchi, published in Venice, 1561
- Born: 16 November 1466; Florence
- Died: 10 April 1522 (aged 55); Florence
- Other name: Francesco di Zanobi Cattani da Diacceto
- Occupation: Philosopher

Francesco Cattani da Diacceto (16 November 1466 – 10 April 1522) was a Florentine Neoplatonist philosopher of the Italian Renaissance.

== Life ==
Diacceto was born in Florence on 16 November 1466, the son of Zanobi Cattani da Diacceto and Lionarda di Francesco di Iacopo Venturi. In his nineteenth year he married Lucretia di Cappone di Bartolomeo Capponi, with whom he had seven sons and six daughters. From 1491 to 1492 he studied philosophy under Oliviero Arduini at the University of Pisa. When he returned to Florence he became a disciple of Marsilio Ficino and a member of the intellectual group known as the Platonic Academy. He is sometimes considered Ficino's successor. Unlike Ficino, Diacceto tried to reconcile the philosophies of Aristotle and Plato. Also, he was not concerned with trying to Christianise Plato or Plotinus, so he provides a much clearer account of Neoplatonic magic and astrology; however, he appears to have been less interested in the subject than Ficino.

Diacceto died in Florence on 10 April 1522.

== Works ==
His grandson Francesco Cattani da Diacceto, bishop of Fiesole, attempted to collect and publish his works in both Latin and Italian, and commissioned Benedetto Varchi to write his biography. This was published together with the Tre libri d’amore e un panegirico all’amore of the elder Cattani in Venice in 1561.

The works of Diacceto, in the original Latin, are collected in the 1563 edition, Opera Omnia, edited by Theodor Zwinger and published in Basel.

De Pulchro, which is based on Plotinus, contains Diacceto's Neoplatonic theory of magical and astrological effects, in a chapter entitled: "The twofold soul, first and second, and its cognition likewise twofold, from which derives the appetite for beauty, and natural Magic: the nature of which he shows and which he differentiates from superstitious magic."
