= Jacob Anatoli =

Translator of Arabic texts to Hebrew

Jacob ben Abba Mari ben Simson Anatoli (c. 1194 – 1256) was a translator of Arabic texts to Hebrew. He was invited to Naples by Frederick II. Under this royal patronage, and in association with Michael Scot, Anatoli made Arabic learning accessible to Western readers. Among his most important works were translations of texts by Averroes.

== Early life and invitation to Naples ==
Born in southern France, perhaps in Marseille, Anatoli had an interest in literary activity that was stimulated early by his learned associates and relations at Narbonne and Béziers. He so distinguished himself that the emperor Frederick II, the most genial and enlightened monarch of the time, invited him to come to Naples. Under the emperor's patronage, Antatoli was enabled to devote himself to his studies. He translated scientific Arabic literature into the more accessible Hebrew language. Anatoli produced his most important literary and scientific translations while in Naples, and his works were copied under his name.

== Opposed by Anti-Maimonists ==
Anatoli was the son-in-law (and possibly also the brother-in-law) of Samuel ibn Tibbon, a well-known translator of Maimonides. Moses b. Samuel ibn Tibbon frequently refers to Anatoli as his uncle, which makes it likely that Samuel married Anatoli's sister. Anatoli later married Samuel's daughter. Because of this intimate connection with the ibn Tibbons, Anatoli was introduced to the philosophy of Maimonides. He found study of this man to be such a great revelation that he later referred to it as the beginning of his intelligent and true comprehension of the Scriptures. He also frequently alluded to Ibn Tibbon as one of the two masters who had instructed and inspired him. His esteem for Maimonides knew no bounds: he placed him next to the Prophets, and he exhibited little patience with Maimonides's critics and detractors.

He accordingly interprets the Bible and the Haggadah in a truly Maimonistic spirit, rationalizing the miracles and investing every possible passage in the ancient literature with philosophic and allegoric significance. As an allegorist who could read into the ancient documents the particular philosophical idiosyncrasies of his day, Anatoli deserves a place beside other allegoric and philosophical commentators, from Philo down; indeed, he may be regarded as a pioneer in the application of the Maimonistic manner to purposes of popular instruction. This work he began while still in his native land, on occasions of private and public festivities, such as weddings and other assemblies. Afterward he delivered Sabbath-afternoon sermons, in which he advocated the allegoric and philosophic method of Scriptural exegesis. This evoked the opposition of the anti-Maimonists, whose number was large in southern France; and probably Anatoli's departure for Sicily was hastened by the antagonism he encountered. But even at Naples Anatoli's views aroused the opposition of his Orthodox coreligionists. This treatment, together with several other unpleasant experiences at the royal court, seems to have caused him to entertain thoughts of suicide. He soon, however, recovered and wrote, for the benefit of his two sons, his Malmad ha-Talmidim, a name which, involving a play on words, was intended to be both a Teacher of the Disciples and a Goad to the Students.

The Malmad, which was completed when its author was fifty-five years old, but was first published by the Meḳiẓe Nirdamim Society at Lyck in the year 1866, is really nothing but a volume of sermons, by which the author intended to stimulate study and to dispel intellectual blindness. As a curious specimen of his method, it may be mentioned that he regards the three stories of Noah's Ark as symbolic of the three sciences mathematics, physics, and metaphysics. As such, the work is of some importance in the history of Jewish culture. Anatoli's ethical admonitions and spiritual meditations have value as portraying both the circumstances of the age and the character of the reforms he aimed at.

== Moral Fervor ==
Anatoli is quite plain-spoken in the manner in which he states and defends his views, as well as in his criticisms of contemporary failings. For instance, he does not hesitate to reproach the rabbis of his day for their general neglect not only of the thorough study, but even of the obligatory perusal, of the Bible, charging them with a preference for Talmudic dialectics. He, likewise, deplores the contemporary degeneracy in the home life and the religious practises of his people, a circumstance which he thinks due largely to the imitation of surrounding manners. Scientific investigation he insists upon as an absolute necessity for the true comprehension of religion, despite the fact that his contemporaries regarded all the hours which he was accustomed to spend with his father-in-law, Samuel ibn Tibbon, in mathematical and philosophic study as mere waste of time.

== The Malmad ==
The Malmad is divided into brief chapters, according to the weekly Scriptural portions. In it Anatoli manifests a wide acquaintance not only with the classic Jewish exegetes, but also with Plato, Aristotle, Averroes, and the Vulgate, as well as with a large number of Christian institutions, some of which he ventures to criticize, such as celibacy and monastic castigation, as well as certain heretics (compare 15a, 98a, 115a); and he repeatedly appeals to his readers for a broader cultivation of the classic languages and the profane branches of learning. He indignantly repudiates the fanatical view of some coreligionists that all non-Jews have no souls —a belief reciprocated by the Gentiles of the time. To Anatoli all men are, in truth, formed in the image of God, though the Jews stand under a particular obligation to further the true cognition of God simply by reason of their election—"the Greeks had chosen wisdom as their pursuit; the Romans, power; and the Jews, religiousness" (l.c. 103b). If, however, a non-Jew devotes himself to serious search after divine truth, his merit is so much the more significant; and whatever suggestion he may have to offer, no Jew dares refuse with levity.

== Anatoli and Michael Scot ==
An example of such intellectual catholicity was set by Anatoli himself; for, in the course of his "Malmad," he not only cites incidentally allegoric suggestions made to him by Frederick II., but several times—Güdemann has counted seventeen—he offers the exegetic remarks of a certain Christian savant of whose association he speaks most reverently, and whom, furthermore, he names as his second master besides Samuel ibn Tibbon. This Christian savant was identified by Senior Sachs as Michael Scot, who, like Anatoli, devoted himself to scientific work at the court of Frederick. Graetz even goes to the length of regarding Anatoli as identical with the Jew Andreas, who, according to Roger Bacon, assisted Michael Scot in his philosophic translations from the Arabic, seeing that Andreas might be a corruption of Anatoli. But Steinschneider will not admit the possibility of this conjecture, while Renan scarcely strengthens it by regarding "Andreas" as a possible northern corruption of "En Duran," which, he says, may have been the Provençal surname of Anatoli, since Anatoli, in reality, was but the name of his great-grandfather.

Anatoli's example of broad-minded study of Christian literature and intercourse with Christian scholars found many followers, as, for example, Moses ben Solomon of Salerno; and his work was an important factor in bringing the Jews of Italy into close contact with their Christian fellow students.

== Anatoli as translator ==
The "Malmad," owing to its deep ethical vein, became, despite its Maimonistic heresies, a very popular book. It is rather as a translator that Anatoli deserves a distinguished place in the scientific realm; for it is he and Michael Scot who together, under the influence of Frederick II, opened to the western world the treasure-house of Arabic learning. Anatoli, in fact, was the first man to translate the commentaries of Averroes into Hebrew, thus opening a new era in the history of Aristotelian philosophy. Prior to translating Averroes' commentaries, Anatoli had occupied himself with the translation of astronomical treatises by the same writer and others; but at the instance of friends he turned his attention to logic and the speculative works, realizing and recommending the importance of logic, in particular, in view of the contemporary religious controversies. Thenceforth, his program was twofold, as he devoted himself to his work in astronomy in the mornings, and to logic in the evenings.

His principal translation embraced the first five books of Averroes' "intermediate" commentary on Aristotle's Logic, consisting of the Introduction of Porphyry and the four books of Aristotle on the Categories, Interpretation, Syllogism, and Demonstration. Anatoli probably commenced his work on the commentary while in Provence, though he must have finished the fifth book at Naples about 1231 or 1232. The conclusion of the commentary was never reached. Upon the ending of the first division he desired to go over the ground again, to acquire greater proficiency, and, for some reason unknown, he never resumed his task, which was completed by another after a lapse of eighty years.

Besides this, Anatoli translated, between the years 1231 and 1235, the following works: (1) The Almagest of Ptolemy, from the Arabic, though probably the Greek or Latin title of this treatise was also familiar to him. Its Hebrew title is Ḥibbur ha-Gadol ha-Niḳra al-Magesti (The Great Composition Called Almagest). (2) A Compendium of Astronomy, by Averroes, a book which was unknown to the Christians of the Middle Ages, and of which neither a manuscript of the original nor a Latin translation has come down. Its Hebrew title is Ḳiẓẓur al-Magesti (Compendium of the Almagest). (3) The Elements of Astronomy, by Al-Fargani (Alfraganus); possibly translated from a Latin version. It was afterward rendered into Latin by Jacob Christmann (Frankfort, 1590) under the title of Elementa Astronomica, which, in its turn, may have given rise to the Hebrew title of the treatise Yesodot ha-Teḳunah, which is undoubtedly recent. (4) A treatise on the Syllogism, by Al-Farabi, from the Arabic. Its Hebrew title is Sefer Heḳesh Ḳaẓar (A Brief Treatise on the Syllogism).

Graetz also suggests the possibility that Anatoli, in conjunction with Michael Scot, may have translated Maimonides' Guide for the Perplexed into Latin; but this suggestion has not yet been sufficiently proved (compare Steinschneider, "Hebr. Uebers." i. 433). Similarly, the anonymous commentary on the Guide, called Ruaḥ Ḥen, though sometimes attributed to Anatoli, can not definitely be established as his. Still, it is on an allusion in this work that Zunz, followed by Steinschneider, partly bases the hypothesis of Marseille having been Anatoli's original home (compare Zunz, "Zur Gesch." p. 482; Renan-Neubauer, "Les Rabbins Français," p. 588; Steinschneider, "Cat. Bodl." col. 1180, and "Hebr. Bibl." xvii. 124).
