= Judah ben Eleazar Kron =

Russian Jewish educator and writer (1793–1831)

- Born: February 1, 1793; Tuckum, Courland, Polish–Lithuanian Commonwealth
- Died: 1831 (aged 37–38); Mitau, Courland Governorate, Russian Empire
- Occupations: Educator; writer

Judah ben Eleazar Kron (Hebrew: יהודה בן אליעזר קרון; February 1, 1793 – 1831) was a Russian Jewish educator and writer.

== Biography ==
Judah ben Eleazar Kron was born in Tuckum, Courland, where his father was a merchant. He received his education under the guidance of Rabbis J. W. Blumenfeld and M. Ezekiel, as well as at the district school in his hometown.

Kron spent his career as an educator in Mitau. In 1826, he passed an examination as an authorized translator of the Hebrew language before a school commission at the University of Dorpat. In the same year, he was appointed as a translator to the city magistrate of Mitau.

Kron's works include Derekh Selulah (Vilna, 1826), a Hebrew-German dictionary; Betrachtungen über die Welt (Riga, 1829), a German translation of Bedersi's Beḥinat ha-Olam; and Reshit ha-Limmud (Vilna, 1880), a comprehensive study on the Hebrew alphabet.

He died from cholera in 1831.
