= Merwan ha-Levi =

French philanthropist

Merwan ha-Levi was one of the most prominent Jews of Narbonne in the second half of the 11th century. One source mentions that his name may have also been Shmuel, or a relative or his father may have been named Shmuel, and that further investigation is required regarding this matter. Another source speculates that the name Merwan reflects a misspelling of Maran (or a form of it), meaning master.

He was a philanthropist, who devoted his time and fortune to that community. It seems that he was also in favor with the government, being thus enabled to check unfavorable measures against the Jews. He was the head of a family which produced several famous Jewish scholars, among whom were his son, Rabbi Isaac of Narbonne, and his grandson, Nasi Moses ben Joseph of Narbonne.
