= Caslari family =

Jewish family originally from Caylar

Caslari is the name of a Jewish family originally from Caylar (Latin, "Castalarium"), a village in the department of Hérault, France. An important Jewish community existed at Caylar in the Middle Ages. After the royal edict of 17 September 1394, these Jews went to Provence and to the Comtat-Venaissin; in 1459 and 1487 some of them were at Tarascon, and in 1480 at Avignon. The Caslari family enjoyed a considerable reputation as late as the second half of the sixteenth century. It produced the following scholars:

== David Caslari ==
Also called Bongodas, and entitled "Maestro", he was a physician at Narbonne, and one of the Jews to whom the archbishop, in 1284, granted a number of privileges. The poet Abraham Bedersi, who was an intimate friend of Caslari, addressed to him a liturgic poem at the feast of Purim, and proposed him, together with Abraham Saquil, Asher ha-Kohen, and Moses ben Judah Mansuri, as a judge of the literary contest to which he had invited the Jewish poets. David translated from Latin into Hebrew Galen's treatise, "De Inæquali Intemperie".

== David ben Vadi Caslari ==
He lived at Perpignan about 1337. He was probably not closely related to David Caslari. His signature appears on the bill of divorce which the scholar David Bongoron was obliged to give (1337) to his wife, the daughter of the rich En Astruc Caravida of Girone (Henri Gross, Gallia Judaica, p. 469).

== En Bongodah or Bonjuda Yehacel Caslari ==
He was a poet. He and his son Yehacel (Ezekiel), about 1400, exchanged poems with Solomon ben Reuben Bonfed, which are still extant in the manuscripts of Bonfed's diwan.

== Mossé du Caylar or Caslari ==
He was warden of the community at Avignon in 1480, together with Vital Dieu, Lo Sal of Carcassonne, Mossé of Softal, Isaac of Sant Pal (St. Paul), Isaac Boterel, and Mossé Ferrusol.

== Tzemach ben Jedidiah ==
Called Crescas of Caslari, he copied in 1525 the Paris manuscript (No. 179) containing the commentary of Abraham ibn Ezra on the Pentateuch

== Tzemach ben Moises Caslari ==
He was rabbi at Carpentras about 1583. His signature appears on a document confirmed at Carpentras Adar 7, 5343 (1583AD), in addition to the names of Moses, son of Judah Rouget, and Moses, son of Joseph Kolon.

== See also ==
- Hachmei Provence
