= Moses ibn Tibbon =

Provençal Jewish philosopher and physician (f. 1240–1283)

Moses ibn Tibbon (born in Marseille; flourished between 1240 and 1283) was a Jewish physician, author and translator in Provence. The number of works written by Moses ibn Tibbon suggest that he reached a great age.

He was the son of Samuel ibn Tibbon, a Jewish scholar and doctor who translated Maimonides into Hebrew.

Moses married and was the father of Judah ibn Tibbon, who was prominent in the Maimonidean controversy which took place at Montpellier, southern France. With other Jewish physicians of Provence, Moses was restricted by the order of the Council of Béziers (May 1246), which prohibited Jewish physicians from treating Gentiles.

== Works (original) ==
He wrote the following works:

- Commentary on Shir HaShirim (Lyck, 1874). Written under the influence of Maimonides, it is of a philosophical and allegorical character, and is similar to that by his brother-in-law Abba Mari ben Simson ben Anatoli, whom he quotes repeatedly.
- Commentary to the Pentateuch. Judah Mosconi (c. 1370), in his supercommentary on the writings of Abraham ibn Ezra, expresses some doubt as to the authenticity of this commentary because of its often very unsatisfactory explanations. According to Steinschneider, it was a supercommentary on Abraham ibn Ezra.
- Sefer Pe'ah, an allegorical explanation of haggadic passages in the Talmud and the Midrash (Neubauer, "Cat. Bodl. Hebr. MSS." No. 939, 9).
- Commentary on the weights and measures of the Bible and the Talmud (Vatican MSS., No. 298, 4; see Assemani, "Catal." p. 283; Steinschneider, "Joseph ibn Aḳnin", in Ersch and Gruber, "Encyc." section ii., part 31, p. 50; "Ginze Nistarot", iii. 185 et seq.).
- Sefer ha-Tanninim, mentioned by Isaac de Lattes (l.c.), but without indication of its contents.
- Letter on questions raised by his father, Samuel ibn Tibbon, in regard to Maimonides' Moreh Nebukim (Guide for the Perplexed) (Neubauer, "Cat. Bodl. Hebr. MSS." No. 2218, 2).

== Translations ==
Moses ibn Tibbon's translations are considered more important than and outnumber his original works. They include versions of works written in Arabic by Arabs and Jews on philosophy, mathematics, astronomy, and medicine. In the following list, the name of the author of the original work precedes the title by which the translation is known.

Moses' most important translations are as follows:

- Averroes: Commentaries, etc., on Aristotle: Physica Auscultatio (about 1250; Steinschneider, "Hebr. Uebers." p. 109); Kelale ha-Shamayim weha-'Olam (De Cœlo et Mundo; l.c. p. 126); Sefer ha-Hawayah weha-Hefsed (1250: De Generatione et Corruptione; l.c. p. 130); Sefer Otot 'Elyonot (Meteora; l.c. p. 135); Kelale Sefer ha-Nefesh (1244: De Anima; l.c. p. 147); Bi'ur Sefer ha-Nefesh (1261: The Middle Commentary; l.c. p. 148); Ha-Hush we-ha-Muḥash (1254: Parva Naturalia; l.c. p. 154); Mah she-Aḥar ha-Ṭeba' , (1258: Metaphysica; l.c. p. 159); Bi'ur Arguza (commentary on Avicenna's "Arjuzah"; Renan, "Averroes," p. 189; Steinschneider, l.c. p. 699).
- Avicenna: Ha-Seder ha-Ḳaṭon (1272: "The Small Canon"; l.c. p. 693, comp. p. 285).
- Batalyusi: Ha-'Agullot ha-Ra'yoniyyot (Al-Ḥada'iḳ, on the "similarity of the world to an imaginary sphere"; l.c. p. 287), edited by D. Kaufmann ('Die Spuren al-Bataljusi's in der Jüdischen Religionsphilosophie," Leipsic, 1880).
- Al-Hassar: Sefer ha-Ḥeshbon (1271: Treatise on Arithmetic; Steinschneider, l.c. p. 558; "Isr. Letterbode," iii. 8).
- Euclid: Shorashim, or Yesodot (1270: Elements; Steinschneider, l.c. p. 506, comp. p. 510).
- Alfarabi: Hatḥalot ha-Nimẓa'ot ha-Tib'iyyim (1248: Book of the Principles; l.c. p. 291. comp. p. 47), edited by H. Fillpowski, in a Hebrew almanac of 5610 (Leipsic, 1849).
- Geminus: Ḥokmat ha-Kokabim, or Ḥokmat Tekunah (1246, Naples: Introduction to the Almagest of Ptolemy; l.c. p. 539).
- Ibn Al-Jazzar: Ẓedat ha-Derakim (1259. Viaticum)
- Hunain: Mabo el Meleket ha-Refu'ah (Introduction to Medical Science; l.c. p. 711).
- Razi: Ha-Ḥilluḳ weha-Ḥilluf (Book of the Classifications [of Diseases]; l.c. p. 730); Al Iḳrabadhin (Antidotarium; l.c. p. 730).

For his other translations see Steinschneider, l.c. pp. 177, 231, 362, 363, 416, 542, 544, 553; idem, "Cat. Bodl." cols. 1998 et seq.

== Translations from Maimonides ==
True to the traditions of his family, Moses ibn Tibbon translated Arabic writings by Maimonides which his father had not addressed:

- "Miktab" or "Ma'amar be-Hanhagat ha-Beri'ut," a treatise on hygiene in the form of a letter to the sultan, printed in Kerem Ḥemed (iii. 9 et seq.), in Jacob ben Moses Zebi's "Dibre Mosheh" (Warsaw, 1886), and by Jacob Saphir ha-Levi (Jerusalem, 1885, from his own manuscript, under the title "Sefer Hanhagat ha-Beri'ut"). This translation (1244) was one of his first, if not the first (Steinschneider, "Hebr. Uebers." pp. 770 et seq.).
- Commentary on the Mishnah. A fragment of his translation of Pe'ah, which was published by A. Geiger 1847, suggests that he may have translated the whole Seder Mo'ed (l.c. p. 925).
- Sefer ha-Mitzvot another of his earliest translations (Constantinople, c. 1516–18, also printed in various editions of Maimonides' "Yad," but without Moses ibn Tibbon's preface). In his preface he justifies continuing his own translation, though having known of that of Abraham Ḥasdai, on the grounds that the latter had obviously used the first edition of the Arabic original, while he used a later revision (l.c. p. 927).
- Millot ha-Higgayon, a treatise on logic (Venice, 1552, with two anonymous commentaries). No complete manuscript of the Arabic original is known. The terminology used by Moses ibn Tibbon has been adopted throughout Hebrew philosophical literature (l.c. p. 434). This is among collected works of Maimonides held by the National Library of Israel, and images of the manuscript are online.
- Ha-Ma'amar ha-Nikbad, a treatise on poisons, also called Ha-Ma'amar be-Teri'aḳ (extant in several manuscripts; see Steinschneider, "Cat. Bodl." col. 1919, iv.; Moritz Steinschneider, Die Hebräischen Übersetzungen des Mittelalters und die Juden als Dolmetscher. Berlin, 1893, p. 764).
- Commentary on Hippocrates' "Aphorisms" (1257 or 1267: l.c. p. 769, comp. p. 659).

== See also ==
- Ibn Tibbon, a family list.
- Hachmei Provence
