= Ibn Zuhr =

Muslim physician, surgeon and poet (1094–1162)

Ibn Zuhr ابن زهر Avenzoar
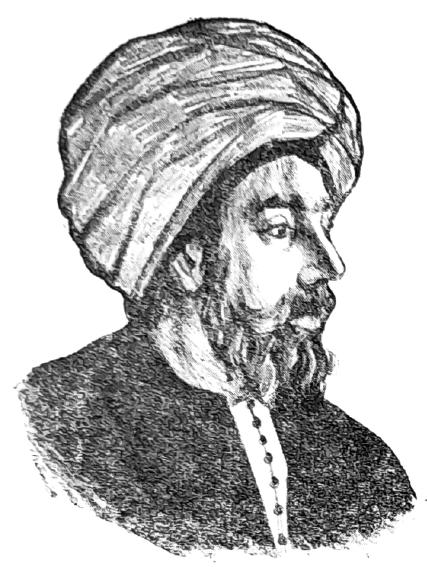
- An imaginary sketch representing Muslim physician Ibn Zuhr.
- Born: 1094; Peñaflor, Almoravid empire, now Province of Seville, Spain
- Died: 1162 (aged 68); Seville, Almohad empire, now Province of Seville, Spain

Academic background
- Influences: Abu al-'Ala' (father); Galen

Academic work
- Era: Medieval Islamic civilization
- Notable works: Kitab al-Taisir fi al-Mudawat wa al-Tadbir
- Influenced: Averroes, Maimonides, Pietro d'Abano, Guy de Chauliac

Abū Marwān ‘Abd al-Malik ibn Zuhr (Arabic: أبو مروان عبد الملك بن زهر), traditionally known by his Latinized name Avenzoar (Note: Also Abumeron, Abhomeron, Alomehَn or Abhomjeron.) (/ˌɑːvənˈzoʊər/; 1094–1162), was an Arab physician, surgeon, and poet. He was born at Seville in medieval Andalusia (present-day Spain), was a contemporary of Averroes and Ibn Tufail, and was the most well-regarded physician of his era. He was particularly known for his emphasis on a more rational, empiric basis of medicine. His major work, Al-Taysīr fil-Mudāwāt wal-Tadbīr ("Book of Simplification Concerning Therapeutics and Diet"), was translated into Latin and Hebrew and was influential to the progress of surgery. He also improved surgical and medical knowledge by keying out several diseases and their treatments.

Ibn Zuhr performed the first experimental tracheotomy on a goat. He is thought to have made the earliest description of bezoar stones as medicinal items.

== Biography ==
Avenzoar was born in Seville in 1094, to the notable Banu Zuhr family who were members of the Arab tribe of Iyad. Starting in the early 10th century, the family produced six consecutive generations of physicians, as well as jurists, poets, viziers or courtiers, and midwives who served under the rulers of al-Andalus. Avenzoar started his education by studying religion and literature, as was the custom in medieval Muslim socialites. He later studied medicine with his father, Abu'l-Ala Zuhr (d.1131) at an early age. According to Avenzoar himself, his father introduced him to the works of Galen and Hippocrates, and asked him to swear the Hippocratic Oath while still a youth.

Avenzoar started his medical career as court physician for the Almoravid empire. However, for some undisclosed reason, he later fell out of favour with the Almoravid ruler, 'Ali bin Yusuf bin Tashufin, and fled from Seville. He was however, apprehended and jailed in Marrakesh in 1140. This experience left a bad resentment in him as alluded from his writing. Later in 1147 when the Almohad empire conquered Seville, he returned and devoted himself to medical practice. He died in Seville in 1162.

According to Leo Africanus, ibn Zuhr heard Averroes lecture, and learned physics from him. He was a great admirer of Galen, and in his writings he protests emphatically against quackery and the superstitious remedies of astrologers.

== Works ==
=== Kitab al-Iqtisad ===
"The book of moderation," this was a treatise on general therapy written in his youth for the Almoravid prince Ibrahim Yusuf ibn Tashfin. The book is a summary of various different diseases, therapeutics and general hygiene. It is also noted for its advice regarding cosmetics and physical beauty. Ibn Zuhr even recommended plastic surgery to alter acquired features such as big noses, thick lips or crooked teeth.

=== Kitab al-Aghdhiya ===
The book of foods, as its name indicates, is a manual on foods and regimen which contains guidelines for a healthy life. Ibn Zuhr wrote the book shortly after he went out of jail for his new patron, Almohad leader Abd al-Mu'min. The book contains classification of different kinds of dishes and foods like bread, meat, beverages, fruits and sweets. When he talks about the meat, Ibn Zuhr mentions different kinds of animals' fleshes, even unusual ones like those of gazelles, lions and snakes, classifying them based on their taste, usefulness and digestibility. He also recommends specific foods for each season of the year. For example, during winter, digestion is accelerated, so the amount of food consumed should also be increased. Moreover, the food should also be warmer and drier, as temperatures are lower and humidity is higher.

=== Kitab al-Taysir ===
Kitab al-Taysir seems to be the last book of Ibn Zuhr before his death. As mentioned in the introduction, the book was authored at the request of his friend, Averroes, to act as a compendium to his medical encyclopedia Colliget which focused more on general topics of medicine. The two books were later translated into Hebrew and Latin, where they used to be printed as a single book and remained popular as late as the 18th century.

The book, which contains 30 chapters, provides clinical descriptions and diagnosis of diseases starting from the head. Ibn Zuhr provided an accurate description of the esophageal, stomach and mediastinal cancers, as well as other lesions. He proposed feeding enemas to keep alive patients with stomach cancer. He was also the first to give pathological descriptions of inflammations like otitis media and pericarditis.

Perhaps Ibn Zuhr's greatest contribution to medicine was his application of experimental method by introducing animal testing. He is known to have performed medical procedures on animals before doing them on humans to know if they would work. Most notable was his approval and recommendation for the surgical procedure of tracheotomy, which was a controversial procedure at the time. In trying to sort out the controversy, Ibn Zuhr described the following medical experiment which he performed on a goat:

"Earlier on in my training when I read those opinions (controversies), I cut on the lung pipe of a goat after incising the skin and the covering sheath underneath. Then I completely cut off the substance of the pipe, an area just less than the size of a tirmisah (lupine seed). Then, I kept washing the wound with water and honey till it healed and it (the animal) totally recovered and lived for a long time."

=== Other works ===
Ibn Abi Usaibia mentions these other works of Ibn Zuhr:

- Fi al-Zinah (On Beatification).
- Al-Tiryaq al-Sabini (On Antidotes).
- Fi Illat al-Kila (On Diseases of the Kidney).
- Fi Illat al-Baras wa al-Bahaq (On Leprosy and Vitiligo).
- Al-Tadhkirah (The Remembrance).

== Legacy ==
The Jewish physician-philosopher Maimonides admired Ibn Zuhr, describing him as "unique in his age and one of the great sages". He frequently quoted him in his medical texts. Averroes praised him as the greatest physician since Galen. Both his daughter and granddaughter also became physicians, specializing in obstetrics.

== See also ==
- Islamic medicine
- List of Muslim scientists
- List of Arab scientists and scholars

== Sources ==
- Azar, Henry (2008). The Sage of Seville: Ibn Zuhr, His Time, and His Medical Legacy. Cairo: American University in Cairo. ISBN 978-9774161551.
- Millán, Cristina Álvarez (2005). "Ibn Zuhr". In Glick, Thomas F.; Livesey, Steven John; Wallis, Faith (eds.). Medieval Science, Technology, and Medicine: An Encyclopedia. Routledge encyclopedias of the Middle Ages; v. 11. New York: Routledge. ISBN 0415969301.
