= Samuel ibn Tibbon =

Provençal Jewish philosopher and physician (c. 1150–1230)

Samuel ben Judah ibn Tibbon (c. 1150 – c. 1230), more commonly known as Samuel ibn Tibbon (Hebrew: שמואל בן יהודה אבן תבון, Arabic: ابن تبّون), was a Jewish philosopher and doctor who lived and worked in Provence, later part of France. He was born about 1150 in Lunel (Languedoc), and died about 1230 in Marseille. He is best known for his translations of Jewish rabbinic literature from Arabic to Hebrew. Samuel ibn Tibbon wrote his own philosophical works, including "Sefer ha-Mikhtav" (The Book of the Letter), which dealt with ethics and spirituality. Samuel ibn Tibbon's translations and commentaries had a significant impact on Jewish thought and scholarship during the Middle Ages. They helped to disseminate the ideas of Greek philosophy and Islamic science throughout the Jewish world, and they also contributed to the development of Jewish philosophy in their own right.

== Biography ==
He received a Jewish education in rabbinic literature from his father Judah ben Saul ibn Tibbon. Other teachers in Lunel taught him about medicine, Arabic and the secular knowledge of his age.

Samuel ibn Tibbon married and had children, including a son, Moses ibn Tibbon, who also translated works from Arabic to Hebrew. Later in his life, he lived in several cities of southern France (1199 in Béziers, and 1204 in Arles).

He traveled to Barcelona, Toledo, and Alexandria (1210–1213). Finally he settled in Marseille. After his death, his body was transported to the Kingdom of Jerusalem, and he is buried in Tiberias.

== Original writings ==
In 1213, while returning from Alexandria, Samuel ibn Tibbon wrote on shipboard Biur meha-Millot ha-Zarot, an explanation of the philosophical terms of Guide for the Perplexed by Maimonides.

When finishing his Hebrew translation of the Guide (originally written in Arabic), Samuel wrote an alphabetical glossary of the foreign words that he had used in his translation. In the introduction to the glossary, he divided these words into five classes:

1. Words taken mainly from the Arabic;
2. Rare words occurring in the Mishnah and in the Gemara;
3. Hebrew verbs and adjectives derived from substantives by analogy with the Arabic;
4. Homonyms, used with special meanings; and
5. Words to which new meanings were given by analogy with the Arabic.

He gives also a list of corrections which he desired to be made in the copies of his translation of the Guide. The glossary gives not only a short explanation of each word and its origin, but also in many cases a scientific definition with examples.

Samuel wrote a commentary on the whole Bible, but only the following portions are known:

- Ma'amar Yikkawu ha-Mayim, a philosophical treatise in twenty-two chapters on Gen. i. 9. It deals with physical and metaphysical subjects, interpreting in an allegoric-philosophical manner the Bible verses cited by the author. At the end of the treatise, the author says that he wrote it in response to the propagation of philosophy among Gentiles and the ignorance of his coreligionists in philosophical matters.
- A philosophical commentary on Ecclesiastes, quoted by Samuel in the foregoing work (p. 175), and of which several manuscripts are extant.
- A commentary on the Song of Solomon. Quotations from this work are found in his commentary on Ecclesiastes; in Neubauer, "Cat. Bodl. Hebr. MSS." No. 1649, 2, fol. 21; and in his son's commentary on the Song of Solomon. These make it evident that Samuel wrote this commentary, but its full contents are unknown.

Samuel ibn Tibbon was an enthusiastic adherent of Maimonides and his allegorical interpretation of the Bible. He held that many Bible narratives are to be considered simply as parables (meshalim) and the religious laws as guides (hanhagot) to a higher, spiritual life. While such statements were not unusual in his age, adherents of the literal interpretation of the Bible, the anti-Maimonidean party (see Maimonides for more details), created strong opposition to the work.

== Translations ==
Samuel's reputation is based not on his original writings, but on his translations, especially that of Maimonides' Guide for the Perplexed in 1204. (An image of his work may be seen online at the World Digital Library.) (The Hebrew translation is Moreh Nevukhim). Opponents of Maimonides used a satirical title: Nevukhat ha-Morim, or "Perplexity of the Rebellious".

Before finishing this difficult work, Samuel consulted Maimonides several times by letter regarding some difficult passages. Maimonides responded sometimes in Arabic; his letters were later translated into Hebrew, perhaps by Samuel. He praised the translator's ability and acknowledged his command of Arabic, a skill he found surprising in France. Maimonides gave some general rules for translation from the Arabic into Hebrew, and explained passages questioned by Samuel by writing in Hebrew.

Samuel ibn Tibbon's translation is preceded by an introduction. He said that he wrote the translation because the Jewish scholars of Lunel had asked for it. As aids in his work, he used the Hebrew translation by his father (whom he calls "the Father of the Translators"), works on the Arabic language, and the Arabic writings in his own library. Samuel also prepared an index of the Biblical verses quoted in the Moreh.

A new, modern edition of ibn Tibbon's translation was published in 2019 by Feldheim Publishers. Punctuation and paragraph breaks were added, as well as translation of difficult words at the bottom of the page. There is also an extended introduction, many new indexes and other additions.

== Characteristics of his works ==
The distinction of Samuel's translation is its accuracy and faithfulness to the original. Some critics have been concerned that he introduced a number of Arabic words into Hebrew, and, by analogy with the Arabic, he gives to certain Hebrew words meanings different from the accepted ones. But generally the scope and success of his work are not questioned. Especially admirable is the skill with which he reproduces in Hebrew the abstract ideas of Maimonides, as Hebrew is essentially a language of a people expressing concrete ideas.

When the struggle between the Maimonists and anti-Maimonists arose, Samuel was reproached for contributing to the spread of the ideas of Maimonides. His chief critic was Judah al-Fakhkhar.

Samuel translated the following works of Maimonides:

1. A treatise on Resurrection under the Hebrew title "Iggeret" or "Ma'amar Tehhiyath ha-Metim";
2. Mishnah commentary on Pirkei Avoth, including the psychological introduction, entitled "Shemonah Perakim" (the Eight Chapters);
3. Maimonides' "Thirteen articles of faith" (originally part of his Mishnah commentary on tractate Sanhedrin, 10th chapter)
4. A letter to his pupil Joseph ibn 'Aḳnin

Samuel also translated the following works of other Arabic authors:

1. 'Ali ibn Ridwan's commentary on the Ars Parva of Galen (according to Paris MS. 1114), finished in 1199 in Béziers
2. Three smaller treatises of Averroes, under the title "Sheloshah Ma'amarim" (edited by J. Herez, with German translation: "Drei Abhandlungen über die Conjunction des Separaten Intellects mit den Menschen von Averroes, aus dem Arabischen Uebersetzt von Samuel ibn Tibbon," Berlin, 1869). Samuel translated these three treatises both as an appendix to his commentary on Ecclesiastes (see above) and separately (Steinschneider, ibid p. 199).
3. Yahya ibn al-Batriq's Arabic translation of Aristotle's Meteora, under the title "Otot ha-Shamayim" (also quoted under the title "Otot 'Elyonot"), translated on a voyage from Alexandria, between the two islands Lampedusa and Pantellaria. It is extant in several manuscripts. The preface and the beginning of the text have been printed by Filipowski (c. 1860) as a specimen. Samuel made this retranslation, at the request of Joseph ben Israel of Toledo, working from a single and bad Arabic translation of Batriq (Steinschneider, ibid p. 132.).

== See also ==
- Ibn Tibbon, a family list
- Hachmei Provence
