= Judah ben Solomon ha-Kohen =

Spanish Jewish philosopher (c. 1215–c. 1274)

Judah ben Solomon ha-Kohen (ibn Matkah (Note: Judah ben Solomon ha-Kohen is listed in some books by the name ben Matkah or Ibn Matkah. The name is only found in one manuscript of the Midrash ha-Ḥokmah, dating to the 16th century, although it was also used by Joseph ben David ha-Yevani in the 13th century. and by the anonymous 14th-century author of MS Mich. Add. 21 f. 10r (Sachs, Senior (1850). Ha-Palit (in Hebrew) pp. 51-52). Senior Sachs supposes that it may be a nickname for a grandfather named "Moses" (Ibid.), but Yitzhak Baer connects it to a toponym "Mosca" near Toledo. Judah Halevi quotes the poet Abu Omar bin Matka, Maimonides writes of "the old man Ibn Matka", and Yhuda ben Mosca el minor lived in 13th-century Toledo. Baer, Fritz (1936). Die Juden im christlichen Spanien (in German). pp. 58-60.)) (Hebrew: יְהוּדָה בְּן שְׁלֹמֹה הכֹּהֵן (אִבְּן מתקה); c. 1215–c. 1274) was a thirteenth-century Spanish Jewish philosopher, astronomer, and mathematician. He was the author of the Midrash ha-Ḥokmah, considered the first of the great Hebrew encyclopedias, and notable for its in-depth treatment both of the exact sciences and of biblical and rabbinic texts.

Judah ben Solomon was born and educated in Toledo. We know that his maternal grandfather's name was Ziza ibn Shushan. He was a pupil of Meir Abulafia, who induced him to study philosophy and Jewish mysticism.

At the age of eighteen he entered into correspondence with the philosophers at the court of Emperor Frederick II. The emperor himself consulted him about scientific matters, and his answers proved so satisfactory that he was invited in 1247 to settle in Tuscany, where he had free access to the imperial court. There he translated into Hebrew his major work, an encyclopedia entitled Midrash ha-Ḥokmah, which he had originally written in Arabic.

Midrash ha-Ḥokmah is divided into two parts. The first provides a survey of Aristotelian logic, physics, and metaphysics, and contains, besides, a treatise on certain passages in Genesis, Psalms, and Proverbs. The second part is devoted to mathematics, and contains, also, two treatises: the first, a mystical one on the letters of the alphabet; the other, a collection of Biblical passages to be interpreted philosophically. It also includes adaptation of Ptolemy's Almagest, which he arranged in eight chapters, and of his Quadripartitum under the Hebrew title Mishpeṭe ha-Kokabim, a treatise on astrology, and an adaptation of Al-Bitruji's astronomy, under the title Miklal Yofi. While he appreciates the writing of Averroes on Aristotelianism, he is not an Averroist.
