= Abraham ben Nathan =

12th/13th-century Provençal rabbi and scholar

Abraham ben Nathan (Hebrew: אברהם בן נתן) was a Provençal rabbi and scholar of the 12th–13th centuries.

== Biography ==
Abraham was born in the second half of the 12th century, probably at Lunel, Languedoc, where he also received his education. For this reason, he is sometimes also called HaYarḥi (הירחי) or Ibn Jarḥi (אבן ירחי), 'of Lunel', since the letters for "Ibn" in Hebrew, אבן, is an acrostic for Abraham's initials. Additionally, the Hebrew yareaḥ is the equivalent of the French word lune ('moon')

In Lunel, Abraham may have studied under Abraham ben David, but his regular rabbinical studies, were pursued at Dampierre, Aube in northern France at the academy of Isaac ben Samuel. Abraham subsequently left his birthplace, and, after much traveling, finally settled in Toledo, Spain in 1204, where his learning quickly gained for him the favor of the rich and learned Joseph ibn Shushan and that of his sons, Solomon and Isaac. To these patrons he dedicated his seminal work, Sefer Ha-Manhig (The Guide), or as the author called it, Manhig 'Olam, which he began in 1204 and completed some years later. In its present form the book consists of two distinct portions, the first of which comprises a collection of responsa, compiled from his numerous written and oral decisions, some of the former of which still bear the usual epistolary conclusion: "Shalom! A. B. N." (Greeting! Abraham ben Nathan). The second part contains extracts from the halakhic works of Isaac Alfasi, Isaac ibn Ghiyyat and Isaac ben Abba Mari, a relative of Abraham's.

The Manhig did not exert any important influence on halakhic literature and is only occasionally mentioned by rabbis of the Middle Ages. However, it must be considered as of some importance in the history of Jewish literature, for it contains numerous literal quotations from the two Talmuds and most of the halakhic and aggadic Midrashim, as well as from certain collections of aggadot which have been wholly lost; so that the Manhig contributes considerably to the textual criticism of all of those works. It gives interesting and instructive details concerning special synagogical usages, personally observed by the author in northern France, southwestern Germany, Burgundy, Champagne, Provence, England, and Spain, and for which there is no other source of information. Thus, he tells us that it was the custom in France for children to bring their Christian nurses to the courtyard of the synagogue on Purim, where their parents and relatives loaded them with gifts. He relates also that this custom was strongly objected to by many, because the Jewish poor were losers thereby, and Rashi is said especially to have denounced it.

Abraham is said also to have written a work entitled Maḥaziḳ haBedeḳ, upon the ritual for slaughtering animals for food, mention of which, however, is made by but one writer in 1467. Renan was mistaken in saying that this work is mentioned in HaManhig, for the words sifri maḥaziq habedeq refer, as may be seen from page 2b, line 6, to the HaManhig, which was designed to counteract any schism in matters of ritual. Abraham Zacuto who is followed by David Conforte, ascribes (without giving his authority) a certain book entitled Maḥaziḳ haBedeḳ to Abraham ben Nathan. But Reifmann's assertion that RABN was the author of a work entitled Beit Zevul (Habitation) is wholly unwarranted; for these two words, occurring in the introduction to HaManhig, refer to the HaManhig itself, as is evident from the passage on page 2, line 6.

RABN wrote also a commentary on the tractate Kallah, which is extant in fragmentary form only; specimens of it were given in the Hebrew weekly HaMaggid.

During his long stay in Spain, Abraham learned Arabic sufficiently to translate into Hebrew a responsum by Saadia Gaon, which is to be found in the HaManhig. His responsa were also published in Wertheimer's Ginzei Yerushalayim, 1896.
