= On the Harmony of Religions and Philosophy =

Book by Averroes

- Author: Ibn Rushd
- Original title: فصل المقال في ما بين الحكمة و الشريعة من إتصال

Fasl al-Maqal fi ma bayn al-Hikma wa al-Shariah min Ittisal (Arabic: فصل المقال في ما بين الحكمة و الشريعة من إتصال often translated as On the Harmony of Religions and Philosophy or The Decisive Treatise, Determining the Nature of the Connection between Religion and Philosophy, with the latter often shortened to The Decisive Treatise) is an Islamic philosophical treatise written by Andalusian Muslim polymath and philosopher Ibn Rushd (Averroes) (1126–1198), in which the author "critically examine[s] the alleged tension between philosophy and religion" and concludes that philosophy (in particular, Aristotelian philosophy) is not in opposition to—and in fact, works in tandem with—Islamic thought. In the work, Averroes argues that some Muslims have an obligation to study philosophy, and that the subject should be considered an Islamic science. The work also contains several other unique ideas, including Averroes' assertion that the Qur’an should sometimes be read in a non-literal way. According to William Theodore De Bary and Ainslie Embree, On the Harmony of Religions and Philosophy represents a "classic attempt to reconcile religion and philosophy."
