= Todros Todrosi =

Jewish translator

Todros ben Meshullam ben David or Todros Todrosi (born 1313) was a Jewish translator from Arles, France who lived in the early fourteenth century. He translated various Arabic works of Muslim authors into Hebrew, including works of Al-Farabi, Avicenna's Kitab al-Najat and multiple works by Averroes.
