= Isaac ben Abba Mari =

Provençal rabbi (c.1122–c.1193)

Isaac ben Abba Mari (c. 1122 – c. 1193) was a Provençal rabbi who hailed from Marseille. He is often simply referred to as "Ba'al ha-Ittur," after his Magnum opus, Ittur Soferim.

== Biography ==
Isaac's father, a great rabbinical authority, who wrote commentaries on the Talmud and responsa, was his teacher. In his "Ittur" Isaac often mentions as another of his teachers his uncle, who, according to a manuscript note was a pupil of Isaac Alfasi. Isaac carried on a friendly correspondence with Rabbeinu Tam, whom he was in the habit of consulting on doubtful questions, though not as a pupil consults a teacher. Abraham ben Nathan of Lunel and Abraham ben Isaac of Narbonne were related to him, while the latter's son-in-law, Raavad, frequently consulted him on scientific questions.

== Sefer haIttur ==
Isaac began his literary activity at the age of seventeen, when, at his father's suggestion, he wrote "Shechitah uTerefot," rules for the slaughtering of animals and the eating of their flesh. At about the same time he wrote a small work on the precepts concerning tzitzit, at the request of Sheshet Benveniste "ha-Nasi" of Barcelona. Both works form a part of the legal codex "Ittur," or "Ittur Soferim," which occupied Isaac about twenty-three years (from 1170 to 1193). Until modern times only the first part of this work was known (Venice, 1608); the whole codex was published first by Schönblum (Lemberg, 1860), and included Isaac's "Aseret ha-Dibrot," which is really only a special name for a part of the Ittur.

The Ittur contains, in three parts, almost a complete code of laws, and is divided as follows:

- Part 1: jurisprudence, including the laws of marriage and divorce;
- Part 2: laws of shechitah and permissible meat, circumcision, tzitzit, tefillin, marriage ceremonies;
- Part 3: "Aseret ha-Dibrot," covering the laws of the following ten subjects: (1) Sukkot (2) lulav; (3) hallel; (4) shofar; (5) Yom Kippur; (6) megillah; (7) Hanukkah; (8) prohibition of chametz on Passover; (9) matzah and maror; (10) general laws for holidays.

The book belongs to the classic productions of rabbinical literature in France. Isaac shows in this work a knowledge of the two Talmuds such as almost no other person of his time possessed. With works on the Geonim, among them many responsa and treatises which are otherwise unknown to-day, he shows the same familiarity as with the productions of the northern French Talmudists. At the same time he proceeds independently in his criticism, without regard to the age or reputation of former authorities, and spares not even the Geonim and Isaac Alfasi, though he admired them greatly.

=== Impact ===
While Spanish and German Talmudists, up to the time of the Tur, often mentioned the Ittur, and authorities like Rashba, Rosh, Mordechai, and several others refer to this work, after the appearance and wide circulation of the "Tur" it soon shared the fate of many other codices (as, for example, Avraham ben Isaac's "Eshkol"), and fell into disuse. Joseph Caro was the first who, after a long interval, made use of the Ittur, but even he does not appear to have had the whole work before him.

At the end of the seventeenth century Jacob b. Israel Sason wrote a commentary to a part of the Ittur, under the title "Bnei Ya'akov" (Constantinople, 1704). In the eighteenth century the following authors wrote commentaries to the work: Eliezer b. Jacob ("Nachum"; not published); Abraham Giron ("Tikkun Soferim uMikra Soferim" (Constantinople, 1756, with text); Jacob b. Abraham de Boton gives fragments of his commentary to the Ittur in his collection of responsa, "Edut beYa'akov" (Salonica, 1720); while a similar work by Solomon al-Gazi was lost during its author's lifetime. Samuel Schönblum published an edition of the Ittur annotated by himself. Meïr Jonah b. Samuel wrote a very exhaustive and learned commentary.

== Other works ==
Isaac wrote also marginal notes to Alfasi's "Halakhot," with the title "Me'ah She'arim," which appeared for the first time in a Wilna edition of Alfasi (1881-97). No trace has been preserved of his commentary to Ketubot, which he quotes.
