= Moses ben Joseph ben Merwan ha-Levi =

12th-century Provençal rabbi, philosopher and Talmudist

Moses ben Joseph ben Merwan ha-Levi (Also known as Moses Halavi or ha-Lawi or simply Allawi) flourished about the mid-12th century and was a prominent Provençal rabbi, philosopher, and talmudist.

== Biography ==
He was a nephew and pupil of Isaac ben Merwan ha-Levi. His colleagues addressed him as "Great scholar, Nasi Rabbi Moses," and his ritual decisions and Talmudic comments are often quoted.

He directed the yeshiva at Narbonne, and several of his pupils subsequently achieved fame. Abraham ben David and Zerachiah ha-Levi of Girona were among his pupils. He was in continuous correspondence with his younger colleague Abraham ben Isaac of Narbonne, the av bet din, who was his pupil and who, by preference, sought Moses' advice in difficult casuistic questions.

He was well regarded by several rabbis, such as Isaac Abarbanel, Hasdai Crescas, Joseph Albo, and Joseph Ibn Waqar (all of whom quote him).

Jacob ben Moses of Bagnols quotes a document relating to a divorce drawn up at Narbonne in 1134 and signed by the "great rabbi Moses ben Joseph and by Eliezer ben Zechariah. "Gross identifies Moses ben Joseph with Moses ben Joseph ben Merwan ha-Levi. If this identification is correct, Moses was one of the foremost cabalists of southern France, as Jacob's words in the passage cited indicate. However, Moses is not otherwise known as a mystic.

== Works ==
- Ma'amar Elohi: A treatise encompassing the motion of 'the outermost sphere', the Prime Mover or First Cause, and the intellect or consciousness of God, and their unity. Originally written in Judeo-Arabic in Seville. He relied exclusively on Islamic philosophers like al-Farabi and Averroes. Four manuscripts exist.

Assuming that Steinschneider's identification is correct, Allawi may have also contributed a work on musical harmonies, quoted by Shemtov Shaprut b. Isaac of Tudela, in his commentary on Avicenna's Canon (Munich, Ms. Hebr. 8, fol. 330b), describes the mathematical relations of musical intervals as well as some arithmetical operations carried out with them.

== See also ==
- Hachmei Provence
