= Isaac ben Merwan ha-Levi =

Provençal rabbi

Isaac ben Merwan ha-Levi (Hebrew: יצחק בן מרון הלוי; flourished in the first third of the 12th century) was a Provençal rabbi and Talmudist; he was the elder son of Merwan of Narbonne.

As highly respected in the community as his father, he was elected rabbi of Narbonne. He is often quoted, his Talmudic decisions being regarded as decisive. He directed the yeshibah, and several of his pupils achieved distinction, among them being his nephew Moses ben Joseph, Moses ben Jacob ha-Nasi, and Abraham ben Isaac, "ab bet din" of Narbonne.

== See also ==
- Hachmei Provence
