= Ibn Tibbon =

Family

Ibn Tibbon (Hebrew: אבן תבון) is a family of Jewish rabbis and translators that lived principally in Provence in the 12th and 13th centuries.

== Prominent family members ==
Prominent members of the family include:

- Judah ben Saul ibn Tibbon (1120–after 1190), translator and physician.

Born in Granada, he left Spain in 1150, probably on account of anti-Semitic persecution by the Almohades, and went to Lunel in southern France. Benjamin of Tudela mentions him as a physician there in 1160. He died around 1190, in Marseille, France.

- Samuel ben Judah ibn Tibbon (Lunel, 1150–Marseille, 1230), more commonly known as Samuel ibn Tibbon, Jewish philosopher and doctor.

Best known for his translations of Jewish rabbinic literature from Arabic to Hebrew, he was an adherent of Maimonides and his interpretation of the Bible, and is famous for his translations and writings on the philosophy of Maimonides.

- Moses ibn Tibbon (born in Marseille; flourished between 1240 and 1283) was a Jewish physician, author, and translator.

The number of works written by Moses ibn Tibbon makes it probable that he reached a great age. He was son of Samuel ibn Tibbon, and father of the Judah ibn Tibbon who was prominent in the Maimonidean controversy that took place at Montpellier.

- Judah ben Moses ibn Tibbon

A rabbi in Montpellier; he took part in the dispute between the followers and the opponents of Maimonides. He induced his relative Jacob ben Machir ibn Tibbon to support the Maimonidean party by pointing out that the anti-Maimonideans were the opponents of his grandfather Samuel ibn Tibbon and his grandfather's son-in-law, Jacob ben Abba Mari ben Samson ben Anatoli. In consequence of this, Jacob ben Machir ibn Tibbon protested against the reading of Solomon ben Adret's letter to the community of Montpellier, which nevertheless took place in the synagogue of that city on the following day, a Sabbath, in the month of Elul, 1304. According to Jacob ben Machir ibn Tibbon, Judah wrote various works. None of them are extant.

- Jacob ben Machir ibn Tibbon, known as Prophatius, (Marseille (probably) c.1236–Montpellier, c.1304), an astronomer.

He was a grandson of Samuel ben Judah ibn Tibbon. In the controversy between the Maimonists and the anti-Maimonists, Jacob defended science against the attacks of Abba Mari and his party.

== Others ==
- Samuel ibn Tibbon. The son of Moses ibn Tibbon, he is first mentioned in a responsum of Solomon ben Adret (Neubauer, in "R. E. J." xii. 82 et seq.), which narrates a suit brought by Samuel against his rich young cousin Bionguda (). Bionguda was the youngest of three daughters born to Bella, the daughter of Moses ibn Tibbon. After the death of her husband, Jacob ha-Kohen (1254), Bella went to Marseille, where Bionguda became engaged to Isaac ben Isaac. Samuel ibn Tibbon, who at that time was probably living at Marseille, contested the legality of the marriage to Isaac ben Isaac, saying that he had made Bionguda his legal wife while she was still living at Naples. Bionguda denied this.
- Abraham ibn Tibbon. Translator of Aristotle's Economics. His exact relationship to the Tibbon family is unknown.

== See also ==
- Hachmei Provence
