= Abd al-Wahid al-Marrakushi =

Maghrebi historian (1185–1250)

ʽAbd al-Wahid al-Marrakushi
- عبد الواحد المراكشي
- Born: Abd al-Wāḥid ibn ʿAlī al-Tamīmī al-Marrākushī c. 1185; Marrakesh, Almohad Caliphate
- Died: c. 1262; Cairo, Mamluk Sultanate
- Occupation: Historian

Academic work
- Era: Almohad period
- Notable works: Kitab al-mujib fi talkhis akhbar ahl al-Maghrib (The Pleasant Book in Summarizing the History of the Maghreb)

Abd al-Wahid al-Marrakushi (Arabic: عبد الواحد المراكشي; c. 1185 – c. 1262) was a Moroccan historian who lived during the Almohad period.

== Life ==
Abdelwahid was born in Marrakesh in c. 1185 during the reign of Yaqub al-Mansur, in 1194 he moved to Fez to pursue his studies, but continued traveling back and forth between the two cities for academic purposes. In 1206 he left for al-Andalus where he stayed for nine years before returning to Marrakesh. In 1224 he completed Kitab al-mujib fi talkhis akhbar ahl al-Maghrib (The pleasant book in summarizing the history of the Maghreb), a history of the Almohad dynasty as well as the preceding dynasty of the Almoravids coupled with a summary of al-Andalus history from the Muslim conquest until 1224. The book was written in a light-hearted spirit with many anecdotes; Abdelwahid explained that his intention was to inform and entertain the students in a summarized way since academic history books tend to be overly lengthy which can sometimes bore the reader. The book contains valuable information about Ibn Rushd (a contemporary of Abdelwahid) as well as information directly taken from the Almohad archives, various princes and accounts of events that the author witnessed.

Although he vowed respect for the Almohad movement and its founding tribe, the Masmuda, the book was fairly objective as it contained criticism of the actions of some of its kings as well as a neutral account of the movement's founder Ibn Tumart and his teachings. Another aspect of this is the account about the Almoravids, who were the rivals of the Almohads, but were properly credited with their good deeds. Additionally events of in-fighting between the Almohad princes were properly reported, contrary to Ibn Abi Zar, writing a century later under the Marinids, who omitted to report about significant plots and revolts that occurred during his lifetime.

Abdelwahid finished his life in Egypt, as he reported in his book that the later events of the Almohads did not reach him in great detail since he was away.

== Bibliography ==
- Abdel Wahid al-Marrakushi, The history of the Almohades, preceded by a sketch of the history of Spain from the time of the conquest till the reign of Yúsof ibn-Téshúfin, and of the history of the Almoravides, ed. R.P.A. Dozy, 1968 (reprint of the second edition, Leyden 1881; first edition, Leyden 1847)
