= 8318 Averroes =

Main-belt asteroid

Discovery
- Discovered by: C. J. van Houten; I. van Houten-G. T. Gehrels
- Discovery site: Palomar Obs.
- Discovery date: 29 September 1973

Designations
- Pronunciation: /əˈvɛroʊiːz/
- Named after: Averroës (medieval Muslim astronomer)
- Alternative designations: 1306 T-2 · 1990 QC_{7}
- Minor planet category: main-belt · (outer); Themis · background

Orbital characteristics
- Epoch 23 March 2018 (JD 2458200.5)
- Uncertainty parameter 0
- Observation arc: 64.13 yr (23,425 d)
- Aphelion: 3.6928 AU
- Perihelion: 2.6721 AU
- Semi-major axis: 3.1824 AU
- Eccentricity: 0.1604
- Orbital period (sidereal): 5.68 yr (2,074 d)
- Mean anomaly: 245.92°
- Mean motion: 0° 10^{m} 24.96^{s} / day
- Inclination: 0.5168°
- Longitude of ascending node: 113.64°
- Argument of perihelion: 297.35°

Physical characteristics
- Mean diameter: 10.159±0.244 km
- Geometric albedo: 0.075±0.008
- Spectral type: C (est. Themis family)
- Absolute magnitude (H): 13.5

8318 Averroes /əˈvɛroʊiːz/ is a dark Themistian asteroid from the outer regions of the asteroid belt, approximately 10 kilometers (6 miles) in diameter. It was discovered on 29 September 1973, by Dutch astronomers Ingrid and Cornelis van Houten at Leiden, and Tom Gehrels the Palomar Observatory, and assigned the provisional designation 1306 T-2. The likely C-type asteroid was named after medieval Muslim astronomer Averroës.

== Orbit and classification ==
Averroes is a core member of the Themis family (602), a prominent family. Alternatively, a different HCM-analysis by Nesvorny found it to be a Background asteroid.

It orbits the Sun in the outer asteroid belt at a distance of 2.7–3.7 AU once every 5 years and 8 months (2,074 days; semi-major axis of 3.18 AU). Its orbit has an eccentricity of 0.16 and an inclination of 1° with respect to the ecliptic. The body's observation arc begins with a precovery taken at Palomar in April 1953, more than 20 years prior to its official discovery observation.

=== Palomar–Leiden Trojan survey ===
The survey designation "T-2" stands for the second Palomar–Leiden Trojan survey, named after the fruitful collaboration of the Palomar and Leiden Observatory in the 1960s and 1970s. Gehrels used Palomar's Samuel Oschin telescope (also known as the 48-inch Schmidt Telescope), and shipped the photographic plates to Ingrid and Cornelis van Houten at Leiden Observatory where astrometry was carried out. The trio are credited with the discovery of several thousand asteroid discoveries.

== Physical characteristics ==
While no spectral type has been determined, Averroes is likely a carbonaceous C-type asteroid, based on its membership to the Themis family and the most common type in the outer main-belt. The asteroid has an absolute magnitude of 13.5. As of 2018, no rotational lightcurve of Averroes has been obtained from photometric observations. The body's rotation period, pole and shape remain unknown.

=== Diameter and albedo ===
According to the survey carried out by the NEOWISE mission of NASA's Wide-field Infrared Survey Explorer, Averroes measures 10.159 kilometers in diameter and its surface has an albedo of 0.075.

== Naming ==
This minor planet was named after Muhammad ibn Rushd (1126–1198), also known by his Latin name as Averroes, a medieval Muslim polymath from Andalusia, whose many scientific accomplishments include a study of astronomy. The name "ibn Rushd" was Latinized to "Averroes", as his commentaries on Aristotle were being translated into Latin, bringing knowledge of that famous philosopher back to Christendom, where it had been nearly forgotten. These kinds of Latin translations of the 12th century brought classical and Islamic knowledge into Europe, spurring the Renaissance. The official naming citation was published by the Minor Planet Center on 5 October 1998 (M.P.C. 32792).
