= Jedaiah ben Abraham Bedersi =

13th-14th century Jewish poet, physician, and philosopher

Jedaiah ben Abraham Bedersi (c. 1270 – c. 1340) (Hebrew: ידעיה הבדרשי) was a Jewish poet, physician, and philosopher; born at Béziers (hence his surname Bedersi). His Occitan name was En Bonet, which probably corresponds to the Hebrew name Tobiah; and, according to the practices of Hachmei Provence, he occasionally joined to his name that of his father, Abraham Bedersi.

In his poems he assumed the appellation "Penini" (הפניני, "Dispenser of Pearls"), and because of this appellation the ethical work Mibḥar haPeninim of Solomon ibn Gabirol has been erroneously ascribed to Bedersi.

== Early life ==
Bedersi was a precocious child. He was scarcely fifteen years old when he published his work Baqqashat ha-Memin "The Mem Prayer", a hymn of 1000 words, each of which begins with the letter mem, translated into Latin and German. Bedersi's father, very much pleased with the evidence of his child's precocity, expressed his approbation in a short poem, which in many editions is given at the end of the hymn. The work contains only mere quibbles on Biblical passages and is often very obscure, but considering the age of the author, the facility with which he handles the Hebrew vocabulary is astonishing.

== Sefer ha-Pardes ==
Bedersi's Talmudical knowledge must have been equally extensive; for, as may be seen in the introduction to his commentary on the Aggadah of the Talmud, he was but fifteen years old when he entered the Talmudical school of R. Meshullam. At the age of seventeen he produced his ethical work Sefer ha-Pardes (The Book of the Garden). This treatise, first published at Constantinople in 1515 (?) and reproduced by Joseph Luzzatto in Ozar ha-Ṣifrut, iii., is divided into eight chapters:

1. on isolation from the world, and the inconstancy of the latter
2. on divine worship and devotion
3. on instruction, and the sciences that men should acquire after having familiarized themselves with their religious obligations
4. on the laws and the conduct of the judge
5. on grammar
6. on sophism
7. on astronomy
8. on rhetoric and poetry.

== Oheb Nashim ==
At eighteen he published a work in defense of women, entitled Ẓilẓal Kenafayim (The Rustling of Wings) or Oheb Nashim (The Women-Lover). In the short introduction to this treatise, Bedersi says that he wrote it against Judah ibn Shabbethai's Sone ha-Nashim (The Woman-Hater). The young poet dedicated this composition to his two friends, Meïr and Judah, sons of Don Solomon Dels-Enfanz of Arles. It was written in rhymed prose, and has been edited by Neubauer in the Zunz Jubelschrift, 1884.

== Other works ==
These poetical productions of Bedersi's youth were followed by a number of works of a more serious character, among which were:

1. A philosophical commentary on the Aggadah of diverse parts of the Midrashim such as Midrash Rabba, Tanhuma, Sifre, Pirke De-Rabbi Eliezer, and Midrash Tehillim (copies of this commentary are still extant in manuscript in several European libraries).
2. Iggeret Hitnaẓẓelut ("Apologetical Letter"), addressed to Shlomo ibn Aderet, who, at the instigation of Abba Mari, had pronounced an anathema against the works and partisans of Maimonides and against science in general. Bedersi, after having expressed his respect for the upright and learned rabbi of Barcelona, remarked that he and his friends were not indignant about the ban, because science was invulnerable. Their grievance was that Ben Adret should have branded the Jewish congregations of southern France as heretics. From time immemorial, science had been fostered by Jewish scholars on account of its importance for religion. This was true in greatest measure of Maimonides, who studied philosophy, mathematics, astronomy, and medicine by the aid of the Greek writers; in theology, however, he was guided by tradition, submitting even in this to the investigations of philosophy. He, Bedersi, therefore, entreats Solomon ben Adret to withdraw the excommunication for the sake of Maimonides—whose works would be studied in spite of all excommunication—for his own (Ben Adret's) sake, and for the good name of Provençal Jewish learning. The Iggeret Hitnaẓẓelut has been incorporated with Solomon ben Adret's Responsa, § 418.
3. Beḥinat ha'Olam ("The Examination of the World")

== Behinat ha-ʿOlam ==
Beḥinat ha-ʿOlam (The Examination of the World), called also by its first words, "Shamayim la-Rom" (Heaven's Height), a didactic poem written after the 1306 expulsion of Jews from France, to which event reference is made in the eleventh chapter (compare Renan-Neubauer, Les Ecrivains Juifs Français, p. 37). This poem is divided into 37 short chapters, and may be summarized as follows:

The sage, though the highest type of humanity, is liable to the vicissitudes of fortune. He is not exempt from any of the evils which assail humanity; and the sword of death stabs alike the philosopher and the boor. But, if this view be dispiriting, there is another which is consoling. The soul which lives within him, when man is bereft of this world's goods, will accompany him beyond the grave. Still, to the shame of humanity, man does not care to improve this noblest part of himself. He is entrapped by the perfidious charms of the world; and his years roll away in search of illusions.

And yet the world is nothing but a tempestuous sea; time is naught but a bridge thrown over the abyss connecting the negation that preceded existence with the eternity that is to follow it. The slightest inadvertence can precipitate him who crosses this bridge into the abyss. Are worldly pleasures, then, worth seeking? After their enjoyment follows despair, a vacuum never to be filled. Unfortunate are they who give way to their enticements. Can one be heedless when so many agents of destruction are suspended over his head; when the stars that roll above him and survey his fate bring about, in their rapid courses, unforeseen but inevitable events, that the decree of the Eternal has attached to their movement.

But do not, child of man, accuse the Author of nature of the evils that overwhelm thy short and frail existence. The evils thou complainest of are of thine own making. As for the Eternal, His words are all wisdom and goodness. Man aspires in vain to understand them; they are beyond his intelligence. All that may be conceived of Him is that He is inconceivable. Celestial by origin, the human soul, so long as it is attached to the body, groans under a shameful slavery. The occupation worthy of its noble extraction is therefore to direct all its faculties toward the worship of its Creator, the happiness of its fellow-creatures, and the triumph of truth. This result can be attained only in keeping the commandments of God.

Bedersi concludes his poem by expressing his admiration for Maimonides:

Finally, turn neither to the left nor to the right from all that the wise men believed, the chief of whom was the distinguished master Maimonides, of blessed memory, with whom no one can be compared from among the wise men who have lived since the close of the Talmud; then I shall be sure that thou, enriched with all the knowledge of religion and philosophy, wilt fear the Lord thy God.

According to Husik, Bedersi as the author of this poem is the "wise man" quoted by Joseph Albo in Sefer HaIkkarim (II:30) on the unknowability of God:

The most that we can understand about God is that we can not understand Him, as the wise man said: The sum total of what we know of Thee is that we do not know Thee.

This poem enjoyed the greatest success. Published first at Mantua by Estellina, wife of Abraham Conat, between 1476 and 1480, it was republished 67 times (compare Bibliotheca Friedlandiana, ii. 139), with many commentaries, among which are those written by Moshe ibn Habib, Jacob Frances, and Yom-Tov Lipmann Heller. Four commentaries written by Isaac Monçon, Jacob (of Fano?), Leon of Mantua, and Immanuel of Lattes the Younger are still extant in manuscript (MSS. at St. Petersburg and at the Bodleian Library, Oxford, Nos. 502 and 1404). The poem was translated into Latin by Uchtman; into German by Isaac ben Isaiah Auerbach, Hirsch ben Meïr, Joel ben Joseph Faust or Wust, Simson Hamburger, Auerbach (who made use of a translation of parts iv. and v. by Mendelssohn), J. Levy, Joseph Hirschfeld, and (in verse) by Stern, preceded by an interesting Hebrew introduction by Weiss; into French by Philippe Aquinas and Michel Beer; into Italian in Antologia Israelitica, 1880, pp. 334 et seq.; into English by Tobias Goodman; into Polish by J. Tugendhold. Moshe Kunitz wrote a commentary on it entitled HaOyen.

== Minor works ==
According to Luzzatto (Ḥotam Toknit, Appendix, p. 5), Bedersi was also the author of the poem Baḳḳashat ha-Lamedin (The Lamed Prayer), or Bet El (House of God), or Batte Nefesh (Tablets), a prayer composed of 412 words in which only the letters from "alef" to "lamed" occur. This composition is commonly attributed to his father, Abraham Bedersi. Another poem, entitled Elef Alfin (Thousand Alephs), composed of 1000 words, each of which begins with the letter aleph, also attributed to Abraham Bedersi, seems to have been written by Jedaiah. In this poem the author bewails the sufferings and the exile of the Jews, which can only refer to the banishment of the Jews from France in 1306 (compare Luzzatto, l.c.; Shem haGedolim, of Chaim Yosef David Azulai ii. s.v.; Heinrich Graetz, Gesch. der Juden, vii. 206).

== Philosophical works ==
Bedersi also wrote a large number of treatises on philosophy, several of which are quoted by Moses ibn Ḥabib in the introduction to his commentary on the Beḥinat ha-'Olam. Seven of these works are still extant in manuscript:

1. Annotations on the Physics of Averroes (De Rossi MS. No. 1398)
2. Annotations on the Canon of Avicenna (MSS. Oxford, Nos. 2100, 2107, and 2121, 6)
3. Ketab ha-Da'at (Treatise on the Intellect), a modification of the Hebrew version (entitled Sefer ha-Sekel we ha-Muskalat) of Alfarabi's Arabic work, Kitab al-'Akl we al-Ma'akulat
4. Ha-De'ot be-Sekel ha-Ḥomri (The Theories Concerning the Material Intellect), in which Bedersi gives the diverse opinions on the Passive Intellect as expounded by Aristotle in De Anima (compare Alexander of Aphrodisias)
5. Ha-Ma'amar be-Hafoke ha-Meḥallek (Treatise on the Opposites in the Motions of the Spheres), explaining a passage in the commentary of Averroes on Aristotle's De Cœlo, i. 4
6. Ketab ha-Hit'aẓmut (Book of Consolidation), in which Bedersi answers the objections made by a friend of his to the theories expounded in the preceding work
7. a dissertation, bearing no title, on the question whether (in Aristotelian philosophy) individuals of the same species, diverse in their "accidents", differ also in their essential form; or whether form is inherent in the species and embraces it entirely, so that individuals differ solely by reason of their "accidents". In Bedersi's opinion there are two forms: a general one embracing the whole species; and a special individual form which is essential and can not be considered as an "accident". In this dissertation is quoted another work of Bedersi's, his Midbar Ḳadmut (The Desert of Antiquity), containing a commentary—no longer in existence—on the twenty-five premises given by Maimonides in his introduction to the second volume of the Guide of the Perplexed. It is probable that Bedersi wrote a supercommentary on the commentary on Genesis by Abraham ibn Ezra, although some attribute it to Rabbi Asher Crescas (compare Steinschneider, Cat. Bodl. col. 1283) and that he was the author of the philosophical poem on the thirteen articles of belief of Maimonides (compare Luzzatto, Ḥotam Tokhnit, p. 2).
