= Colliget =

Medical encyclopedia by Averroes

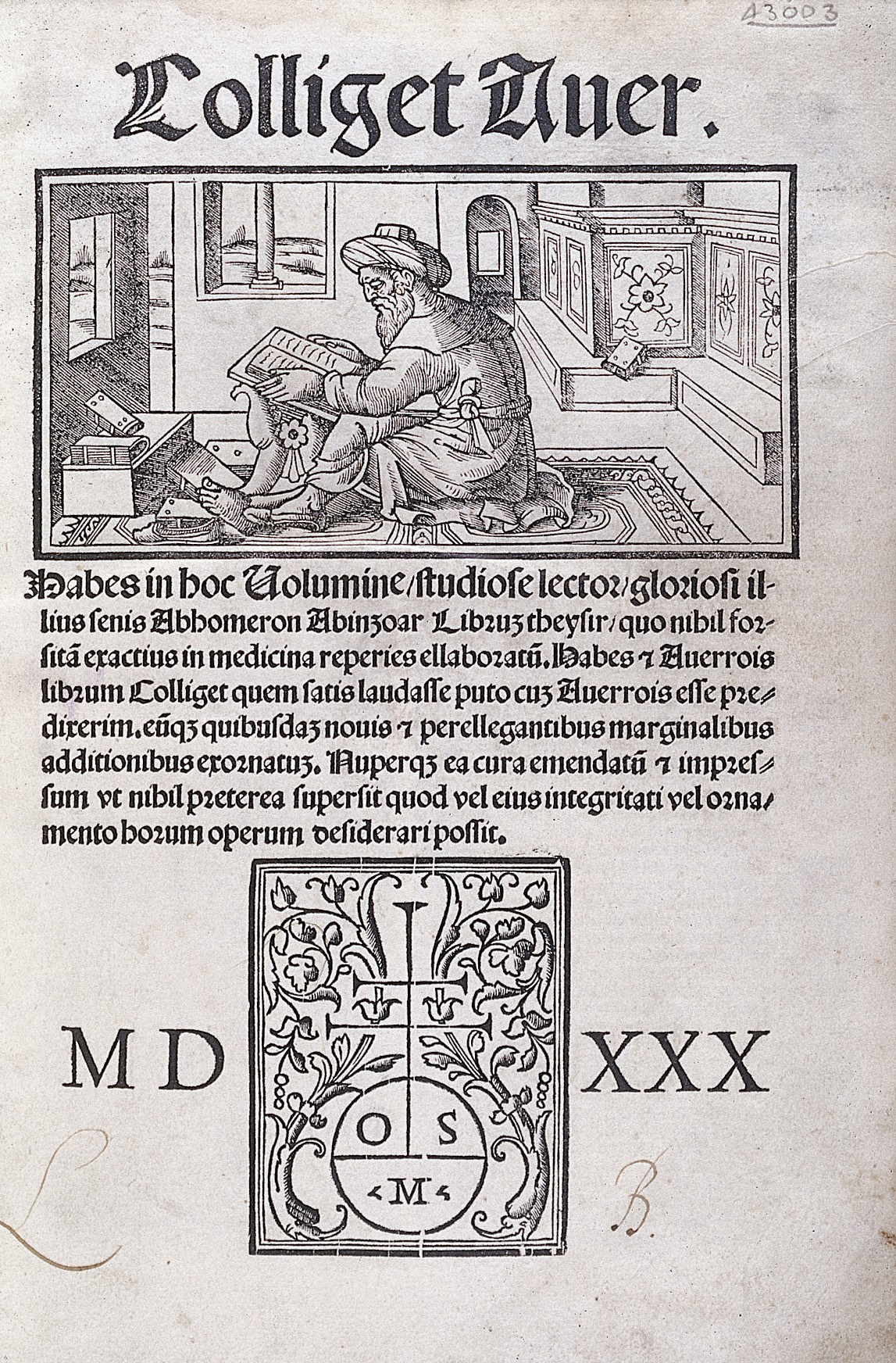
Page from Averroes' Colliget

The Kulliyat (Arabic: الـكـلّـيـات في الـطـب, romanized: al-Kulliyāt fi al-ṭibb, lit. 'The General Principles of Medicine'), mostly known by its Latin translation as Colliget, is a medical encyclopedia written by the Andalusian polymath Averroes. The title of the book is opposite to "The Specificities of Medicine" (Arabic: جزئیات في الـطـب, romanized: al-Juzʾiyyāt fi al-ṭibb), which was written by his friend ibn Zuhr. The two collaborated, intending that their books complement each other. Written between 1153 and 1169, the Colliget was eventually translated into Medieval Hebrew and Latin and became a widely used textbook in Europe until the 18th century.
