= Bonet de Lattes =

Jewish astrologer

Bonet de Lattes (by 1450 – after 1514) was a European Jewish physician and astrologer. He is known chiefly as the inventor of an astronomical ring-dial by means of which solar and stellar altitudes can be measured and the time determined with great precision by night as well as by day. He lived in the latter part of the fifteenth century and the beginning of the sixteenth.

Originally from Provence, and belonging to a family that had its origin in Lattes near Montpellier, he was forced to leave Provence when the Jews were expelled from that land and settled in Carpentras. From there, he went to Rome, where he became physician to Pope Alexander VI, and later to Pope Leo X.

At this time he became rabbi of the Jewish community, to which he was able to render much assistance. He married the daughter of the physician Comprat Mossé of Aix.

Bonet described the use of his instrument in a treatise written in Carpentras, the full title of which is: Boneti de Latis, Medici Provenzalis, Annuli per eum Composti Super Astrologiæ Utilitate. It appeared as a supplement to the Calculatio Composta in Rima de Juliano de Dati, Rome, 1493, and was dedicated to Pope Alexander VI. At the end, Bonet craves pardon for his bad Latin, on the score of being a Hebrew. The treatise was republished by Jacques Lefèvre d'Étaples, together with his own commentary on John Sacrobosco's De Sphæra Mundi and Euclid's Geometry, Paris, 1500. Editions were also published in 1507, 1521, and 1534. Two editions appeared later at Marburg, in 1537 and 1557. In bad Latin, Bonet wrote a treatise entitled Prognosticum, published at Rome in 1498, and dedicated to Cardinal Valentiniani and Cardinal de Borgia, in which he predicted the coming of the Messiah in the year 1505. A full account of the book is to be found in Abraham Farissol's manuscript, "Magen Abraham," or "Wikuaḥ ha-Dat."

A pupil of Jacob Faber, Charles Bovillus (1470–1553), relates in the preface to his Dialogi de Trinitate that he met Bonet de Lates in the Roman ghetto in 1507, and went to his house in order to see the ring that he had invented. The top part of the house was a synagogue containing the ark, hidden by a curtain, and books, lamps, and praying-scarfs. Here, also, Bonet's thirty-two-year-old son was discovered deeply immersed in the study of philosophy. Toward the end of the nineteenth century, in dredging the River Tiber, a long marble slab was found with an inscription, which had probably been affixed to this house of Bonet's. Bovillus refers, also, to a lengthy theological argument that he had with Bonet, and he seems to imply that the son was in the end convinced of the truth of the Christian faith.

It is evidence of the position held by Bonet at the papal court that on 13 October 1513, Reuchlin begged him to use his influence in order that the examination of the Augenspiegel should not be given into the hands of a commission made up of strangers, at all events not of Dominicans. Further, Bonet's intercession seems to have been successful.

Bonet is known to have had two sons. One, Joseph, continued to remain in the papal favor; the other, Immanuel, was also in the service of the pope, from whom he received a regular salary.

== See also ==
- Hachmei Provence
- History of the Jews in France
