= Hachmei Provence =

Jewish rabbis of Provence

Hachmei Provence (Hebrew: חכמי פרובנס, lit. 'sages of Provence') refers to the hekhamim, "sages" or "rabbis", of Provence, now Occitania in France, which was a great center for Rabbinical Jewish scholarship in the times of the Tosafists. The singular form is hakham, a Sephardic and Hachmei Provençal term for a rabbi.

In matters of halakha, as well as in their traditions and customs, the Provençal hekhamim occupy an intermediate position between the Sephardic Judaism of the neighboring Spanish scholars and the Old French (similar to the Nusach Ashkenaz) tradition represented by the Tosafists.

The term "Provence" in Jewish tradition is not limited to today's administrative region of Provence but to the entirety of Occitania. This includes Narbonne (which is sometimes informally, though incorrectly, transliterated as "Narvona" as a result of the back-and-forth transliteration between Rabbinical Hebrew and Old Occitan), Lunel (which is informally transliterated Lunil), and the city of Montpellier, 7 kilometres (4.3 mi) from the Mediterranean coast. It also included cities which at that time formed part of the Catalonia's political and cultural domain, such as Perpignan. In some ways, the Jewish traditions of Catalonia were closer to those of Provence than to those of the Kingdom of Castile and al-Andalus.

There was a distinctive Provençal liturgy used by the Jews of the Papal enclave of Comtat Venaissin, known as Papal Jews, who remained following the expulsion of the Jews from the rest of France. After the French Revolution, when France annexed Comtat Venaissin, the Provençal rite was replaced by the Portuguese Sephardic liturgy, which is used by the Jews of Carpentras today.

== Partial list ==
=== Narbonne ===
- Moses ha-Darshan
- Makhir of Narbonne and his great family
- Moses ben Joseph ben Merwan ha-Levi
- Joseph Kimhi and sons David Kimhi and Moses Kimhi
- Abraham ben Isaac of Narbonne
- Isaac ben Merwan ha-Levi
- Aaron ben Jacob ha-Kohen

=== Lunel ===
- Zerachiah ha-Levi of Girona the Baal haMaor
- Abraham ben Nathan haYarhi (Yareah is Hebrew for moon, which is Lune in French, the source for the city-name Lunel)
- Yonatan HaKohen of Lunel
- Abba Mari haYarhi, and his son Isaac
- Meshullam ben Jacob
- Asher ben Meshullam
- Rava Shlomo Yitzchaki (Rashi) (disputed)

=== Montpellier ===
- Solomon ben Abraham of Montpellier who led the movement against Maimonides

=== Rest of Provence ===
- Abraham ben David known as the RABaD or RABaD III
- His son Isaac the Blind, a famous Kabbalist
- Menachem Meiri
- Nathan ben Meir of Trinquetaille
- Shem-Tob ben Isaac of Tortosa
- The famous family Ibn Tibbon
- Caslari family of Carpentras
- Bonet de Lattes
- Jacob Anatoli
- Gersonides
- Gerson ben Solomon Catalan
- Abraham Bedersi
- Jedaiah ben Abraham Bedersi

=== Members of the Kalonymus Family ===
- Kalonymus ben Kalonymus of Avignon
- Kalonymus ben Todros
