= Juan Vernet =

Spanish science historian and Arabist (1923 - 2011)

Juan Vernet Ginés or Joan Vernet i Ginés (1923 - 2011) was a Spanish science historian, Arabist and professor at the University of Barcelona for over thirty years. He was the pupil and intellectual heir of orientalist Maria Millàs Vallicrosa. The rigor and scope of his scholarly work give him international authority in the field of the history of science and cultural transfers between East and West. Author of the book "What culture owes to the Arabs of Spain", he also translated the Quran and One Thousand and One Nights into Castilian Spanish.

== Bibliography ==
Juan Vernet was born on 31 July 1923 in Barcelona to a family originating in Tarragona. From 1931–1932, Juan Vernet was a student at the German School of Barcelona. In 1933, he attended the municipal school of Prades, located in the province of Tarragona. From 1936–1939, he studied for his baccalaureate at the Salmerón Institute on Muntaner Street in Barcelona. He learned French by memorizing texts and translating news.

Being afflicted at a young age with chronic bronchitis, which continued to affect him all his life, he was forced to endure long months of confinement and bed rest, which he devoted to study. As a teenager, he began to decipher cuneiform writing and to visit the prestigious Ateneo Library in Barcelona where he discovered a journal of assyriology (cuneiform studies) and correspondence from Hammurabi, king of Babylon.
