= Averroes =

Andalusian Muslim polymath (1126–1198)

Averroes Ibn Rushd
- ابن رشد
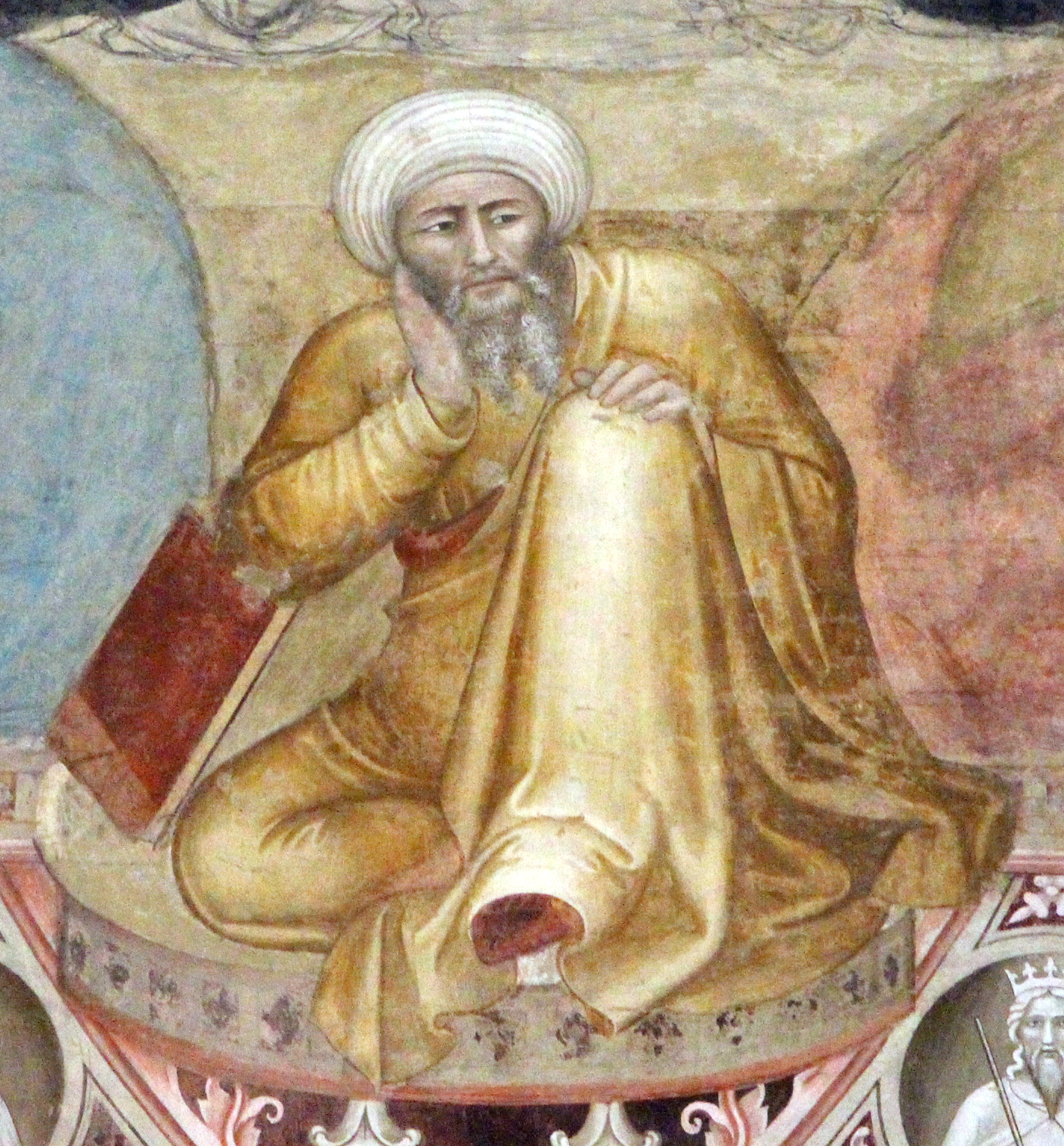
- Portrait in the Basilica of Santa Maria Novella, c. 1366
- Born: 14 April 1126; Córdoba, Al-Andalus, Almoravid Empire
- Died: 11 December 1198 (aged 72); Marrakesh, Almohad Caliphate
- Other names: Abū al-Walīd Muḥammad ibn Aḥmad ibn Rushd; The Commentator; Ibn Rushd al-Hafid (The Grandson)

Philosophical work
- Era: Medieval, Islamic Golden Age
- Region: Islamic philosophy
- School: Aristotelianism, Averroism
- Main interests: Islamic theology, philosophy, Islamic jurisprudence, medicine, astronomy, physics, linguistics
- Notable works: Colliget, On the Harmony of Religions and Philosophy, The Incoherence of the Incoherence
- Notable ideas: Relation between Islam and philosophy, non-contradiction of reason and revelation, unity of the intellect

Ibn Rushd (Note: Arabic: ابن رشد; full name in Arabic: أبو الوليد محمد بن أحمد بن رشد, romanized: Abū al-Walīd Muḥammad ibn Aḥmad ibn Rushd) (14 April 1126 – 11 December 1198), Latinized as Averroes, (Note: English: /əˈvɛroʊiːz/) was an Andalusian polymath and jurist who was proficient in a variety of intellectual fields, including philosophy, theology, medicine, astronomy, physics, psychology, mathematics, neurology, Islamic jurisprudence, law, and linguistics. The author of more than 100 books and treatises, his philosophical works include numerous commentaries on Aristotle, for which he was known in the Western world as "The Commentator" and "Father of Rationalism".

Averroes was a strong proponent of Aristotelianism; he attempted to restore what he considered the original teachings of Aristotle and opposed the Neoplatonist tendencies of earlier Muslim thinkers, such as al-Farabi and Avicenna. He also defended the pursuit of philosophy against criticism by Ash'ari theologians such as Al-Ghazali. Averroes argued that philosophy was permissible in Islam and even compulsory among certain elites. He also argued scriptural text should be interpreted allegorically if it appeared to contradict conclusions reached by reason and philosophy. In Islamic jurisprudence, he wrote the Bidāyat al-Mujtahid on the differences between Islamic schools of law and the principles that caused their differences. In medicine, he proposed a new theory of stroke, described the signs and symptoms of Parkinson's disease for the first time, and might have been the first to identify the retina as the part of the eye responsible for sensing light. His medical book Al-Kulliyat fi al-Tibb, translated into Latin and known as the Colliget, became a textbook in Europe for centuries.

His legacy in the Islamic world was modest for geographical and intellectual reasons. In the West, Averroes was known for his extensive commentaries on Aristotle, many of which were translated into Latin and Hebrew. The translations of his work reignited Western European interest in Aristotle and Greek thinkers, an area of study that had been widely abandoned after the fall of the Western Roman Empire. His thoughts generated controversies in Latin Christendom and triggered a philosophical movement called Averroism based on his writings. His unity of the intellect thesis, proposing that all humans share the same intellect, became one of the best-known and most controversial Averroist doctrines in the West. His works were condemned by the Catholic Church in 1270 and 1277. Although weakened by condemnations and sustained critique from Thomas Aquinas, Latin Averroism continued to attract followers up to the sixteenth century.

== Name ==
Ibn Rushd's full, transliterated Arabic name is "Abū l-Walīd Muḥammad ibn ʾAḥmad Ibn Rushd". Sometimes, the nickname al-Hafid ("The Grandson") is appended to his name, to distinguish him from his grandfather, a famous judge and jurist. "Averroes" is the Medieval Latin form of "Ibn Rushd"; it was derived from the Spanish pronunciation of the original Arabic name, wherein "Ibn" becomes "Aben" or "Aven". Other forms of the name in European languages include "Ibin-Ros-din", "Filius Rosadis", "Ibn-Rusid", "Ben-Raxid", "Ibn-Ruschod", "Den-Resched", "Aben-Rassad", "Aben-Rasd", "Aben-Rust", "Avenrosdy", "Avenryz", "Adveroys", "Benroist", "Avenroyth" and "Averroysta".

== Biography ==
=== Early life and education ===
Little is known about Averroes's early life. Muhammad ibn Ahmad ibn Muhammad ibn Rushd was born on 14 April 1126 (520 AH) in Córdoba. His family was well known in the city for their public service, especially in the legal and religious fields. His grandfather Abu al-Walid Muhammad (d. 1126) was the chief judge (qadi) of Córdoba and the imam of the Great Mosque of Córdoba under the Almoravids. His father Abu al-Qasim Ahmad was not as celebrated as his grandfather, but was also chief judge until the Almoravids were replaced by the Almohads in 1146.

According to his traditional biographers, Averroes's education was "excellent", beginning with studies in hadith (traditions of the Islamic prophet Muhammad), fiqh (jurisprudence), medicine and theology. He learned Maliki jurisprudence under al-Hafiz Abu Muhammad ibn Rizq and hadith with Ibn Bashkuwal, a student of his grandfather. His father also taught him about jurisprudence, including on Imam Malik's magnum opus, the Muwatta, which Averroes went on to memorize. He studied medicine under Abu Jafar Jarim al-Tajail, who probably taught him philosophy too. He also knew the works of the philosopher Ibn Bajjah (also known as Avempace), and might have known him personally or been tutored by him. He joined a regular meeting of philosophers, physicians and poets in Seville which was attended by philosophers Ibn Tufayl and Ibn Zuhr as well as the future caliph Abu Yusuf Yaqub. He also studied the kalam theology of the Ash'ari school, which he criticized later in life. His 13th-century biographer Ibn al-Abbar said he was more interested in the study of law and its principles (usul) than that of hadith and he was especially competent in the field of khilaf (disputes and controversies in the Islamic jurisprudence). Ibn al-Abbar also mentioned his interests in "the sciences of the ancients", probably in reference to Greek philosophy and sciences.

=== Career ===
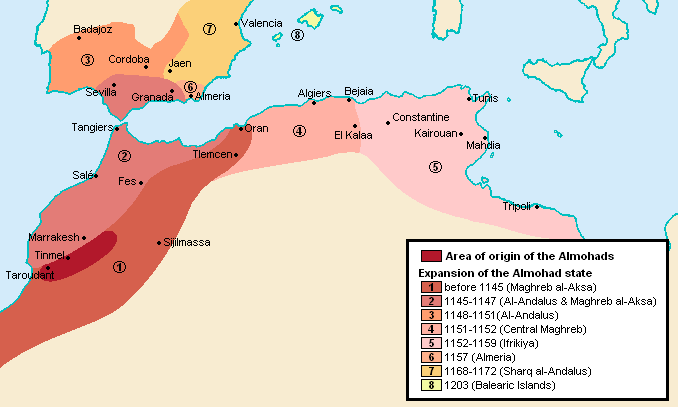
Averroes served various official positions in the Almohad Caliphate, whose territories are depicted in this map.

By 1153 Averroes was in Marrakesh, the capital of the Almohad Caliphate (now in Morocco), to perform astronomical observations and to support the Almohad project of building new colleges. He was hoping to find physical laws of astronomical movements instead of only the mathematical laws known at the time but this research was unsuccessful. During his stay in Marrakesh, he likely met ibn Tufayl, a renowned philosopher and the author of Hayy ibn Yaqdhan who was also the court physician in Marrakesh. Averroes and ibn Tufayl became friends despite the differences in their philosophies.

In 1169, ibn Tufayl introduced Averroes to the Almohad caliph Abu Yaqub Yusuf. In a famous account reported by historian 'Abd al-Wahid al-Marrakushi, the caliph asked Averroes whether the heavens had existed since eternity or had a beginning. Knowing this question was controversial and worried a wrong answer could put him in danger, Averroes did not answer. The caliph then elaborated the views of Plato, Aristotle and Muslim philosophers on the topic and discussed them with Ibn Tufayl. This display of knowledge put Averroes at ease; Averroes then explained his views on the subject, which impressed the caliph. Averroes was similarly impressed by Abu Yaqub and later said the caliph had "a profuseness of learning I did not suspect".

After their introduction, Averroes remained in Abu Yaqub's favor until the caliph died in 1184. When the caliph complained to Ibn Tufayl about the difficulty of understanding Aristotle's work, Ibn Tufayl recommended to the caliph that Averroes work on explaining it. This was the beginning of Averroes's massive commentaries on Aristotle; his first works on the subject were written in 1169.

In the same year, Averroes was appointed qadi (judge) in Seville. In 1171 he became qadi in his hometown of Córdoba. As qadi he would decide cases and give fatwas (legal opinions) based on religious law. The writing rate increased during this time despite other obligations and his travels within the Almohad empire. He also took the opportunity from his travels to conduct astronomical research. Many of his works produced between 1169 and 1179 were dated in Seville rather than Córdoba. In 1179 he was again appointed qadi in Seville. In 1182, he succeeded his friend Ibn Tufayl as court physician. Later the same year, he was appointed chief qadi of Córdoba, then controlled by the Taifa of Seville, a prestigious office that his grandfather had once held.

In 1184 Caliph Abu Yaqub died and was succeeded by Abu Yusuf Yaqub. Initially, Averroes remained in royal favour, but in 1195, his fortune reversed. Various charges were made against him, and a tribunal in Córdoba tried him. The tribunal condemned his teachings, ordered the burning of his works and banished Averroes to nearby Lucena. Early biographers' reasons for this fall from grace include a possible insult to the caliph in his writings but modern scholars attribute it to political reasons. The Encyclopaedia of Islam said the caliph distanced himself from Averroes to gain support from more orthodox ulema, who opposed Averroes and whose support al-Mansur needed for his war against Christian kingdoms. Historian of Islamic philosophy Majid Fakhry also wrote that public pressure from traditional Maliki jurists who were opposed to Averroes played a role.

Egyptian writer Abbas Mahmoud al-Aqqad argued that the underlying causes of Averroes's banishment were primarily political and personal. Al-Aqqad noted that the Almohad state's tolerance for philosophy was driven by political rivalry with the Fatimid Caliphate. He contrasted Averroes with contemporaries like Ibn Bajjah and Ibn Tufayl, observing that Averroes lacked diplomatic tact. This resulted in personal missteps that alienated Caliph Abu Yusuf Yaqub. A notable incident, originally documented by the 13th-century historian 'Abd al-Wahid al-Marrakushi in his chronicle Al-Mu'jib fi Talkhis Akhbar al-Maghrib, involved Averroes referring to the caliph as the "King of the Berbers" in a commentary on zoology, rather than using official royal titles. Furthermore, Averroes's close friendship with the caliph's brother, Abu Yahya (the governor of Córdoba), aroused political suspicions during a period of intense military conflict. Al-Aqqad pointed out that the caliph pardoned Averroes and restored him to favor as soon as these political tensions eased.

Moroccan philosopher Mohammed Abed al-Jabri presented a different political interpretation of the trial. Al-Jabri asserted that Averroes was punished for explicitly condemning political tyranny and despotism in his commentary on Plato's Republic. According to this view, the tribunal served as a political purge disguised under religious pretexts to silence his opposition to the state's authoritarian practices.

The actions taken against Averroes aligned with a broader ideological campaign enforced by Caliph Abu Yusuf Yaqub across the state. The burning of books and suppression of scholars were not isolated to Averroes or the study of philosophy. The Almohad authorities systematically targeted traditional Maliki jurists, ordering the public burning of foundational jurisprudence texts, such as the Mudawwana of Sahnun. The caliph banned the study of applied jurisprudence (ilm al-furu' ) and mandated a strict literalist approach, restricting religious scholarship solely to the Quran and the Hadith collections.

After a few years, Averroes returned to court in Marrakesh and was again in the caliph's favour. He died shortly afterwards, on 11 December 1198 (9 Safar 595 in the Islamic calendar). He was initially buried in North Africa. His body was later moved to Córdoba for another funeral, at which future Sufi mystic and philosopher ibn Arabi (1165–1240) was present.

== Works ==
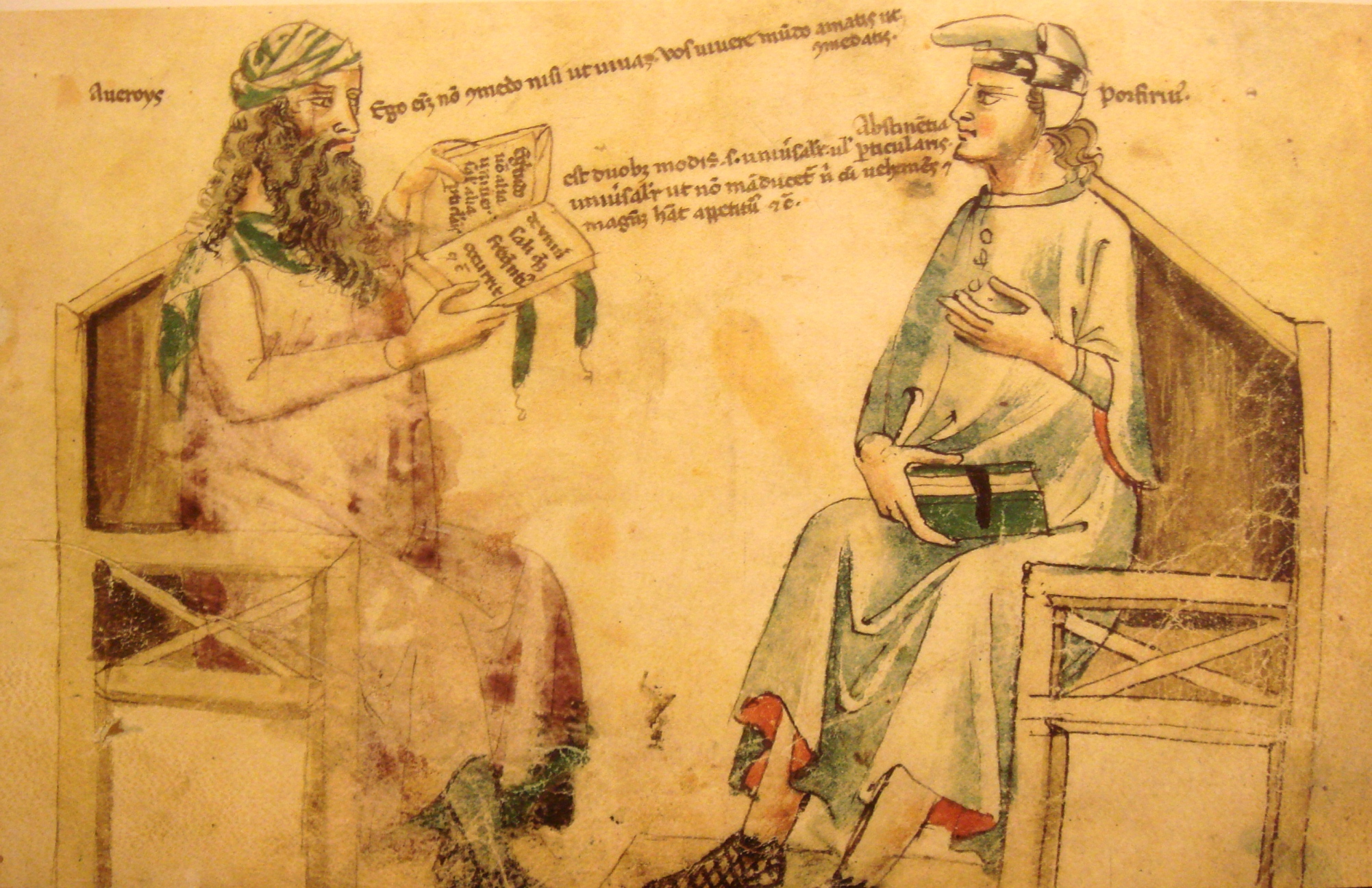
Imaginary debate between Averroes and third-century philosopher Porphyry. Monfredo de Monte Imperiali Liber de herbis, 14th century

Averroes was a prolific writer and his works, according to Fakhry, "covered a greater variety of subjects" than those of any of his predecessors in the East, including philosophy, medicine, jurisprudence or legal theory, and linguistics. Most of his writings were commentaries on or paraphrasings of the works of Aristotle that—especially the long ones—often contain his original thoughts. According to French author Ernest Renan, Averroes wrote at least 67 original works, including 28 works on philosophy, 20 on medicine, 8 on law, 5 on theology, and 4 on grammar, in addition to his commentaries on most of Aristotle's works and his commentary on Plato's The Republic. Many of Averroes's works in Arabic did not survive, but their translations into Hebrew or Latin did. For example, of his long commentaries on Aristotle, only "a tiny handful of Arabic manuscript remains".

=== Commentaries on Aristotle ===
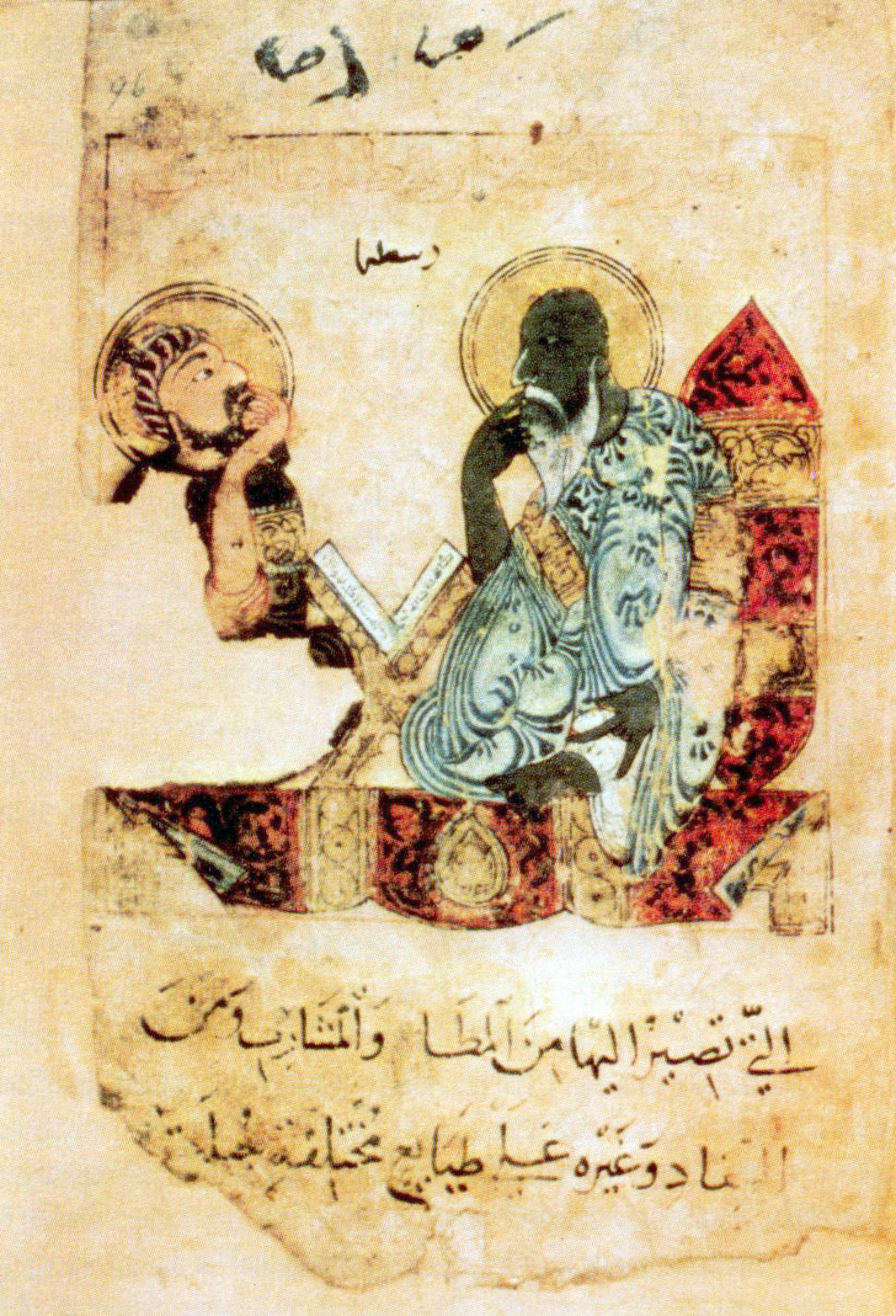
An Arabic illustration of Aristotle teaching a student, c. 1220. Aristotle's works are the subject of extensive commentaries by Averroes.

Averroes wrote commentaries on nearly all of Aristotle's surviving works. The only exception is Politics, which he did not have access to, so he wrote commentaries on Plato's Republic. He classified his commentaries into three categories that modern scholars have named short, middle and long commentaries. Most of the short commentaries (jami) were written early in his career and contain summaries of Aristotelian doctrines. The middle commentaries (talkhis) contain paraphrases that clarify and simplify Aristotle's original text. The middle commentaries were probably written in response to his patron caliph Abu Yaqub Yusuf's complaints about the difficulty of understanding Aristotle's original texts and to help others in a similar position. The long commentaries (tafsir or sharh), or line-by-line commentaries, include the complete text of the original works with a detailed analysis of each line. The long commentaries are very detailed and contain a high degree of original thought, and were unlikely to be intended for a general audience. Only five of Aristotle's works had all three types of commentaries: Physics, Metaphysics, On the Soul, On the Heavens, and Posterior Analytics.

=== Stand-alone philosophical works ===
Averroes also wrote stand-alone philosophical treatises, including On the Intellect, On the Syllogism, On Conjunction with the Active Intellect, On Time, On the Heavenly Sphere and On the Motion of the Sphere. He also wrote several polemics: Essay on al-Farabi's Approach to Logic, as Compared to that of Aristotle, Metaphysical Questions Dealt with in the Book of Healing by Ibn Sina, and Rebuttal of Ibn Sina's Classification of Existing Entities.

=== Islamic theology ===
Scholarly sources, including Fakhry and the Encyclopaedia of Islam, have named three works Averroes's critical writings in this area. Fasl al-Maqal ("The Decisive Treatise") is an 1178 treatise that argues for the compatibility of Islam and philosophy. Al-Kashf 'an Manahij al-Adillah ("Exposition of the Methods of Proof"), written in 1179, criticizes the theologies of the Ash'arites, and lays out Averroes's argument for proving the existence of God, as well as his thoughts on God's attributes and actions. The 1180 Tahafut at-Tahafut ("Incoherence of the Incoherence") is a rebuttal of al-Ghazali's (d. 1111) landmark criticism of philosophy The Incoherence of the Philosophers. It combines ideas in his commentaries and stand-alone works and uses them to respond to al-Ghazali. The work also criticizes Avicenna and his neoplatonist tendencies, sometimes agreeing with al-Ghazali's critique against him.

=== Medicine ===
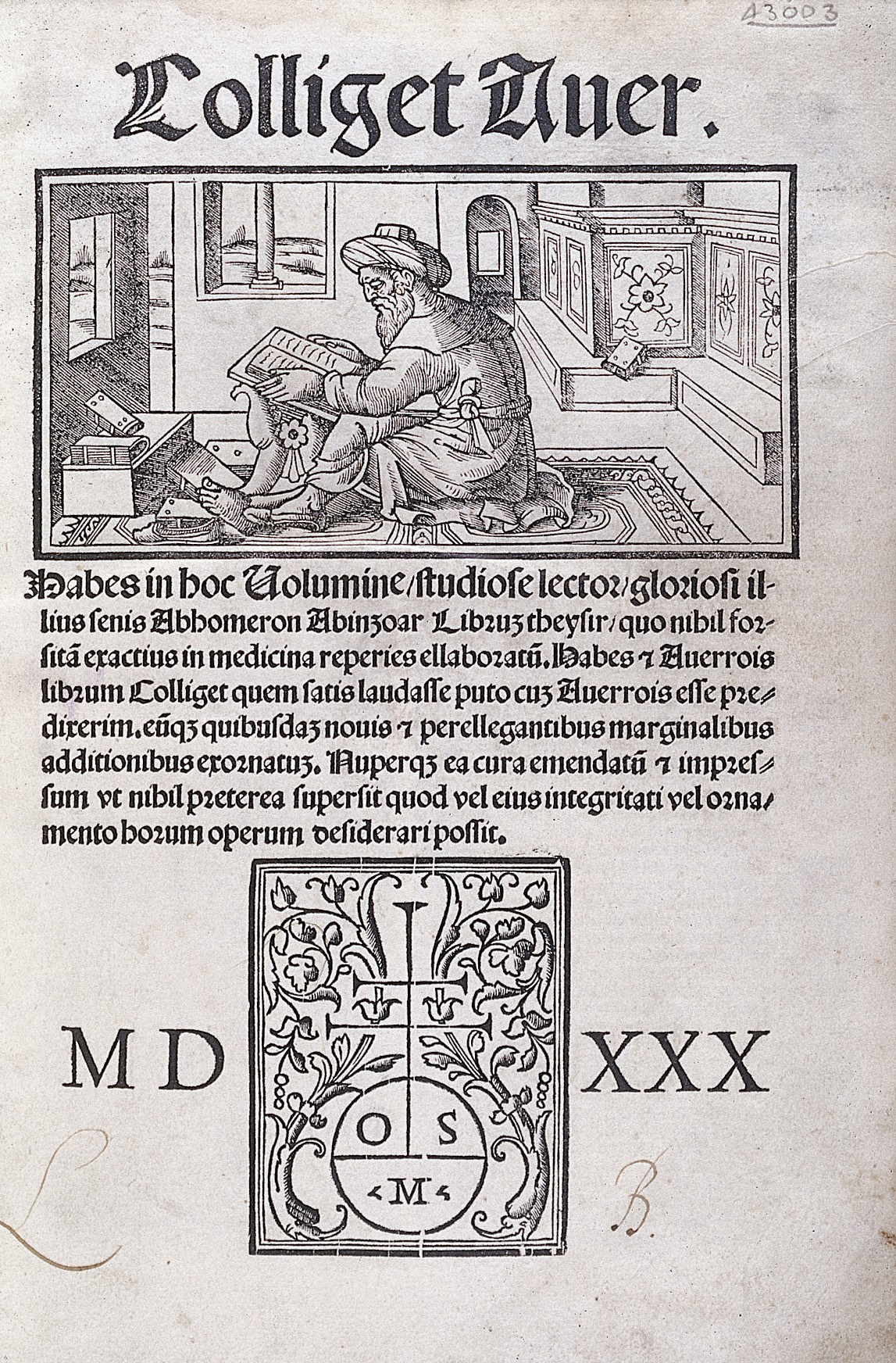
Title page from a Latin edition of Colliget, Averroes's main work in medicine

Averroes, who served as the royal physician at the Almohad court, wrote a number of medical treatises. The most famous was al-Kulliyat fi al-Tibb ("The General Principles of Medicine", Latinized in the west as the Colliget), written around 1162, before his appointment at court. The title of this book is the opposite of al-Juz'iyyat fi al-Tibb ("The Specificities of Medicine"), written by his friend Ibn Zuhr, and the two collaborated intending that their works complement each other. The Latin translation of the Colliget became a medical textbook in Europe for centuries. His other surviving titles include On Treacle, The Differences in Temperament, and Medicinal Herbs. He also wrote summaries of the works of Greek physician Galen (died c. 210) and a commentary on Avicenna's Urjuzah fi al-Tibb ("Poem on Medicine").

Averroes made pioneering observations. He identified the retina, rather than the lens, as the primary organ responsible for sensing light, a significant departure from prevailing theories of his time. Averroes provided early descriptions of conditions resembling Parkinson's disease and offered insights into stroke, attributing it to cerebral causes rather than peripheral obstructions.

=== Jurisprudence and law ===
Averroes served multiple tenures as judge and produced multiple works in the fields of Islamic jurisprudence or legal theory. The only book that survives today is Bidāyat al-Mujtahid wa Nihāyat al-Muqtaṣid ("Primer of the Discretionary Scholar"). In this work he explains the differences of opinion (ikhtilaf) between the Sunni madhhabs (schools of Islamic jurisprudence) both in practice and in their underlying juristic principles, as well as the reason why they are inevitable. Despite his status as a Maliki judge, the book also discusses the opinion of other schools, including liberal and conservative ones. Other than this surviving text, bibliographical information shows he wrote a summary of Al-Ghazali's On Legal Theory of Muslim Jurisprudence (Al-Mustasfa) and tracts on sacrifices and land tax.

== Philosophical ideas ==
=== Aristotelianism in the Islamic philosophical tradition ===
In his philosophical writings, Averroes attempted to return to Aristotelianism, which according to him had been distorted by the Neoplatonist tendencies of Muslim philosophers such as Al-Farabi and Avicenna. He rejected al-Farabi's attempt to merge the ideas of Plato and Aristotle, pointing out the differences between the two, such as Aristotle's rejection of Plato's theory of ideas. He also criticized Al-Farabi's works on logic for misinterpreting its Aristotelian source. He wrote an extensive critique of Avicenna, who was the standard-bearer of Islamic Neoplatonism in the Middle Ages. He argued that Avicenna's theory of emanation had many fallacies and was not found in the works of Aristotle. Averroes disagreed with Avicenna's view that existence is merely an accident added to essence, arguing the reverse; something exists per se and essence can only be found by subsequent abstraction. He also rejected Avicenna's modality and Avicenna's argument to prove the existence of God as the Necessary Existent. Averroes felt strongly about the incorporation of Greek thought into the Muslim world, and wrote that:

وإن كان غيرنا قد فحص عن ذلك فبين أنه يجب علينا أن نستعين على ما نحن بسبيله بما قاله من تقدمنا في ا في ذلك ، وسواء كان ( ذلك ) الغير مشاركا لنا أو غير مشارك في الملة

[If before us someone has inquired into [wisdom], it behooves us to seek help from what he has said. It is irrelevant whether he belongs to our community or to another.]

— On the Harmony of Religions and Philosophy

=== Relation between religion and philosophy ===
During Averroes's lifetime, philosophy came under attack from the Sunni tradition, especially from theological schools like the Hanbali school and the Ashʾarites. In particular, the Ashʾari scholar al-Ghazali (1058–1111) wrote The Incoherence of the Philosophers, a scathing and influential critique of the Neoplatonic philosophical tradition in the Islamic world and against the works of Avicenna in particular. Among others, Al-Ghazali charged philosophers with non-belief in Islam and sought to disprove the teaching of the philosophers using logical arguments.

In Decisive Treatise, Averroes argues that philosophy—which for him represented conclusions reached using reason and careful method—cannot contradict revelations in Islam because they are just two different methods of reaching the truth, and "truth cannot contradict truth". When conclusions reached by philosophy appear to contradict the text of the revelation, then according to Averroes, revelation must be subjected to interpretation or allegorical understanding to remove the contradiction. This interpretation must be done by those "rooted in knowledge"—a phrase taken from surah Āl Imrān 3:7 of the Quran, which for Averroes refers to philosophers who during his lifetime had access to the "highest methods of knowledge". He also argues that the Quran calls for Muslims to study philosophy because the study and reflection of nature would increase a person's knowledge of "the Artisan" (God). He quotes Quranic passages calling Muslims to reflect on nature. He uses them to render a fatwa that philosophy is allowed for Muslims and is probably an obligation, at least among those who have the talent for it.

Averroes also distinguishes between three modes of discourse: the rhetorical (based on persuasion) accessible to the common masses; the dialectical (based on debate) and often employed by theologians and the ulama (religious scholars); and the demonstrative (based on logical deduction). According to Averroes, the Quran uses the rhetorical method of inviting people to the truth, which allows it to reach the common masses with its persuasiveness, whereas philosophy uses the demonstrative methods that were only available to the learned but provided the best possible understanding and knowledge.

Averroes also tries to deflect Al-Ghazali's criticisms of philosophy by saying that many of them apply only to the philosophy of Avicenna and not to that of Aristotle, which Averroes argues to be the true philosophy from which Avicenna has deviated.

=== Nature of God ===
==== Existence ====
Averroes lays out his views on the existence and nature of God in the treatise The Exposition of the Methods of Proof. He examines and critiques the doctrines of four sects of Islam: the Asharites, the Mutazilites, the Sufis and those he calls the "literalists" (al-hashwiyah). Among other things, he examines their proofs of God's existence and critiques each one. Averroes argues that there are two arguments for God's existence that he deems logically sound and in accordance to the Quran; the arguments from "providence" and "from invention". The providence argument considers that the world and the universe seem finely tuned to support human life. Averroes cited the sun, the moon, the rivers, the seas and the location of humans on the earth. According to him, this suggests a creator who created them for the welfare of mankind. The argument from invention contends that worldly entities such as animals and plants appear to have been invented. Therefore, Averroes argues that a designer was behind the creation and that is God. Averroes's two arguments are teleological in nature and not cosmological like the arguments of Aristotle and most contemporaneous Muslim kalam theologians.

==== God's attributes ====
Averroes upholds the doctrine of divine unity (tawhid) and argues that God has seven divine attributes: knowledge, life, power, will, hearing, vision and speech. He devotes the most attention to the attribute of knowledge and argues that divine knowledge differs from human knowledge because God knows the universe because God is its cause while humans only know the universe through its effects.

Averroes argues that the attribute of life can be inferred because it is the precondition of knowledge and also because God willed objects into being. Power can be inferred by God's ability to bring creations into existence. Averroes also argues that knowledge and power inevitably give rise to speech. Regarding vision and speech, he says that because God created the world, he necessarily knows every part of it in the same way an artist understands his or her work intimately. Because two elements of the world are the visual and the auditory, God must necessarily possess vision and speech.

The omnipotence paradox was first addressed by Averroes and only later by Thomas Aquinas.

=== Pre-eternity of the world ===
In the centuries preceding Averroes, there had been a debate between Muslim thinkers questioning whether the world was created at a specific moment in time or whether it has always existed. Neo-Platonic philosophers such as Al-Farabi and Avicenna argued the world has always existed. This view was criticized by the mutakallimin (philosophers and theologians) of the Ashʾari tradition; in particular, al-Ghazali wrote an extensive refutation of the pre-eternity doctrine in his The Incoherence of the Philosophers and accused the Neoplatonists of unbelief (kufr).

Averroes responded to Al-Ghazali in his Incoherence of the Incoherence. He argued first that the differences between the two positions were not vast enough to warrant the charge of unbelief. He also said the pre-eternity doctrine did not necessarily contradict the Quran and cited verses that mention pre-existing "throne" and "water" in passages related to creation. Averroes argued that a careful reading of the Quran implied only the "form" of the universe was created in time but that its existence has been eternal. Averroes further criticized the mutakallimin for using their interpretations of scripture to answer questions that should have been left to philosophers.

=== Politics ===
Averroes states his political philosophy in his commentary of Plato's Republic. He combines his ideas with Plato's and with Islamic tradition; he considers the ideal state to be one based on the Islamic law (shariah). His interpretation of Plato's philosopher-king followed that of Al-Farabi, which equates the philosopher-king with the imam, caliph and lawgiver of the state. Averroes's description of the characteristics of a philosopher-king are similar to those given by Al-Farabi; they include love of knowledge, good memory, love of learning, love of truth, dislike for sensual pleasures, dislike for amassing wealth, magnanimity, courage, steadfastness, eloquence and the ability to "light quickly on the middle term". Averroes writes that if philosophers cannot rule—as was the case in the Almoravid and Almohad empires around his lifetime—philosophers must still try to influence the rulers towards implementing the ideal state.

According to Averroes, there are two methods of teaching virtue to citizens; persuasion and coercion. Persuasion is the more natural method consisting of rhetorical, dialectical and demonstrative methods; sometimes, however, coercion is necessary for those not amenable to persuasion, e.g. enemies of the state. Therefore, he justifies war as a last resort, which he also supports using Quranic arguments. Consequently, he argues that a ruler should have both wisdom and courage, which are needed for governance and defense of the state.

Like Plato, Averroes calls for women to share with men in the administration of the state, including participating as soldiers, philosophers and rulers. He regrets that contemporaneous Muslim societies limited the public role of women; he says this limitation is harmful to the state's well-being.

Averroes also accepted Plato's ideas of the deterioration of the ideal state. He cites examples from Islamic history when the Rashidun caliphate—which in Sunni tradition represented the ideal state led by "rightly guided caliphs"—became a dynastic state under Muawiyah, founder of the Umayyad dynasty. He also says the Almoravid and the Almohad empires started as ideal, shariah-based states but then deteriorated into timocracy, oligarchy, democracy and tyranny.

=== Diversity of Islamic law ===
In his tenure as judge and jurist, Averroes for the most part ruled and gave fatwas according to the Maliki school of Islamic law which was dominant in Al-Andalus and the western Islamic world during his time. However, he frequently acted as "his own man", including sometimes rejecting the "consensus of the people of Medina" argument that is one of the traditional Maliki position. In Bidāyat al-Mujtahid, one of his major contributions to the field of Islamic law, he not only describes the differences between various school of Islamic laws but also tries to theoretically explain the reasons for the difference and why they are inevitable. Even though all the schools of Islamic law are ultimately rooted in the Quran and hadith, there are "causes that necessitate differences" (al-asbab al-lati awjabat al-ikhtilaf). They include differences in interpreting scripture in a general or specific sense, in interpreting scriptural commands as obligatory or merely recommended, or prohibitions as discouragement or total prohibition, as well as ambiguities in the meaning of words or expressions. Averroes also writes that the application of qiyas (reasoning by analogy) could give rise to different legal opinion because jurists might disagree on the applicability of certain analogies and different analogies might contradict each other.

== Natural philosophy ==
=== Astronomy ===
As did Avempace and Ibn Tufail, Averroes criticizes the Ptolemaic system using philosophical arguments and rejects the use of eccentrics and epicycles to explain the apparent motions of the Moon, the Sun and the planets. He argued that those objects move uniformly in a strictly circular motion around the Earth, following Aristotelian principles. He postulates that there are three type of planetary motions; those that can be seen with the naked eye, those that require instruments to observe and those that can only be known by philosophical reasoning. Averroes argues that the occasional opaque colors of the Moon are caused by variations in its thickness; the thicker parts receive more light from the Sun—and therefore emit more light—than the thinner parts. This explanation was used up to the seventeenth century by the European Scholastics to account for Galileo's observations of spots on the Moon's surface, until the Scholastics such as Antoine Goudin in 1668 conceded that the observation was more likely caused by mountains on the Moon. He and Ibn Bajja observed sunspots, which they thought were transits of Venus and Mercury between the Sun and the Earth. In 1153 he conducted astronomical observations in Marrakesh, where he observed the star Canopus (Arabic: Suhayl) which was invisible in the latitude of his native Spain. He used this observation to support Aristotle's argument for the spherical Earth.

Averroes was aware that Arabic and Andalusian astronomers of his time focused on "mathematical" astronomy, which enabled accurate predictions through calculations but did not provide a detailed physical explanation of how the universe worked. According to him, "the astronomy of our time offers no truth, but only agrees with the calculations and not with what exists." He attempted to reform astronomy to be reconciled with physics, especially the physics of Aristotle. His long commentary of Aristotle's Metaphysics describes the principles of his attempted reform, but later in his life he declared that his attempts had failed. He confessed that he had not enough time or knowledge to reconcile the observed planetary motions with Aristotelian principles. In addition, he did not know the works of Eudoxus and Callippus, and so he missed the context of some of Aristotle's astronomical works. However, his works influenced astronomer Nur ad-Din al-Bitruji (d. 1204), who adopted most of his reform principles and did succeed in proposing an early astronomical system based on Aristotelian physics.

=== Physics ===
In physics, Averroes did not adopt the inductive method that was being developed by Al-Biruni in the Islamic world and is closer to today's physics. Rather, he was—in the words of historian of science Ruth Glasner—an "exegetical" scientist who produced new theses about nature through discussions of previous texts, especially the writings of Aristotle. because of this approach, he was often depicted as an unimaginative follower of Aristotle, but Glasner argues that Averroes's work introduced highly original theories of physics, especially his elaboration of Aristotle's minima naturalia and on motion as forma fluens, which were taken up in the west and are important to the overall development of physics.

=== Psychology ===
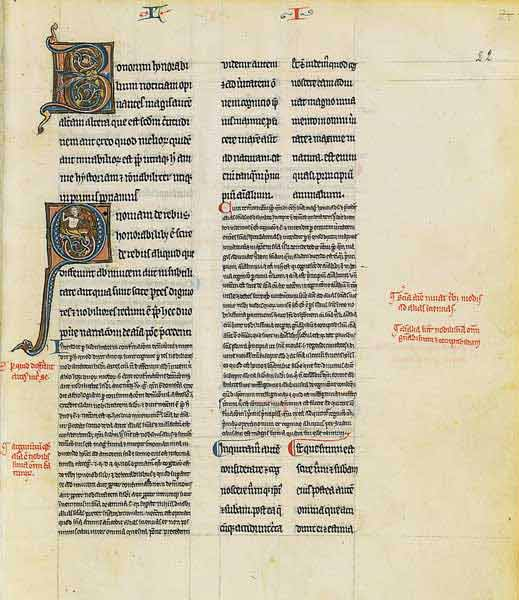
The Long Commentary on Aristotle's On the Soul, French Manuscript, third quarter of the 13th century

Averroes expounds his thoughts on psychology in his three commentaries on Aristotle's On the Soul. Averroes is interested in explaining the human intellect using philosophical methods and by interpreting Aristotle's ideas. His position on the topic changed throughout his career as his thoughts developed. In his short commentary, the first of the three works, Averroes follows Ibn Bajja's theory that something called the "material intellect" stores specific images that a person encounters. These images serve as basis for the "unification" by the universal "agent intellect", which, once it happens, allow a person to gain universal knowledge about that concept. In his middle commentary, Averroes moves towards the ideas of Al-Farabi and Avicenna, saying the agent intellect gives humans the power of universal understanding, which is the material intellect. Once the person has sufficient empirical encounters with a certain concept, the power activates and gives the person universal knowledge (see also logical induction).

In his last commentary—called the Long Commentary—he proposes another theory, which becomes known as the theory of "the unity of the intellect". In it, Averroes argues that there is only one material intellect, which is the same for all humans and is unmixed with human body. To explain how different individuals can have different thoughts, he uses a concept he calls fikr—known as cogitatio in Latin—a process that happens in human brains and contains not universal knowledge but "active consideration of particular things" the person has encountered. This theory attracted controversy when Averroes's works entered Christian Europe; in 1229 Thomas Aquinas wrote a detailed critique titled On the Unity of the Intellect against the Averroists.

=== Medicine ===
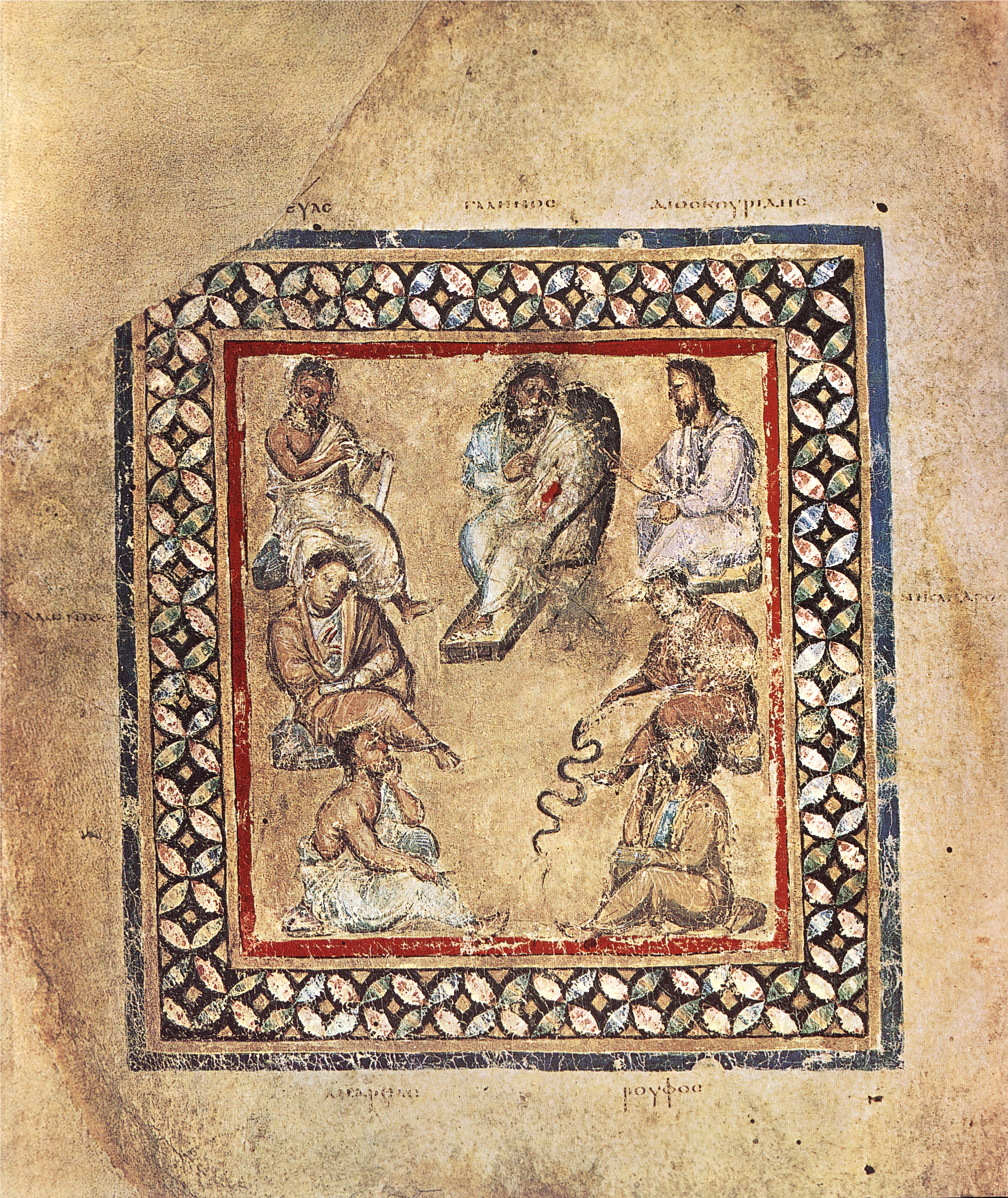
6th-century Byzantine depiction of Galen (top centre) among other noted physicians

While his works in medicine indicate an in-depth theoretical knowledge in medicine of his time, he likely had limited expertise as a practitioner, and declared in one of his works that he had not "practiced much apart from myself, my relatives or my friends." He did serve as a royal physician, but his qualification and education was mostly theoretical. For the most part, Averroes's medical work Al-Kulliyat fi al-Tibb follows the medical doctrine of Galen, an influential Greek physician and author from the second century, which was based on the four humors—blood, yellow bile, black bile, and phlegm, whose balance is necessary for the health of the human body. Averroes's original contributions include his observations on the retina: he might have been the first to recognize that the retina was the part of the eye responsible for sensing light, rather than the lens as was commonly thought. Modern scholars dispute whether this is what he meant in his Kulliyat, but Averroes also stated a similar observation in his commentary to Aristotle's Sense and Sensibilia: "the innermost of the coats of the eye [the retina] must necessarily receive the light from the humors of the eye [the lens], just like the humors receive the light from air."

Another of his departures from Galen and the medical theories of the time is his description of stroke as produced by the brain and caused by an obstruction of the arteries from the heart to the brain. This explanation is closer to the modern understanding of the disease compared to that of Galen, which attributes it to the obstruction between heart and the periphery. He was also the first to describe the signs and symptoms of Parkinson's disease in his Kulliyat, although he did not give the disease a name.

== Legacy ==
=== In Jewish tradition ===
Maimonides (d. 1204) was among early Jewish scholars who received Averroes's works enthusiastically, saying he "received lately everything Averroes had written on the works of Aristotle" and that Averroes "was extremely right". Thirteenth-century Jewish writers, including Samuel ibn Tibbon in his work Opinion of the Philosophers, Judah ben Solomon ha-Kohen in his Search for Wisdom and Shem-Tov ibn Falaquera, relied heavily on Averroes's texts. In 1232, Joseph Ibn Kaspi translated Averroes's commentaries on Aristotle's Organon; this was the first Jewish translation of a complete work. In 1260 Moses ibn Tibbon published the translation of almost all of Averroes's commentaries and some of his medical works. Jewish Averroism peaked in the fourteenth century; Jewish writers of this time who translated or were influenced by Averroes include Kalonymus ben Kalonymus of Arles, France, Todros Todrosi of Arles, Elia del Medigo of Candia and Gersonides of Languedoc.

Averroes was cited by Falaquera, Yehuda Moscato and Abraham Bibago to argue that the Greeks borrowed their scientific and philosophical knowledge from Jewish sources.

=== In Latin tradition ===
Averroes's main influence on the Christian West was through his extensive commentaries on Aristotle. After the fall of the Western Roman Empire, western Europe fell into a cultural decline that resulted in the loss of nearly all of the intellectual legacy of the Classical Greek scholars, including Aristotle. Averroes's commentaries, which were translated into Latin and entered western Europe in the thirteenth century, provided an expert account of Aristotle's legacy and made them available again. The influence of his commentaries led to Averroes being referred to simply as "The Commentator" rather than by name in Latin Christian writings. He has been sometimes described as the "father of free thought and unbelief" and "father of rationalism".

Michael Scot (1175 – c. 1232) was the first Latin translator of Averroes who translated the long commentaries of Physics, Metaphysics, On the Soul and On the Heavens, as well as multiple middle and short commentaries, starting in 1217 in Paris and Toledo. Following this, European authors such as Hermannus Alemannus, William de Luna and Armengaud of Montpellier translated Averroes's other works, sometimes with help from Jewish authors. Soon after, Averroes's works propagated among Christian scholars in the scholastic tradition. His writing attracted a strong circle of followers known as the Latin Averroists. Paris and Padua were major centers of Latin Averroism, and its prominent thirteenth-century leaders included Siger of Brabant and Boethius of Dacia.

Authorities of the Roman Catholic Church reacted against the spread of Averroism. In 1270, the Bishop of Paris Étienne Tempier issued a condemnation against 15 doctrines—many of which were Aristotelian or Averroist—that he said were in conflict with the doctrines of the church. In 1277, at the request of Pope John XXI, Tempier issued another condemnation, this time targeting 219 theses drawn from many sources, mainly the teachings of Aristotle and Averroes.

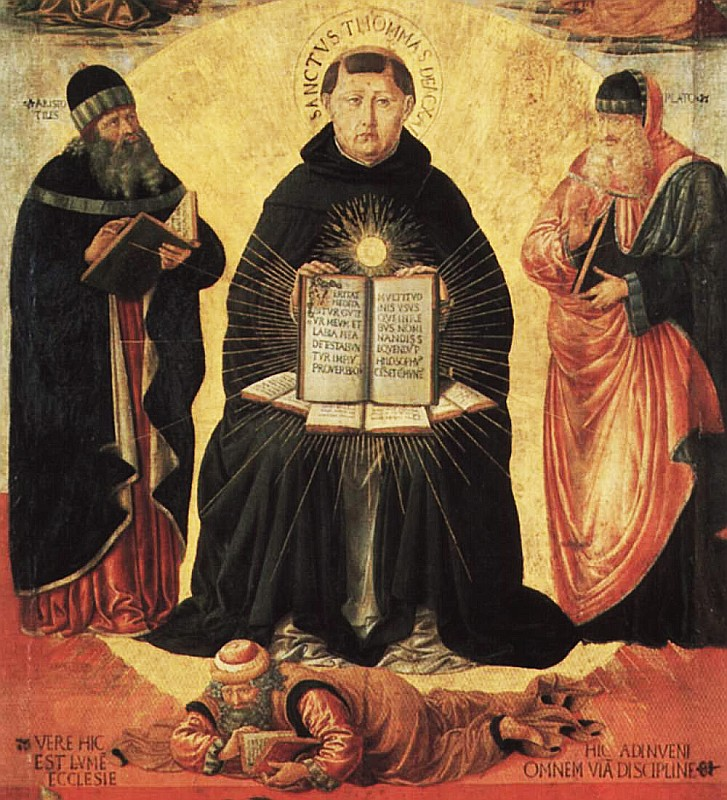
The Triumph of Saint Thomas Aquinas over Averroes by Benozzo Gozzoli, depicting Aquinas (top center), a major Averroes critic, "triumphing" over Averroes (bottom), depicted at the feet of Aquinas

Averroes received a mixed reception from other Catholic thinkers; Thomas Aquinas, a leading Catholic thinker of the thirteenth century, relied extensively on Averroes's interpretation of Aristotle but disagreed with him on many points. For example, he wrote a detailed attack on Averroes's theory that all humans share the same intellect. He also opposed Averroes on the eternity of the universe and divine providence. Ramon Llull opposed Averroism and established a distinction between a religion that could be tolerated—Islam—and a philosophy that should be opposed—Averroism, especially in its Latin version.

The Catholic Church's condemnations of 1270 and 1277, and the detailed critique by Aquinas weakened the spread of Averroism in Latin Christendom, though it maintained a following until the sixteenth century, when European thought began to diverge from Aristotelianism. Leading Averroists in the following centuries included John of Jandun and Marsilius of Padua (fourteenth century), Gaetano da Thiene and Pietro Pomponazzi (fifteenth century), and Agostino Nifo and Marcantonio Zimara (sixteenth century).

=== In Islamic tradition ===
Averroes had no major influence on Islamic philosophic thought until modern times. Part of the reason was geography; Averroes lived in Spain, the extreme west of the Islamic civilization far from the centers of Islamic intellectual traditions. Also, his philosophy may not have appealed to Islamic scholars of his time. His focus on Aristotle's works was outdated in the twelfth-century Muslim world, which had already scrutinized Aristotle since the ninth century and by now was engaging deeply with newer schools of thought, especially that of Avicenna. In the nineteenth century, Muslim thinkers began to engage with the works of Averroes again. By this time, there was a cultural renaissance called Al-Nahda ("reawakening") in the Arabic-speaking world and the works of Averroes were seen as inspiration to modernize the Muslim intellectual tradition.

== Cultural references ==
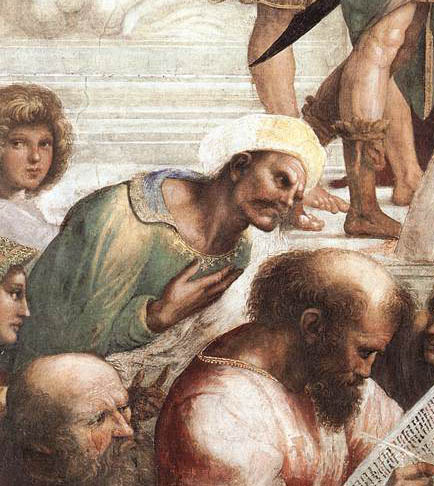
Averroes, detail of the fresco The School of Athens by Raphael

References to Averroes appear in the popular culture of both the western and Muslim world. The poem The Divine Comedy by the Italian writer Dante Alighieri, completed in 1320, depicts Averroes, "who made the Great Commentary", along with other non-Christian Greek and Muslim thinkers, in the first circle of hell around Saladin. The prologue of The Canterbury Tales (1387) by Geoffrey Chaucer lists Averroes among other medical authorities known in Europe at the time. Averroes is depicted in Raphael's 1501 fresco The School of Athens that decorates the Apostolic Palace in the Vatican, which features seminal figures of philosophy. In the painting, Averroes wears a green robe and a turban, and peers out from behind Pythagoras, who is shown writing a book.

Averroes is referenced briefly in Victor Hugo's The Hunchback of Notre-Dame (written 1831, but set in the Paris of 1482). The novel's villain, the Priest Claude Frollo, extols Averroes's talents as an alchemist in his obsessive quest to find the Philosophers Stone.

A 1947 short story by Jorge Luis Borges, "Averroes's Search" (Spanish: La Busca de Averroes), features his attempts to understand Aristotle's Poetics within a culture that lacks a tradition of live theatrical performance. In the afterwords of the story, Borges comments, "I felt that [the story] mocked me, foiled me, thwarted me. I felt that Averroës, trying to imagine what a play is without ever having suspected what a theater is, was no more absurd than I, trying to imagine Averroës yet with no more material than a few snatches from Renan, Lane, and Asín Palacios." Averroes is also the hero of the 1997 Egyptian movie Destiny by Youssef Chahine, made partly in commemoration of the 800th anniversary of his death. The plant genus Averrhoa (whose members include the starfruit and the bilimbi), the lunar crater ibn Rushd, and the asteroid 8318 Averroes are named after him.

Mael Malihabadi's 1957 Urdu historical fiction novel Falsafi ibn-e Rushd revolves around his life.

== Bibliography ==
- al-Aqqad, Abbas Mahmoud (2014) [1953]. Ibn Rushd (in Arabic). Cairo: Hindawi Foundation.
- al-Jabri, Mohammed Abed (1998). Ibn Rushd: Sira wa Fikr (in Arabic). Beirut: Markaz Dirasat al-Wahda al-Arabiyya.
- al-Marrakushi, 'Abd al-Wahid (2006). Al-Mu'jib fi Talkhis Akhbar al-Maghrib (in Arabic). Beirut: Dar al-Kutub al-Ilmiyyah.
- Foudeh, Saeed (2009). Mawqif Ibn Rushd al-Falsafi min 'Ilm al-Kalam (in Arabic). Amman: Dar al-Fath.
- Adamson, Peter (2016). Philosophy in the Islamic World: A History of Philosophy Without Any Gaps. Oxford University Press. ISBN 978-0199577491.
- Agutter, Paul S.; Wheatley, Denys N. (2008). Thinking about Life: The history and philosophy of biology and other sciences. Springer Science & Business Media. ISBN 978-1402088667.
- Ahmad, Jamil (1994). "Averroes". Renaissance. 4 (9). Lahore: Al-Mawrid. ISSN 1605-0045.
- Ariew, Roger (2011). Descartes Among the Scholastics. Brill. ISBN 978-9004207240.
- Arnaldez, Roger (1986). "Ibn Rushd". In B. Lewis; V.L. Menage; Ch. Pellat; J. Schacht (eds.). The Encyclopaedia of Islam. Vol. III: H-Iram. Leiden and London: Brill and Luzac & co. pp. 909–920. doi:10.1163/1573-3912_islam_COM_0340. ISBN 978-9004081185.
- Arnaldez, Roger (2000) [1998]. Averroes: A Rationalist in Islam. Translated by David Streight. University of Notre Dame Press. ISBN 0268020086.
- Ben-Menahem, Yemima (2017). "Borges on Replication and Concept Formation". In Ayelet Shavit; Aaron M. Ellison (eds.). Stepping in the Same River Twice: Replication in Biological Research. Yale University Press. pp. 23–36. ISBN 978-0300228038.
- Chandelier, Joël (2018). "Averroes on Medicine". In Peter Adamson; Matteo Di Giovanni (eds.). Interpreting Averroes. Cambridge University Press. pp. 158–176. doi:10.1017/9781316335543.010. ISBN 978-1316335543.
- Belen, Deniz; Bolay, Hayrunnisa (2009). "Averroës in The school of Athens: a Renaissance man and his contribution to Western thought and neuroscience". Neurosurgery. 64 (2). Oxford University Press: 374–381. doi:10.1227/01.NEU.0000338262.42326.A1. ISSN 1524-4040. PMID 19190465.
- Dutton, Yasin (1994). "The Introduction to Ibn Rushd's "Bidāyat al-Mujtahid"". Islamic Law and Society. 1 (2): 188–205. doi:10.2307/3399333. JSTOR 3399333.
- Fakhry, Majid (2001), Averroes (Ibn Rushd) His Life, Works and Influence, Oneworld Publications, ISBN 978-1851682690
- Forcada, Miquel (2007). "Ibn Rushd: Abū al-Walīd Muḥammad ibn Aḥmad ibn Muḥammad ibn Rushd al-Ḥafīd". In Thomas Hockey; et al. (eds.). The Biographical Encyclopedia of Astronomers, Springer Reference. New York: Springer. pp. 564–565.
- Glasner, Ruth (2009). Averroes' Physics: A Turning Point in Medieval Natural Philosophy. Oxford University Press. ISBN 978-0199567737.
- Guessoum, Nidhal (2011). Islam's Quantum Question: Reconciling Muslim Tradition and Modern Science. I.B. Tauris. ISBN 978-1848855182.
- Hasse, Dag Nikolaus (2014). "Influence of Arabic and Islamic Philosophy on the Latin West". In Edward N. Zalta (ed.). The Stanford Encyclopedia of Philosophy. Metaphysics Research Lab, Stanford University.
- Hillier, H. Chad. "Ibn Rushd (Averroes) (1126–1198)". Internet Encyclopedia of Philosophy. ISSN 2161-0002.
- Iskandar, Albert Z. (2008). "Ibn Rushd (Averroës)". In Helaine Selin (ed.). Encyclopaedia of the History of Science, Technology, and Medicine in Non-Western Cultures. New York: Springer. pp. 1115–1117. doi:10.1007/978-1-4020-4425-0_9240. ISBN 978-1402045592.
- Leaman, Olivier (2002), An Introduction to Classical Islamic Philosophy (2nd ed.), Cambridge University Press, ISBN 978-0521797573
- McGinnis, Jon; Reisman, David C. (2007). Classical Arabic Philosophy: An Anthology of Sources. Hackett Publishing. ISBN 978-1603843928.
- Renan, Ernest (1882). Averroès et l'Averroïsme: Essai Historique (in French). Calmann-Lévy.
- Sonneborn, Liz (2006). Averroes (Ibn Rushd): Muslim Scholar, Philosopher, and Physician of the Twelfth Century. The Rosen Publishing Group. ISBN 978-1404205147.
- Taylor, Richard C. (2005). "Averroes: religious dialectic and Aristotelian philosophical thought". In Peter Adamson; Richard C. Taylor (eds.). The Cambridge Companion to Arabic Philosophy. Cambridge University Press. pp. 180–200. ISBN 978-0521520690.
- Vernet, Juan; Samsó, Julio (1996). "The development of Arabic science in Andalusia". In Roshdi Rashed (ed.). Encyclopedia of the History of Arabic Science. Routledge. pp. 243–275. OCLC 912501823.
- Wohlman, Avital (2009). Al-Ghazali, Averroes and the Interpretation of the Qur'an: Common Sense and Philosophy in Islam. Routledge. ISBN 978-1135224448.
- Rosenthal, Erwin I.J. (26 December 2017). "Averroës". Encyclopædia Britannica. Encyclopædia Britannica, inc.
