= Abraham Bedersi =

French poet

Abraham Bedersi (Hebrew: אברהם בדרשי) was a Languedoc Jewish poet; he was born in Béziers (whence his surname Bedersi, or native of Béziers). The dates of his birth and death have not been ascertained.

An elegy which he composed during his youth, upon the Confiscation of the Books of the Law, is supposed by some scholars to refer to the burning of the Talmud in Paris about the year 1242; by others, to the confiscation of the Talmud in Aragon in 1264, as the direct result of the Barcelona controversy. If the latter view is correct, Bedersi may well have flourished about the year 1240 (Leopold Zunz, Z.G., p. 413).

As appears from the letter sent by Bedersi to Don Vidal Solomon (Ḥotam Toknit, p. 4), he went early (perhaps in 1273) to Perpignan, where he attended the lectures of Joseph Ezubi. He returned often to Perpignan and took an active part in its communal affairs. A number of his letters, contained in MS. cviii (72) of the Vienna Hofbibliothek, are written to prominent Jews in Barcelona, asking them to aid their less fortunate coreligionists.

At one time he lived at Arles, and in 1285, during the war of France with Roussillon, he took refuge in Narbonne. He seems at one time to have been rich, for in a poem he declares that he is independent and writes for his own pleasure. The compiler of his diwan relates that Bedersi sent money to the wandering poet Gorni (Luzzatto, Intro. to Ḥotam Toknit, p. 4).

Bedersi was a prolific writer. Several collections of his poems are still extant in manuscript in various libraries. The most complete manuscript is that in the British Library, Add MS 27168. This contains an elegy on the death of his relative, David of Cabestan; several poems and letters addressed to Todros Abulafia and his companion, Abu al-Ḥasan Saul; poems dedicated to the physician of the king of Castile, Abu al-Ḥasan Meïr ibn al-Ḥarit; and the elegy mentioned above.

Two of Bedersi's works were published, with an interesting introduction by Luzzatto, by G. Polak, Amsterdam, 1862:

- Ḥereb ha-Mithapeket (A Revolving Sword), a poem of 210 strophes, according to the numerical value of the word = 8 + 200 + 2. The author in this poem gives a brief account of Jewish poetry, the decadence of which he deplores. He praises the makamat (poems) of Al-Hariri of Basra, which he probably knew through the translation of several by Al-Ḥarizi
- Ḥotem Toknit (Who Seals the Sum; compare Ezek. xxviii.12), a treatise on Hebrew synonyms.

Another poetical work, entitled Bakashat ha-Lamedin, published at Frankfort-on-the-Oder, in 1812, was attributed to Abraham Bedersi; but it is probable that this poem was written by his son Jedaiah Bedersi.

Bedersi's works show the decadence of Jewish poetry at that time. His style is stiff and unintelligible, though he possessed a thorough knowledge of Hebrew.
