= Hildebrand (surname) =

Hildebrand is a surname, and may refer to:

- Adolf von Hildebrand (1847–1921), German sculptor
- Alice von Hildebrand (1923–2022), Belgian philosopher and theologian
- Billy Hildebrand (1924–1992), American football player and coach
- Brian Hildebrand (1962–1999), American wrestling manager
- Brianna Hildebrand (born 1996), American actress
- Bror Emil Hildebrand (1806–1884) Swedish archaeologist, numismatist and museum director
- Bruno Hildebrand (1812–1878), German economist
- Dan Hildebrand, American actor
- David K. Hildebrand, scholar on American music history
- Dietrich von Hildebrand (1889–1977), German Catholic philosopher and theologian
- Francis B. Hildebrand (1915–2002), American mathematician
- Friedrich Hermann Gustav Hildebrand (1835–1915), German botanist
- George Hildebrand (1878–1960), American baseball player
- Gerhard Hildebrand (1877–unknown), German journalist and politician
- Gert Hildebrand (born 1953), German car designer
- Grant Hildebrand, American architect and architectural historian
- Hans Hildebrand (1824–1913) Swedish archaeologist
- Henry Hildebrand (1911–2006), Canadian religious educator
- Hilde Hildebrand (1897–1976), German actress
- Ike Hildebrand (1927–2006), Canadian ice hockey and lacrosse player
- J. B. Hildebrand, American football coach
- Jeffery Hildebrand, American businessman
- Joe Hildebrand (born 1976), Australian journalist
- Joel Henry Hildebrand (1881–1983), American educator and pioneer chemist
- Johann Hildebrand (1614–1684), German composer, organist, and poet
- J. R. Hildebrand, American race car driver
- Josef Hildebrand (1895–unknown), Czech fencer
- Jürgen Hildebrand (born 1948), German handball player
- Klaus Hildebrand (born 1941), German historian
- Lloyd Hildebrand (1870–1924), British racing cyclist
- Louis Hildebrand, French cyclist
- Madison Hildebrand (born 1980), American realtor and media personality
- Martín von Hildebrand (born 1943), American-Colombian ethnologist
- Nadine Hildebrand (born 1987), German track and field athlete
- Oral Hildebrand (1907–1977), American baseball player
- Palmer Hildebrand (1884–1960), American baseball player
- Peter E. Hildebrand, American agricultural economist
- Philipp Hildebrand (born 1963), Swiss banker
- Ray Hildebrand (1940–2023), member of the American duo Paul & Paula
- Rudolf Hildebrand (1824–1894), German scholar
- Samuel F. Hildebrand (1883–1949), American ichthyologist
- Sara Hildebrand (born 1979), American platform diver
- Sarah Hildebrand (born 1990), Malaysian former model, actress, television host
- Timo Hildebrand (born 1979), German football player

== See also ==
- Hildebrand (disambiguation)
- Hildebrandt (disambiguation)
