= Hildebrand (disambiguation) =

Hildebrand may refer to:

== People ==
People with Hildebrand as a given name:

- Hildebrand, a character from Germanic legend
- Hildebrand (bishop of Sées), flourished 849–84
- Aldebrandus, (1119 – 1219), Bishop of Fossombrone and saint
- Pope Gregory VII (né Hildebrand; c.1020 – 1085), Pope from 1073 to 1085
- Hildebrand, a pen name for Nicolaas Beets (1814 – 1903)
- Childebrand I, born c.678, Frankish duke
- Hildeprand, born c.700, King of the Lombards
- Hildeprand of Spoleto, duke from 774 to 789
- Hildebrand Elwell, English politician
- Hildebrand Veckinchusen (d. 1426), German merchant

People with the surname Hildebrand:

- Hildebrand (surname)

== Other ==
- The Hildebrand Rarity, a James Bond short story by Ian Fleming
- Hildebrand solubility parameter for predicting solubilities, especially of polymers
- Old Hildebrand, a German fairy tale collected by the Brothers Grimm

== See also ==
- Hildebrandt (disambiguation)
- Hildenbrand (disambiguation)
- Harvey Hilderbran, American politician
