= 2003 Israeli chief rabbi elections =

- 14 April 2003
- Sefardi Chief Rabbi
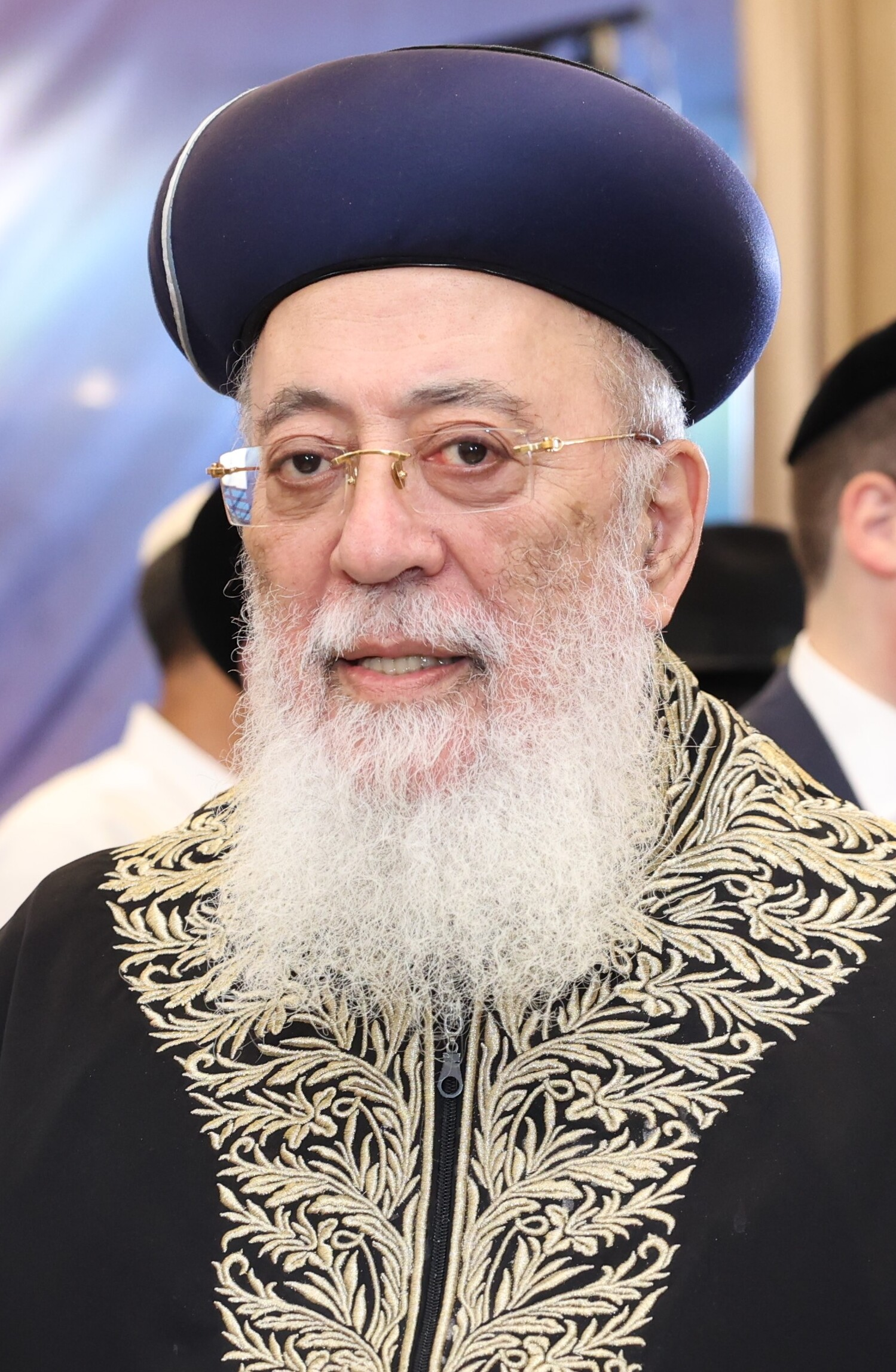

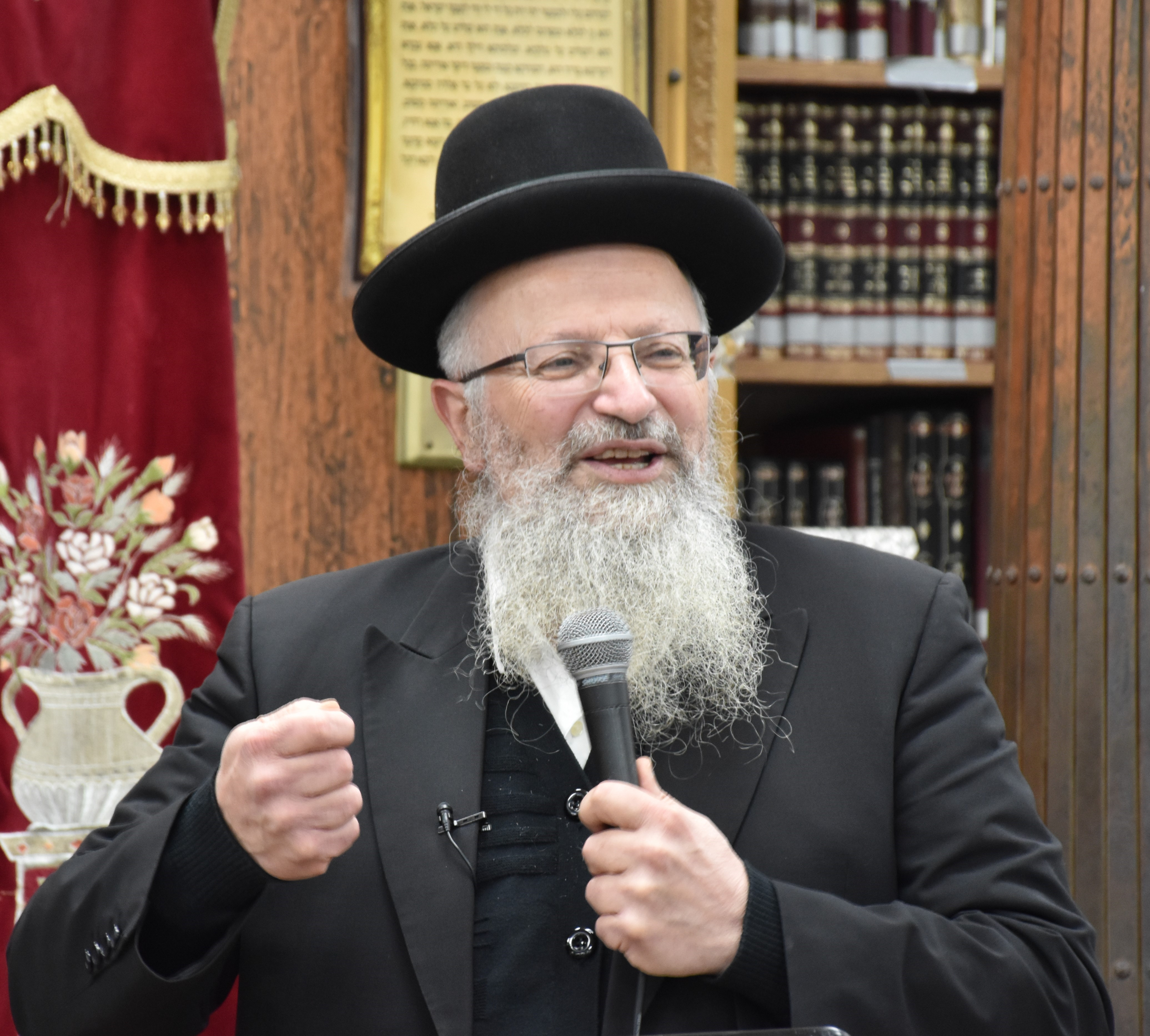

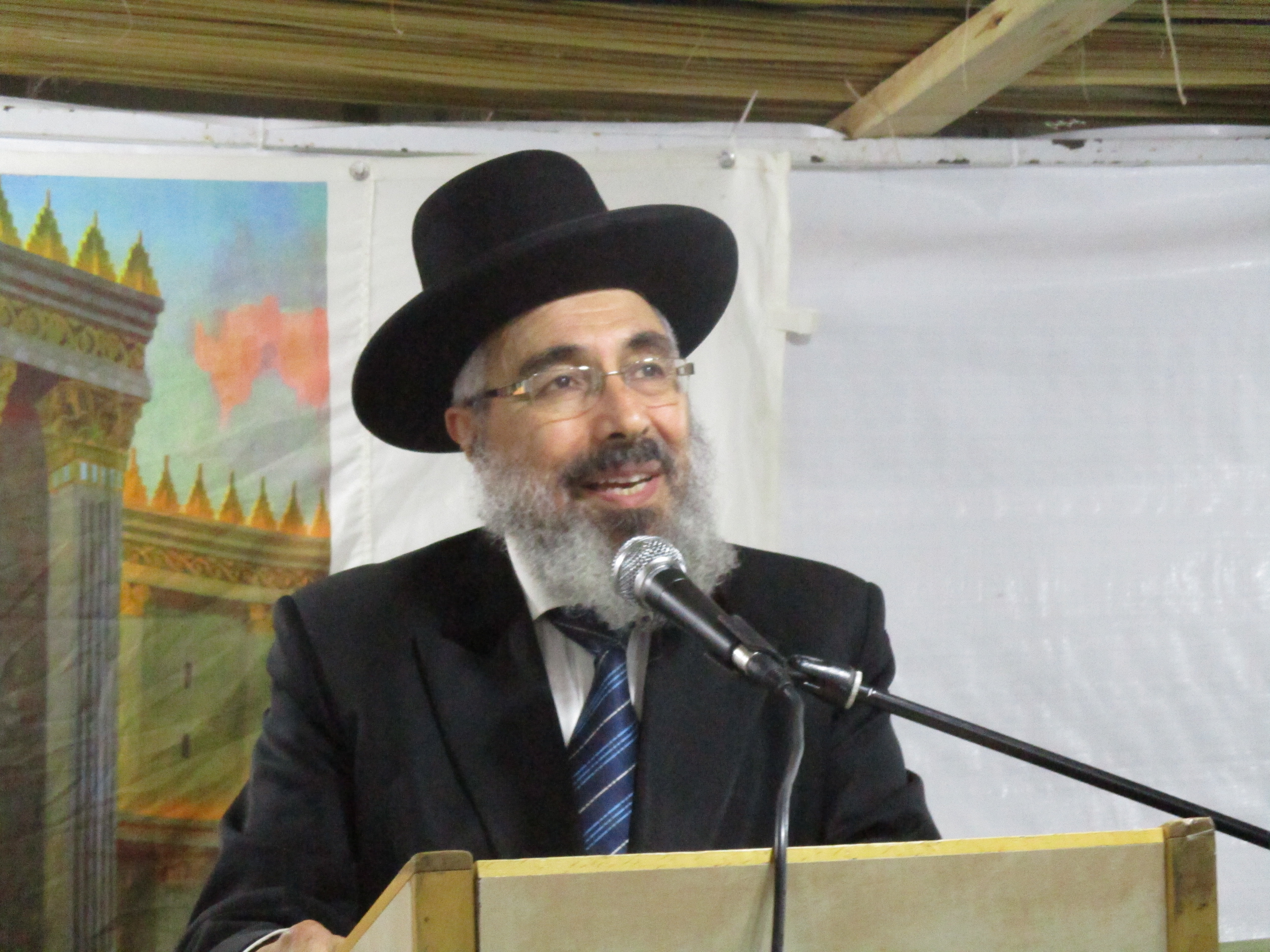

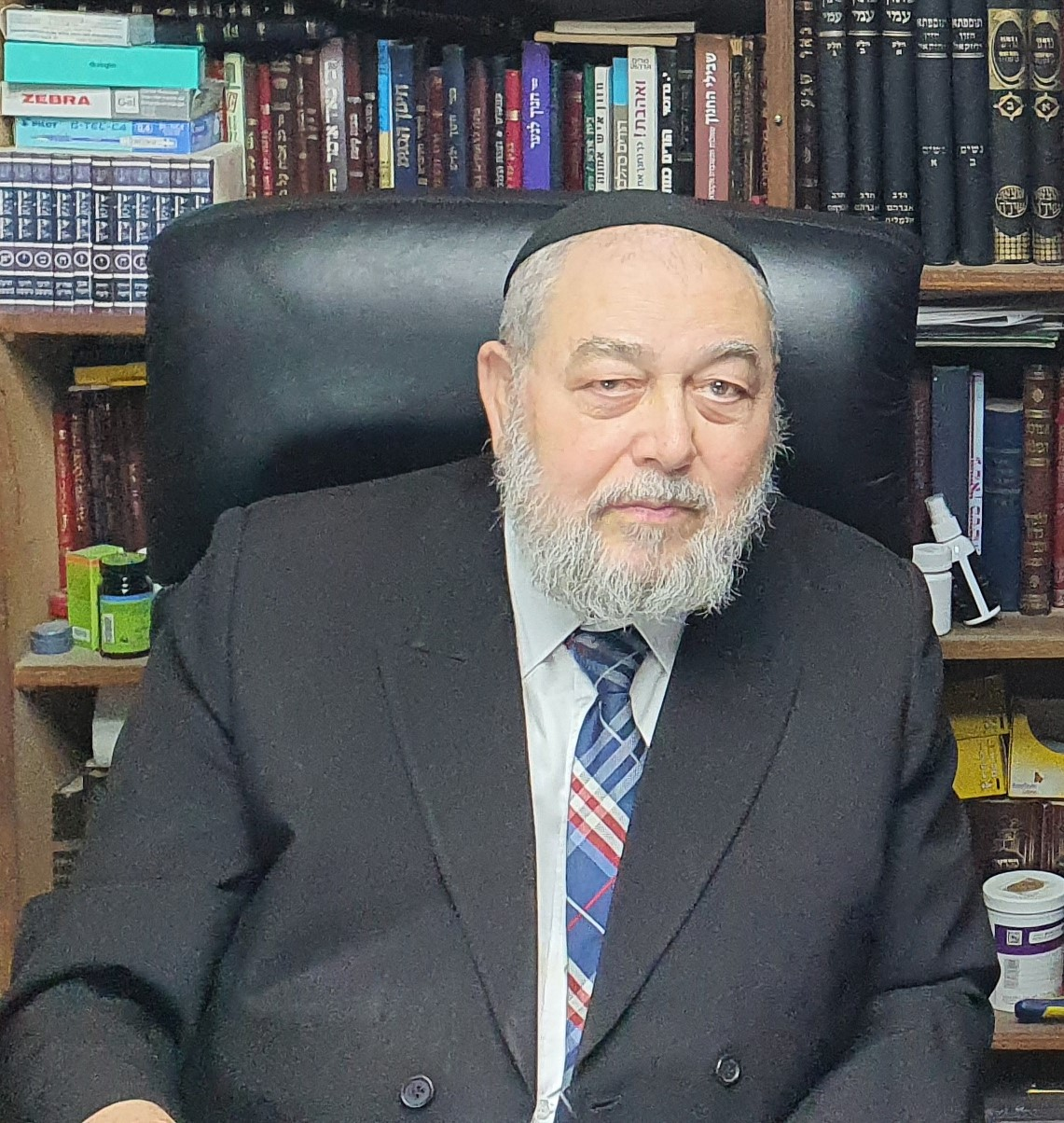
Candidate	Shlomo Amar	Shmuel Eliyahu
Popular vote	124	14
Candidate	Ratzon Arusi	Eliyahu Abragel
Popular vote	4	3
- Ashkenazi Chief Rabbi
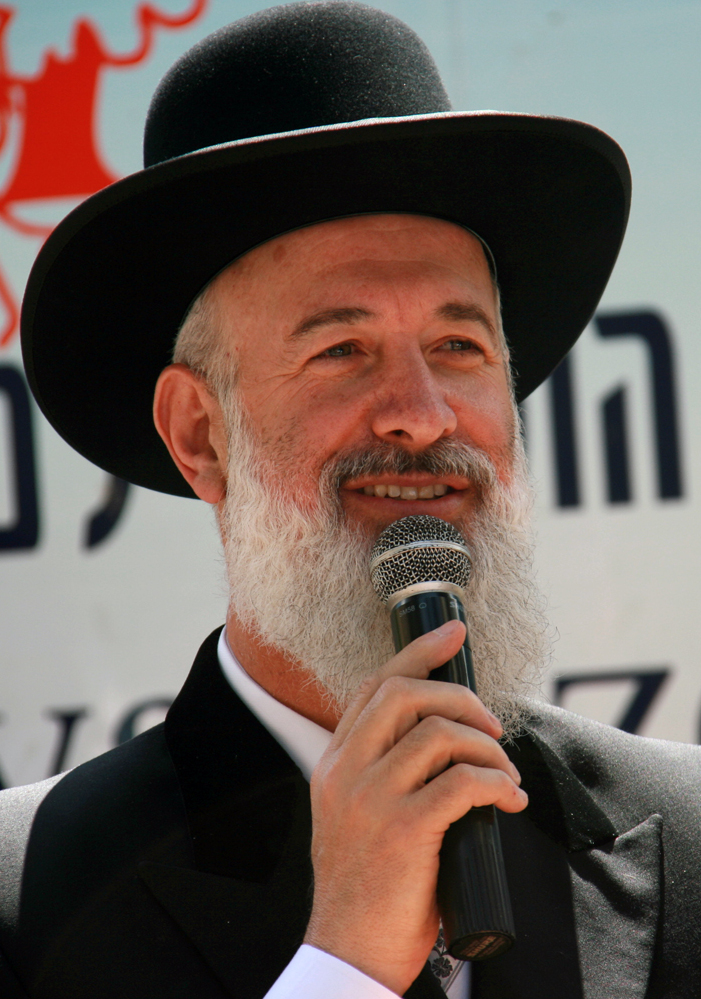

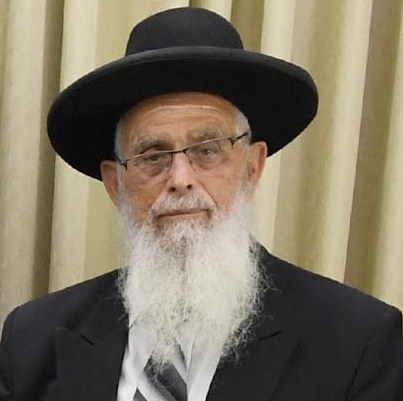

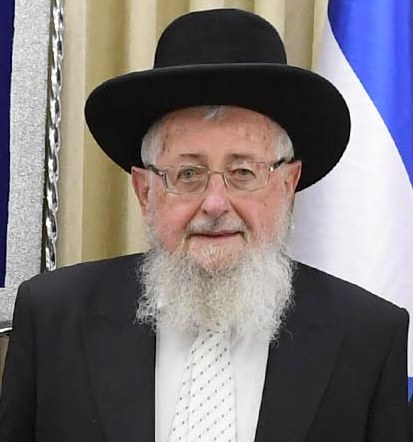
Candidate	Yona Metzger	Yaakov Ariel	Shlomo Dichovsky
Popular vote	63	56	20

Elections for the Chief Rabbinate of Israel were held on April 14, 2003 (28 Adar 2, 5763 - Hebrew calendar). Rabbi Shlomo Moshe Amar and Rabbi Yona Metzger were elected.

== Background ==
Originally, the position of Chief Rabbi of Israel was a life-long appointment. After the passing of Rabbi Yitzhak Herzog, the term was limited to a 10-year term. Over the years, age limits and reelection for additional terms has been restricted.

There are two chief rabbis that server in Israel simultaneously, with two separate and simultaneous elections: one for the Sefardic Chief Rabbi, and one for the Ashkenazi Chief Rabbi.

The electorate for Israel's Chief Rabbinate is composed of 150 members: 80 rabbis who hold official positions and 70 public figures including Knesset members, local authority heads, and religious council heads.

== Campaign ==
The candidates for the Sephardic rabbi position were: Rabbi Shlomo Moshe Amar, rabbi of Tel Aviv; and Rabbi Shmuel Eliyahu, rabbi of Safed. Rabbi Amar was endorsed by Rabbi Ovadia Yosef and the Shas party, while the Nationalist Movement Party supported Rabbi Eliyahu, who was the son of Rabbi Mordechai Eliyahu, whom the Nationalist Movement Party considered one of its spiritual leaders.

The candidates for the position of Ashkenazi rabbi were: Rabbi Yaakov Ariel, the rabbi of Ramat Gan, who was supported by the National Religious Council; and Rabbi Yona Metzger, the rabbi of North Tel Aviv. Rabbi Yosef Shalom Elyashiv, the spiritual leader of Degel Hatorah, endorsed Rabbi Metzger's candidacy.

Religious public figures claimed that Rabbi Elyashiv supported the Metzger's candidacy in order to damage the status of the Chief Rabbinate. Those close to Rabbi Elyashiv said that he did this to torpedo the sale permit and because, in his opinion, no more suitable candidate was on the agenda at the time. It was also claimed that he was also helped by the fact that he was the brother-in-law of Nati Grossman. The circumstances of his election aroused resentment among many in the national religious community. After his conviction, religious journalists returned and pointed the finger of accusation at the ultra-Orthodox activism that led to his election over the Rabbi Ariel.

In a joint political 'deal', Shas supported the candidacy of Rabbi Metzger and in return, United Torah Judaism supported the candidacy of Rabbi Amar, which led to the election of both candidates.
