= Hildebrandt =

Hildebrandt is a German surname. Notable people with the surname include:

- The Brothers Hildebrandt (Greg and Tim Hildebrandt) (b. 1939), twin brothers, comic book and fantasy artists
- Kristine Hildebrandt, American professor of linguistics
- Christian Hildebrandt (born 1967), Danish composer
- Dieter Hildebrandt (1927–2013), German cabaret artist
- Edmund Hildebrandt (1872–1939), German art historian
- Eduard Hildebrandt (1818–1868), German artist
- Ernst-Albrecht Hildebrandt (1895–1970), Nazi SS-Oberführer, and SS and Police Leader
- Franz Hildebrandt (1909-1985), German Theologian
- Fred H. Hildebrandt (1874–1956), American politician; U.S. representative from South Dakota
- Friedhelm Hildebrandt (b. 1957), German Geneticist and Pediatrician
- Friedrich Hildebrandt (1898–1948), German SS Obergruppenführer, a Gauleiter, and executed for war crimes
- Georg Friedrich Hildebrandt (1764–1816), German pharmacist, chemist, and anatomist
- Gregor Hildebrandt (born 1974), German artist
- Heinz Hildebrandt (b. 1943), German politician
- Henry Hildebrandt (b. 1963), Canadian religious leader
- Jodi Hildebrandt (born 1969), American former counselor, aggravated child abuser
- Johann Lukas von Hildebrandt (1668–1745), Austrian architect; designer of palaces
- Johann Maria Hildebrandt, (1847–1881), German explorer and collector
- Johann Hildebrandt (disambiguation)
- Johanne Hildebrandt (b. 1964), Swedish author and journalist
- Jürgen Hildebrandt (b. 1948), German handball player and trainer
- Martha Hildebrandt (1925–2022), Peruvian linguist and politician
- Mitch Hildebrandt (b. 1988), American football (soccer) goalkeeper
- Regine Hildebrandt (1941–2001), German biologist and politician
- Richard Hildebrandt (1897-1951), Nazi politician and SS-Obergruppenführer executed for war crimes
- Sarah Hildebrandt (born 1993), American freestyle wrestler
- Steen Hildebrandt (born 1944), Danish academic
- Theodor Hildebrandt (1804–1874), German artist
- Theophil Henry Hildebrandt (1888-1980), American mathematician
- Zacharias Hildebrandt (1688–1757), German master organ builder

== See also ==
- Hildebrand (disambiguation)
- Hildebrandt (airship), German airship named after Alfred Hildebrandt that crashed December 28, 1910 in Pomerania, Germany, killing two men
- Hildebrandt's moringa, tree species
