= Hildenbrand =

Hildenbrand is a surname. Notable people with the surname include:

- Dave Hildenbrand (born 1973), Assistant minority leader of the Michigan Senate
- Hans Hildenbrand (1870–1957), German photographer from World War I
- Klaus-Peter Hildenbrand (born 1952), West German athlete
- Oliver Hildenbrand (born 1988), German politician and state government minister in Baden-Württemberg
- Werner Hildenbrand (born 1936), German economist and mathematician
- Franz Xaver von Hildenbrand (1789–1849), Austrian physician and botanist

== See also ==
- Hildebrand (disambiguation)
