= Yosef Qafih =

Yemenite-Israeli rabbi, scholar and translator (1917–2000)

Rabbi Yosef Qafiḥ יוסף קאפח
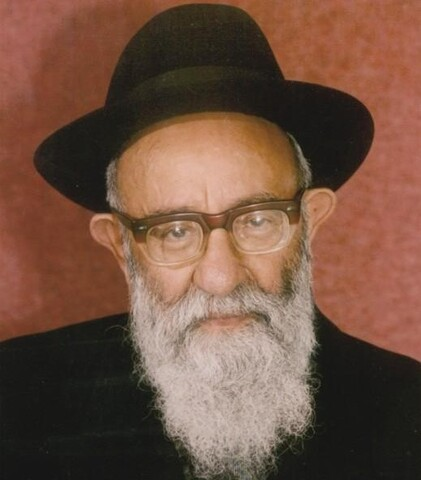

Personal life
- Born: 27 November 1917 Sana'a, Yemen, Ottoman Empire
- Died: 21 July 2000 (aged 82) Jerusalem, Israel
- Spouse: Bracha Qafih

Religious life
- Religion: Judaism

Yosef Qafiḥ (Hebrew: יוסף קאפח pronounced [josef qafiħ], Arabic: يوسف القافح), widely known as Rabbi Yosef Kapach (27 November 1917 – 21 July 2000), was an Israeli authority on Jewish religious law (halakha), a dayan of the Supreme Rabbinical Court in Israel, and one of the foremost leaders of the Yemenite Jewish community in Israel, where he was sought after by non-Yemenite jews as well. He is widely known for his editions and translations of the works of Maimonides, Saadia Gaon, and other early rabbinic authorities (Rishonim), particularly his restoration of the Mishneh Torah from old Yemenite manuscripts and his accompanying commentary culled from close to 300 additional commentators and with original insights. He was the grandson of Rabbi Yiḥyah Qafiḥ, a prominent Yemenite leader and founder of the Dor Deah movement in Yemen. Qafih received many awards, including an Honorary Doctorate from Bar-Ilan University.

== Biography ==
Yosef Qafiḥ was born 27 November 1917 in Sana'a in Yemen. His father was Rabbi David Qafiḥ, who died after being assaulted by an Arab man, when his son Yosef was less than one year old. At the age of five, Yosef also lost his mother and was raised by his grandfather Rabbi Yiḥyah Qafiḥ, under whom he studied Torah. In 1927, Yosef helped his grandfather retrieve the oldest complete Mishnah commentary from the Jewish community's genizah in Sana'a, containing Rabbi Nathan ben Abraham's elucidation of difficult words and passages in the Mishnah. The commentary was later published in Israel. (Young children in Yemen were often employed as copyists of ancient manuscripts.) At the age of thirteen, Yosef wrote out a complete copy of Maimonides' Guide for the Perplexed in Judeo-Arabic.

When Yosef was 14, his grandfather died. When he and two of his acquaintances went to visit the burial-site of Yosef's grandfather, and then his father, they were accused of having burnt the grave of his grandfather's chief disputant, and were arrested and held in bonds. Because of the rift in the community between those who adhered to kabbalah and the rationalists, the two informers told the Arab authority about the young Yosef being a Jewish orphan, and that under the laws of the state's Orphans' Decree he was required to be taken under the arms of the Islamic State and converted to Islam. The child was questioned about his father and upon the realization that his forced conversion to Islam was the informants' intent–with the arson accusation being a means to render him vulnerable to Muslim authority and attention–he did not answer his interrogator, and was released by the prison authority for no explained reason. The Imam, Yahya Muhammad Hamid ed-Din, urgently requested that they find him a bride to bypass forced conversion to Islam as an orphaned child. Rabbi Yihye al-Abyadh (the king's physician) arranged for Yosef's marriage to Bracha Saleh (Tzadok) in the same year of his grandfather's passing. She was approximately nine years old at the time. In his early years, he worked as a silversmith.

In 1943 he immigrated to Mandatory Palestine, where he studied at the Mercaz HaRav yeshiva and qualified as a dayan at the Harry Fischel Institute. In 1950 he was appointed as a dayan (rabbinic judge) in the Jerusalem district court. After Rabbi Ovadia Yosef was invited to serve on the Jerusalem beth din in 1958, in addition to Rabbi Qafih and Rabbi Waldenberg, rabbis Qafih and Yosef together would constitute a non-Ashkenazic majority in the beit din of three. In 1970, Qafih was appointed as a dayan in the Supreme Rabbinical Court. Throughout the course of more than half a century, numerous rabbis sat on various rabbinical courts with him, including Rabbis Tzvi Pesach Frank, Yosef Shalom Eliashiv, Ovadia Yosef, Avraham Shapira, Mordechai Eliyahu, and the Tzitz Eliezer.

Rabbi Yosef Qafiḥ was a member of the Chief Rabbinate Council of Israel and president of the Yemenite community in Jerusalem. He died on 21 July 2000 at the age of 82, and was buried in Jerusalem's Har HaMenuchot cemetery.

== Scholarship ==
His main work in the field of Torah literature was his translation and publication of manuscripts of numerous works by Sephardic Rishonim, including HaNivchar BeEmunot u'va-Deot of Saadia Gaon, the Torat Chovot HaLevavot by Bahya ibn Pakuda, the Kuzari by Judah ha-Levi and many other works in Judaeo-Arabic. The prime place in his oeuvre is reserved for the writings of Maimonides: he translated the Guide for the Perplexed, Commentary on the Mishnah, Sefer Hamitzvot, letters, and Beiur M'lekhet HaHiggayon, and he edited a 24-volume set of the Mishneh Torah (posthumously divided into 25). His works and translations received recognition from the academic and Rabbinic world alike. His edition of Maimonides' Commentary on the Mishnah in particular is a regularly cited source in ArtScroll's Yad Avraham Mishnah Series, with Rabbis Nosson Scherman and Meir Zlotowitz recognizing it as a "justly acclaimed translation of what is assumed to be Rambam's own manuscript." Rabbi Ovadia Yosef wrote that the seven years he sat with "the great Gaon Rabbi Yosef Qafiḥ ZT"L" in the beth din were "seven good years" and that Rabbi Qafiḥ toiled over his Torah day and night.

Qafih wrote extensively about the heritage of Yemenite Jews, describing in his sefer, "Halichot Teman", the Jewish life in Yemen, eclipsing even the renowned works of Amram Qorah and ethnographer, Yaakov Sapir. He published several works of Yemenite Jewish provenance, such as Maor ha-Afelah by Nethanel ben Isaiah (14th-century), and Garden of the Intellects by Natan'el al-Fayyumi (12th-century). He also published, under the title of the "Shivat Tzion" Tiklal, a Yemenite prayer book in three volumes with occasional notes citing views of Maimonides. In 1993 he published a new version under the title of "Siaḥ Yerushalayim" in four volumes (posthumously edited to six). Qafiḥ's seminal work, however, was his commentary on Maimonides' Mishne Torah, where he highlighted textual variations based on the Yemenite handwritten manuscripts of Maimonides' Code of Jewish law. Qafiḥ identified with the Dor Dai tendency, although he did not publicly express opposition to the Zohar, stating instead that it was preferable to draw from the teachings of Maimonides. In his leadership of the Yemenite community in Israel he endeavored to maintain peace between the main factions in the community and worked to preserve Yemenite customs. In matters pertaining to Yemenite customs, even where later customs conflict with the earlier custom, Rabbi Mordechai Eliyahu regarded the opinion of Rabbi Qafiḥ, who he called Mori Yusef (Hebrew: מארי יוסף), to be decisive.

The fruit of Rabbi Qafiḥ's scholarship remains, for the most part, untranslated and as such largely inaccessible to the English-speaking public. Examples of English translations based on his bilingual (Hebrew/Arabic) editions include Saadia on Job by Dr. Lenn E. Goodman, Professor of Philosophy and Jewish Studies, and Maimonides' Sefer Hamitzvot by Rabbi Berel Bell, Dayan of Kehilas Lubavitch on the Beth Din of Montreal and the founding dean of Chaya Mushka Seminary.

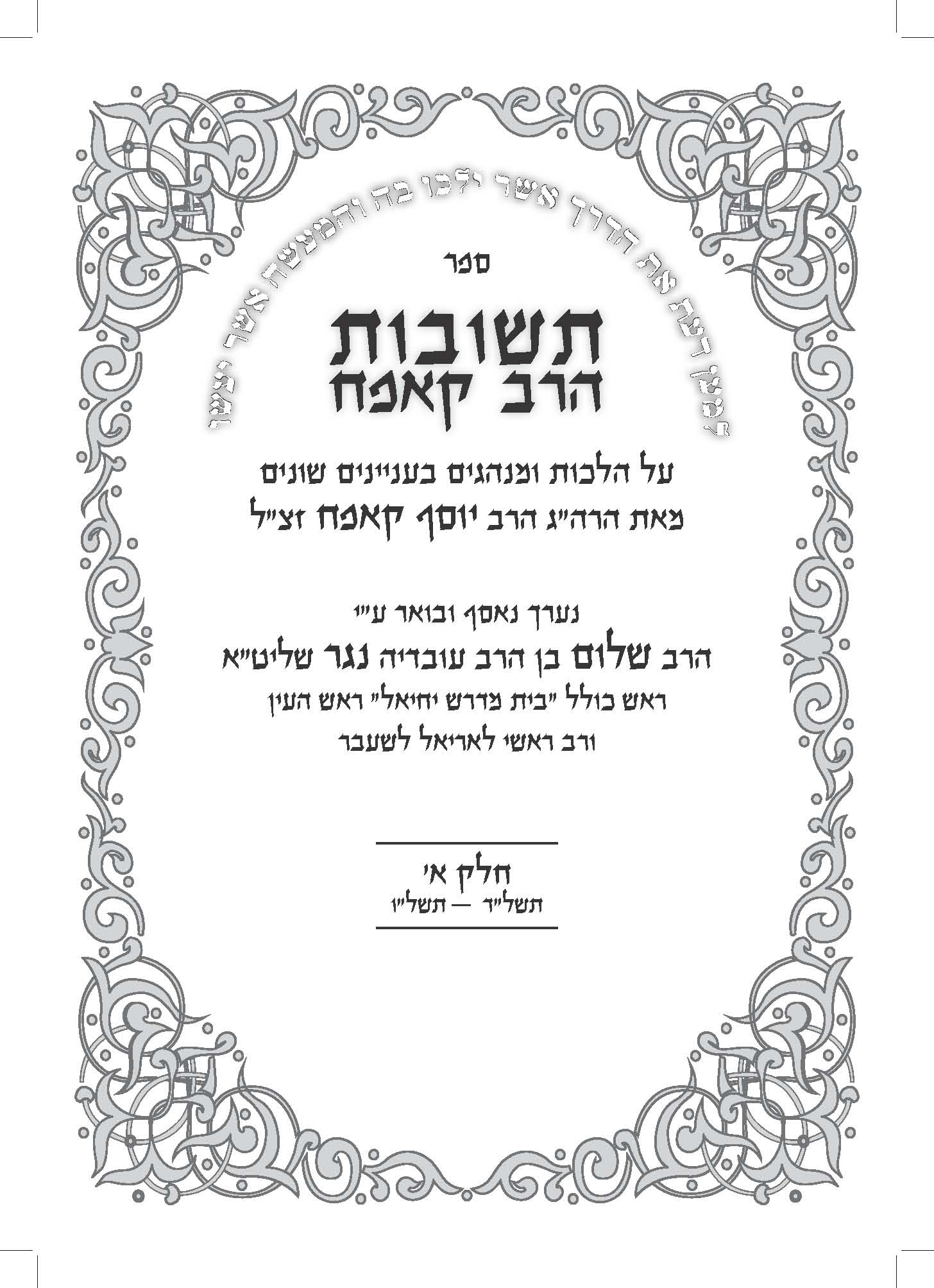
Halakhic responsa of Rabbi Yosef Qafih

== Legacy ==
Rabbi Qafih's followers observe halakhah as codified in Maimonides' Mishneh Torah with Qafih's commentary. Halakhic literature stemming from the rulings of Maimonides and Qafih has also been published. Although Rabbi Qafih had serious reservations about learning halakhah from halakhic compendiums and abridgments, for the benefit of the general public his students have published sefarim to aid in following the rulings of Maimonides and Qafih. Among these works, the following has been published:

- רצון יראיו על הלכות קרית שמע ותפילה להרמב"ם;
- ברכת משה על הלכות ברכות by Rabbi Aviad Ashwal, on the laws of b'rakhoth;
- חנוכת משה על הלכות חנוכה by Rabbi Aviad Ashwal, on the laws of Chanukkah;
- טהרת מש"ה by Rabbi Tzfanya Arusi, on the laws of family purity;
- שמטת משה על הלכות שביעית by Rabbi Aviad Ashwal, on the laws of Shmitta.

Of note is an index volume of sorts, Lanhotam (Hebrew title: לַנְחֹתָם דרך 'משנה תורה') by Yosi Seri, which is a reference guide for learners of the Mishneh Torah with Rabbi Qafih's commentary.

Written responsa of Rabbi Qafih have been printed (listed below in Published Works) and have been regularly publicized in Allon Or Hahalichot. Responsa drawn from Rabbi Qafih in oral conversations have been put to writing in תשובות הרב יוסף קאפח לתלמידו תמיר רצון (edited by Rabbi Itamar Cohen) and שו"ת טל יוסף: הרב יוסף קאפח of Rabbi Shmuel Tal.

Alongside the written works, shiurim rooted in Maimonidean doctrine and the exposition of Rabbi Qafih's teachings are given on a regular basis by a number of Rabbis in Israel such as Rabbis Ratzon Arusi, Uri Melammed, and Elyaqim Tzadoq. Shiurim of Rabbi Ratzon Arusi, Qafih's foremost student, are made freely available at net-sah.org.

Close to 10 volumes of the Masorah L'Yosef journal have been published which include essays by authors of various persuasions that deal with Maimonides' and Rabbi Yosef Qafih's teachings. Other publications of note, with essays relating to Qafih's teachings, include ספר זכרון לרב יוסף בן דוד קאפח, From Yemen to Israel (Hebrew: מתימן לישראל), and דברי שלום ואמת.

Of special note among Rabbi Yosef Qafih's expounders is Rabbi Aharon Qafih who in addition to giving many weekly shiurim has published the sefarim יריעות אהרן and מנחת אהרן, and numerous essays, devoted to Maimonidean doctrine and the teachings of Rabbi Yosef Qafih.

== Published works ==
- Saadia Gaon:
  - Sefer Yetzira, with Saadia Gaon's version of the text itself along with his Arabic commentary with facing Hebrew translation.
  - Translations into Hebrew of Saadya Gaon's Arabic translation and commentary on Tanakh have included volumes on the Torah, Megillot, Tehillim, Iyyov (translated to English by Dr. L. E. Goodman), Mishlei, and Daniel. (Although Saadia on Isaiah was not, on its own, translated by Kafih, he sometimes translated portions that he quoted, while at other times he referred readers to Derenbourg's edition.)
  - Megillath Antiyuchas (Hebrew: מגלת אַנְטִיוּכַס) with Saadya Gaon's Arabic translation and the extant portion of his introduction with facing Hebrew translation.
  - HaNivchar BeEmunot U'va-Deot (Hebrew: הנבחר באמונות ובדעות) in original Arabic with facing Hebrew translation.
- Torat Chovot HaLevavot in original Arabic with facing Hebrew translation.
- Commentary on the entire six orders of the Mishnah by an early Yemenite ḥakham, translated into Hebrew from the original Arabic.
- The Rif on Tractate Chullin with a commentary by an early Jewish Yemenite ḥakham in original Arabic with facing Hebrew translation.
- Kuzari in original Arabic with facing Hebrew translation.
- Gan HaSikhlim (Garden of the Intellects), written c. 1147, by Rabbeinu Nathanel Beirav Fayyumi, in original Arabic with facing Hebrew translation.
- Questions and Responsa of the Ra'avi (Abraham ben Isaac) Av Beth Din (Hebrew: שאלות ותשובות הראב"י אב"ד).
- Maimonides:
  - Beiur M'lekhet HaHiggayon, the first compilation of Maimonides, in original Arabic with facing Hebrew translation as well as various commentaries.
  - Maimonides' Commentary on the Mishnah, in original Arabic with facing Hebrew translation (later editions have Hebrew only, in three volumes).
    - A selection from Pereq Ḥeleq (Maimonides' commentary on the tenth chapter of Sanhedrin) was translated to English per Rabbi Kafih's edition by Charles E. Butterworth and Raymond L. Weiss in Ethical Writings of Maimonides (New York, 1975).
    - Eight Chapters (Maimonides' Introduction to Tractate Avoth) was translated to English, primarily per Rabbi Kafih's edition, by Charles E. Butterworth and Raymond L. Weiss in Ethical Writings of Maimonides (New York, 1975), p. 60-104.
  - Mishneh Torah (Hebrew: מִשׁנֵה תּוֹרָה) of the Rambam, published according to ancient Yemenite manuscripts, with his own commentary (23-25 volumes).
    Complete list of Mishneh Torah volumes
    - Sefer HaMadda` (Hebrew: סֵפֶר הַמַּדָּע): Volume 1: הקדמת הרמב"ם. מנין המצוות. תוכן ההלכות של כל ספר משנה תורה. ספר המדע: הִלכּוֹת יסודי התורה, הלכות דעות, הלכות תלמוד תורה, הלכות עבודה זרה וחקות הגוים, הלכות תשובה
    - Sefer Ahavah (Hebrew: ספר אַהֲבָה): Volume 2: ספר אהבה: הלכות קרית שמע, הלכות תפלה וברכת כהנים, הלכות תפלין ומזוזה וספר תורה, הלכות ציצית, הלכות ברכות, הלכות מילה. נוסח התפלה
    - Sefer Zemannim (Hebrew: ספר זְמַנִּים)
      - Volume 3: הלכות שבת, הלכות ערובין, הלכות שביתת עשור
      - Volume 4a: הלכות שביתת יום טוב, הלכות חמץ ומצה, נוסח ההגדה
      - Volume 4b: הלכות שופר וסוכה ולולב, הלכות שקלים, הלכות קדוש החדש, הלכות תעניות, הלכות מגלה וחנוכה
    - Sefer Nashim (Hebrew: ספר נָשִׁים)
      - Volume 5: הלכות אישות
      - Volume 6: הלכות גרושין, הלכות יבום וחליצה, הלכות נערה בתולה, הלכות שוטה
    - Sefer Kedusshah (Hebrew: ספר קְדוּשָּׁה)
      - Volume 7: הלכות אסורי ביאה
      - Volume 8a: הלכות מאכלות אסורות
      - Volume 8b: הלכות שחיטה
    - Sefer Hafla'ah (Hebrew: ספר הַפלָאָה): Volume 9: הלכות שבועות, הלכות נדרים, הלכות נזירות, הלכות ערכים וחרמים
    - Sefer Zera'im (Hebrew: ספר זְרָעִים)
      - Volume 10: הלכות כלאים, הלכות מתנות ענים, הלכות תרומות
      - Volume 11: הלכות מעשרות, הלכות מעשר שני ונטע רבעי, הלכות בכורים עם שאר מתנות כהונה שבגבולין, הלכות שמטה ויובל
    - Sefer Avodah (Hebrew: ספר עֲבוֹדָה)
      - Volume 12: הלכות בית הבחירה, הלכות כלי המקדש והעובדים בו, הלכות ביאת המקדש, הלכות אסורי מזבח, הלכות מעשה הקרבנות
      - Volume 13: הלכות תמידין ומוספין, הלכות פסולי המוקדשין, הלכות עבודת יום הכפורים, הלכות מעילה
    - Sefer HaKarbanot (Hebrew: ספר הַקָּרבָּנוֹת): Volume 14: הלכות קרבן פסח, הלכות חגיגה, הלכות בכורות, הלכות שגגות, הלכות מחוסרי כפרה, הלכות תמורה
    - Sefer Taharah (Hebrew: ספר טָהֳרָה)
      - Volume 15: הלכות טומאת מת, הלכות פרה אדומה, הלכות טומאת צרעת, הלכות מטמאי משכב ומושב
      - Volume 16: הלכות שאר אבות הטומאות, הלכות טומאת אוכלין, הלכות כלים, הלכות מקוות
    - Sefer Nezikin (Hebrew: ספר נְזִיקִין): Volume 17: הלכות נזיקי ממון, הלכות גנבה, הלכות גזלה ואבדה, הלכות חובל ומזיק, הלכות רוצח ושמירת נפש
    - Sefer Kinyan (Hebrew: ספר קִניָן)
      - Volume 18: הלכות מכירה, הלכות זכייה ומתנה
      - Volume 19: הלכות שכנים, הלכות שלוחין ושותפין, הלכות עבדים
    - Sefer Mishpatim (Hebrew: ספר מִשׁפָּטִים)
      - Volume 20: הלכות שכירות, הלכות שאלה ופקדון, הלכות מלוה ולוה
      - Volume 21: הלכות טוען ונטען, הלכות נחלות
        - Appended to this is Rabbi Kapach's listing and explanation of "מפי השמועה" and "מפי הקבלה" in Mishneh Torah (34 pages).
    - Sefer Shofetim (Hebrew: ספר שׁוֹפְטִים)
      - Volume 22: הלכות סנהדרין והעונשין המסורין להן, הלכות עדות
      - Volume 23: הלכות ממרים, הלכות אבל, הלכות מלכים ומלחמות
  - Sefer Hamitzvot, in original Arabic with facing Hebrew translation (5731 [1971]). This edition succeeded the Rambam L'Am edition of Sefer HaMitzvot (5718 [1958]) for which Rabbi Qafih provided his translation and notes. In his later edition Rabbi Qafih repeatedly called out the former edition for its printing of errors against his agreement and without his knowledge, emphasizing that it should not be relied upon.
    - Based on what was then the newly-published edition of Rambam L'Am, Rabbi Dr. Charles B. Chavel translated Sefer HaMitzvot, published in two volumes by the Soncino Press in 1967 as The Commandments (Sefer Ha-Mitzvoth of Maimonides). Soncino Press described their edition as "the first complete English translation of the Sefer Ha-Mitzvoth based upon Rabbi Kapach's work." As Rabbi Bell would later note, "neither Rabbi Chavel nor Soncino were aware of Rabbi Kapach's reservations about the 1958 edition," as only 13 years thereafter, in 1971, would Rabbi Qafih supersede this Mossad Harav Kook edition.
    - Based on Rabbi Qafih's edition with the original Arabic, Rabbi Berel Bell produced an English translation (from Qafih's Hebrew) of the mitzvot in two volumes. His English translation, however, lacks Maimonides' Introduction and Principles.
  - Guide for the Perplexed in original Arabic with facing Hebrew translation (later editions have Hebrew only, in one volume).
  - Iggeroth haRambam, in original Arabic with facing Hebrew translation.
  - T'shuvot haRambam (with either Rabbi Qafih's translations or summarizations), printed in Qafih's notes throughout the Mishneh Torah. These translations were posthumously collected and appended to the end of the reprint (Rubin Mass and Makhon Moshe, Jerusalem, 2014) of Blau's four-volume edition of Maimonides' Responsa.
- Ba'alei ha-Nefesh by Ra'avad with Sela' ha-Maḥloḳot of the רז"ה.
- Responsa and Rulings of Ra'avad (Hebrew: תשובות ופסקים לראב"ד).
- Questions and Responsa of the Ritva (Hebrew: שו"ת הריטב"א), Jerusalem, Mossad Harav Kook, 1978, edited with an introduction and notes.
- Maor Haafelah by Nethanel ben Isaiah, in original Arabic with accompanying Hebrew translation.
- Commentary on the Early Prophets by Avraham ben Shlomo, in original Arabic with facing Hebrew translation (in multiple volumes).
- Midrash Habeiur, in original Arabic with facing Hebrew translation.
- שאלות ר' חטר בן שלמה, in original Arabic with facing Hebrew translation.
- ספר המעלות לדרגות ימות המשיח, in original Arabic with facing Hebrew translation.
- Kitāb al-Ḥaqāyiq - Sefer ha-Amitiyyuth (כתאב אלחקאיק - ספר האמתיות), in original Arabic with facing Hebrew translation.
- Collected Papers (three volumes)
  Volumes and now-online papers included therein
  - Volume 1 (1989): Halacha [and Divrei Torah], Philosophy, Sages' Writings. Among its contents the following are freely available online (from their original sources of publication):
    - בירור בדין „הגונב את הקסוה" (originally published in 1983).
    - על חודש תמוז (originally published in 1964).
    - Responsa of Rabbeinu Jacob of Ramerupt (Rabbeinu Tam) (originally published in 1968).
    - Forty Philosophical Responsa of R. Peraḥia ben R. Meshullam.
  - Volume 2 (1989): Maimonidean Doctrine, Yemenite Jewry. Among its contents the following are freely available online (most from their original sources of publication):
    - "ופליגא" במשנת הרמב"ם (originally published in 1983).
    - Hayyim Habshush's "History of the Jews in Yemen" (originally published in 1958; with English abstract).
    - The Book Dofi Ha-zeman ("The Vicissitudes of Time"), of R. Sa'id Sa'adi: Events befalling the Jews of Yemen during the Years 1717—1726 (originally published in 1956; with English abstract).
    - Tribulations of Yemen (originally published in 1961; with English abstract).
    - משפטים בתימן (newly typeset online edition).
    - בתי כנסת בתימן (newly typeset online edition, with photos absent from Collected Papers).
    - כותבי ומעתיקי ספרים בתימן (newly typeset online edition, with photos absent from Collected Papers).
    - מעמד האשה בתימן (newly typeset online edition).
    - 'לאז' או 'כחאל' (originally published in 1982).
  - Volume 3 (posthumously published in 2001): Sources, Miscellanies. Among its contents the following is freely available online (from its original source of publication):
    - הערות אחדות על שני תרגומים מערבית לעברית (originally published in 1994).
  - Material not collected therein (but listed in the bibliography)
    - Shavuoth in Yemen, the first paper published by Rabbi Qafih (1947).
    - Portions of three unknown early Judeo-Arabic commentaries to the Bible and a Judeo-Arabic commentary to Sefer Yetzira.
- המקרא ברמב"ם (index to the verses of the Bible in the Rambam).
- Halikhoth Teiman: Jewish Life in Sanà (first edition published in 1961; second edition in 1963; third edition in 1987 ISBN 965-17-0137-4). Posthumously, a repaginated and newly typeset edition has been published.
- Shivath Tsiyyon (1950s), a new edition of the Baladi Yemenite prayer book.
- Yemenite Passover Aggadta with four Yemenite commentaries, the Arabic among them translated into Hebrew.
- Siaḥ Yerushalayim (1993), the newest edition of the Baladi Yemenite prayer book.
- First published posthumously:
  - Rabbi Yosef Kafiḥ's Notebook on the Plants of the Mishna (published by Dr. Zohar Amar).
  - קונדריס שיחת דקלים (published by Rabbi Dr. Uri Melammed).
  - In volume 8 of Masorah L'Yosef: לתקופת הימים; a paper that Rabbi Yosef Kapach wrote about Rabbi Moshe Tsarum; and speeches for Bar Mitzvahs.
- Responsa of Rabbi Yosef Qafih (posthumously published):
  - עדות ביהוסף (collected beth din rulings).
  - שו"ת הריב"ד (with commentary by Rabbi Avraham Ḥamami) in multiple volumes.
  - Responsa related to laws of family purity: appended to Taharath Moshe (2015) by Rabbi Tzfanya Arusi.
  - ספר תשובות הרב קאפח (with extensive commentary by Rabbi Shalom Nagar) in many volumes.

== Recorded Shiurim ==
The following has been published in book form, as part of the Lectures of Rabbi Yosef Qafih series:

- Volume 1: Maimonides' Introduction to the Mishnah Commentary
- Volume 2: Maimonides' Introduction to Perek Helek

Recorded shiurim (digitized from cassettes), which were held in the Rabbi's native Yemenite Hebrew, have been put out by Machon Mishnat HaRambam as CDs in the early 2010s and, in 2020-2021, as MP3s uploaded to their net-sah.org website. The series was published under the Hebrew title שיעורים מפי הרה"ג יוסף קאפח:

- רס"ג
  - הנבחר באמונות ובדעות (four CDs)
- רבנו בחיי
  - תורת חובות הלבבות (five CDs)
- רבנו נתנאל בירב פיומי
  - גן השכלים (two CDs)
- רמב"ם
  - הקדמה לפירוש המשנה (one CD)
  - פירוש המשנה
    - פירוש לפרק עשירי – מסכת סנהדרין - פרק "חלק" (one CD)
    - הקדמה למסכת אבות המכונה "שמונה פרקים" (one CD)
  - מורה הנבוכים (eleven CDs)
  - אגרות (one CD)

== Awards and recognition ==
- In both 1962 and 1973, Qafiḥ was awarded the Bialik Prize for Jewish thought.
- In 1969, he was awarded the Israel Prize for Jewish studies. His wife, Rabbanit Bracha Qafih, was also awarded the Israel Prize for her special contributions to society and the State in 1999, in recognition of her extensive charitable work (this was the only occasion on which a married couple have both been awarded the Israel Prize).
- Qafiḥ has also won the Rabbi Kook Prize, and was awarded an honorary doctorate by Bar Ilan University.

== See also ==
- List of Israel Prize recipients
- List of Bialik Prize recipients
