= Jules Gervais-Courtellemont =

French photographer

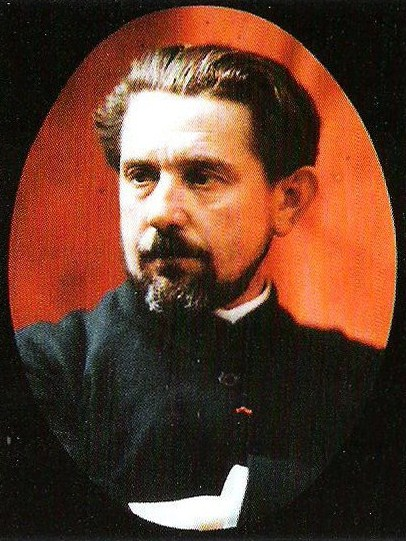
Jules Gervais-Courtelmont in 1914.

Jules Gervais-Courtellemont (1863–1931) was a French photographer who was famous for taking color autochromes during World War I.

== Life ==
He was born near Fontainebleau in Avon, Seine-et-Marne, south of Paris. He emigrated with his parents in 1874 to Algeria, where they started a family agricultural business that quickly failed. He remained in Algeria for 20 years, developing a passion for the pre-colonial Orient. He spent most of his professional career in search of the exotic. In 1894 he converted to Islam, prior to making a pilgrimage to Mecca. His book Mon Voyage a la Mecque was published by Hachette in 1896.

After experiments with monochrome photography, he adopted the Autochrome Lumière system, which went on sale in June 1907. In 1911, Courtellemont opened the "Palais de l'autochromie" at 167 rue Montmartre in Paris. It comprised an exhibition hall, studio, laboratory, and lecture hall with seating capacity of 250. It was in this hall that Courtellemont would project his autochromes of the Orient. Images collected in Turkey, Palestine, Egypt, Tunisia, Spain, India, Morocco and China formed the basis for his popular illustrated lectures, which he illustrated with lantern slides.

With the outbreak of World War I, Courtellemont returned to his home province to record the war. He continued to show his war photographs at the "Palais", particularly the Marne battlefields. His lectures proved so popular that Courtellemont issued a 12-part series of the First Battle of the Marne, later bound in book form as Les champs de bataille de la Marne, and a four-part series entitled Les champs de bataille de Verdun about the Battle of Verdun. These were the first books ever published in color on war. Between 1923 and 1925 he wrote a three-volume work entitled La Civilisation – Histoire sociale de l'humanité, illustrated with his photographs.

After the war, Courtellemont worked for an American publication. He eventually became a photographer for National Geographic.

He was a lifelong friend of the novelist, Orientalist and photographer Pierre Loti. While over 5,500 Gervais-Courtellemont autochromes survive in various institutional collections, including the Musée Albert-Kahn in Boulogne-Billancourt and the Cinémathèque Robert-Lynen in central Paris, his work in private hands is quite rare and sought after. His German contemporary, who made autochromes of German troops during World War 1, was Hans Hildenbrand.

Courtellemont died in 1931.

== Style ==
Courtellemont's work displays a tight sense of composition, an acute awareness of the interplay of light on color, and a haunting familiarity of symbolism. Landscapes are carefully composed, with attention to lighting and placement within the picture frame. He used symbols, such as a lonely cross and a charred tree, for dramatic effect.

== Gallery ==
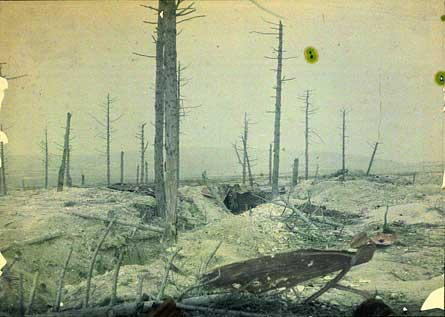
Devastated landscape at the French lines.

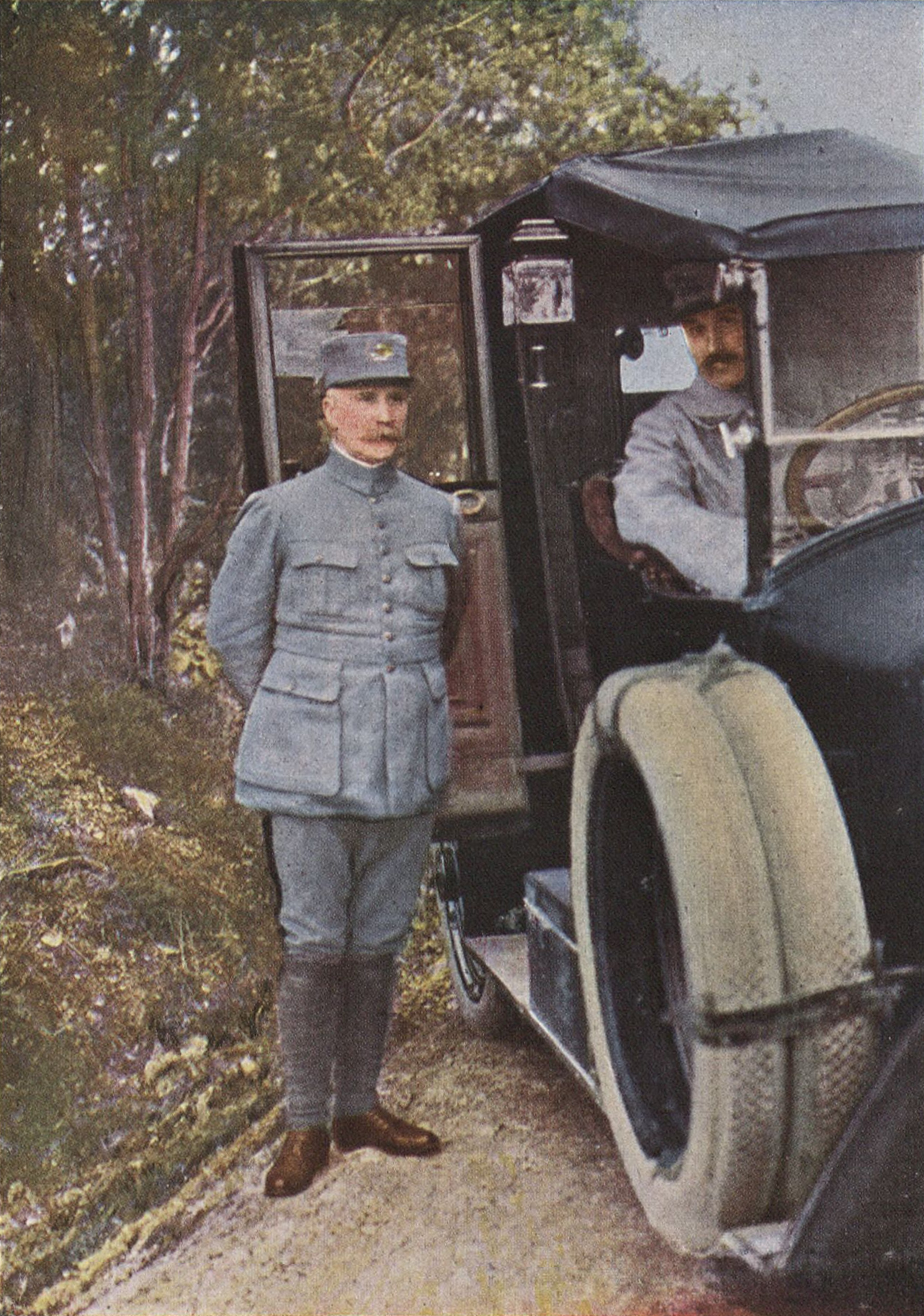
General Philippe Pétain.

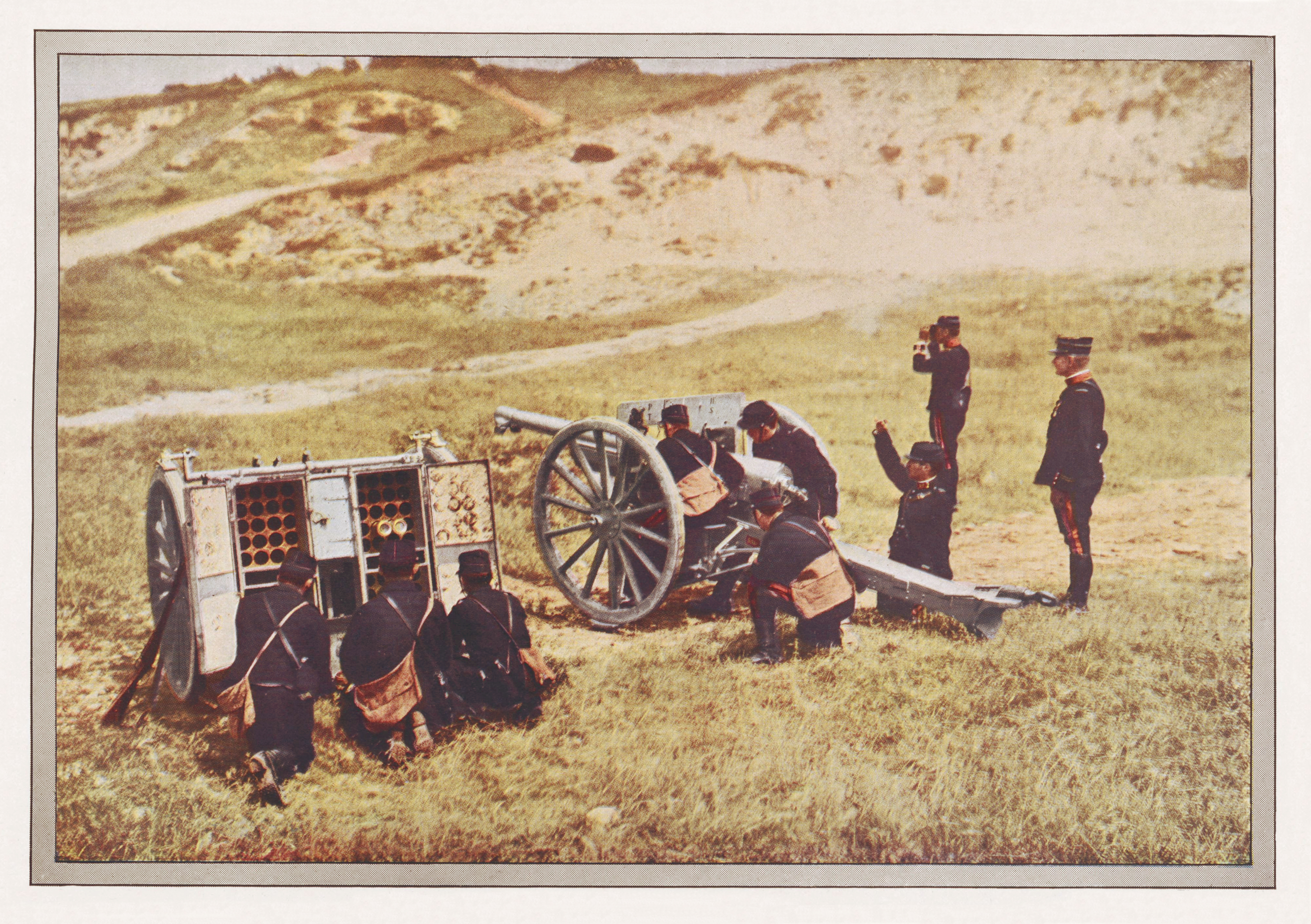
French artillery men and 75-millimetre gun.

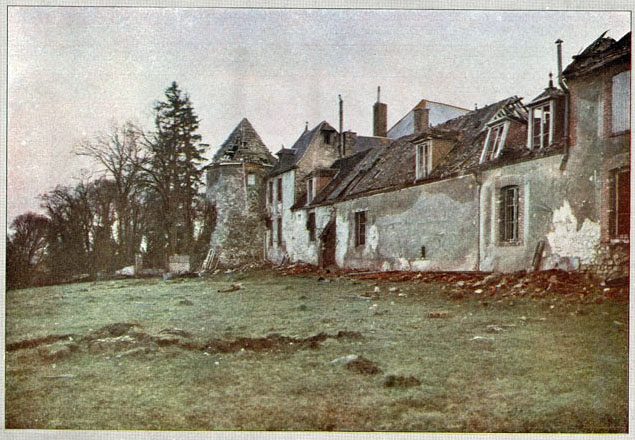
Castle of Mondement in Marais de Saint-Gond 9/9/1914.

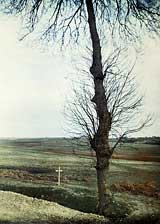
The lonely cross and charred tree were used by Courtellemont for dramatic effect.
