= Hildebrand Veckinchusen =

Merchant living in Bruges at the time of the Hanseatic League

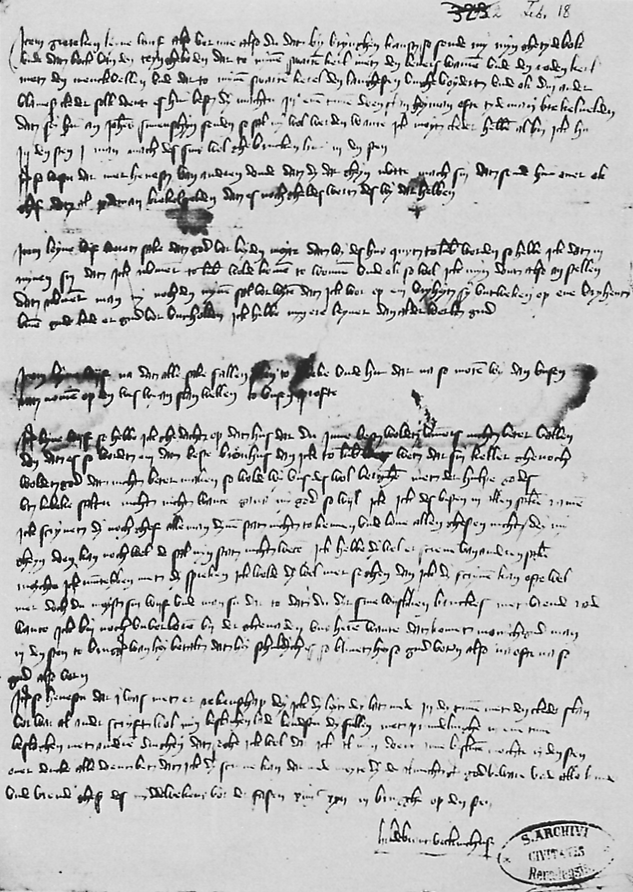
Letter from Hildebrand Veckinchusen dated February 18, 1422, which he sent from the Bruges debtors' prison to his second wife Margarethe (last page)

Hildebrand Veckinchusen (born around 1370, probably in Westphalia; died July 1426 in Lübeck) was a merchant living in Bruges (then under the Burgundian State) at the time of the Hanseatic League. In addition to the fact that Hildebrand and his brother Sivert were among the most respected Hanseatic merchants of their time, Veckinchusen is of outstanding importance for research into the business practices and lives of merchants in the late Middle Ages due to the survival of more than 500 letters and ten trade books.

== Life ==
=== Origin and education ===
Hildebrand Veckinchusen's year of birth is not known, but is generally estimated to be around 1370. His mother's first name was "Rixe", his father's is unknown. There is no conclusive information about Hildebrand's origins. Luise von Winterfeld assumes that Hildebrand was also born in Dortmund based on a statement by Hildebrand that he had seen the emperor in Dortmund at the beginning of 1377 when he was a child. Dollinger considers a Livonian city more likely due to the fact that Hildebrand's third brother was a councillor in Riga and mayor between 1402 and 1408 and a Bertold Veckinchusen is documented as a councillor and later mayor in Reval (now Tallinn) between 1342 and 1353. Irsigler, on the other hand, cites an inheritance contract from 1395, recorded before the council of the town of Radevormwald in Westphalia, in which a Gottschalck Veckinchusen compared himself to his brothers Hans, Hildebrand, Sievert, the clergyman Mr. Ludwig and three sisters. The fact that the family name "Veckinchusen" is derived from the village of Fockinghausen near Radevormwald or from a village of the same name near Meschede also suggests that Veckinchusen came from Westphalia. In any case, the unusually high mobility of the family should be noted, as merchants of this name appeared throughout the Hanseatic region in the 14th century.

In his youth, Veckinchusen trained as a merchant's assistant in Livonia together with his older brother Sivert before following the latter to Flanders, where he presumably continued his training. His first commercial activities are recorded for the year 1390 in Dordrecht, where Hildebrand had himself certified at the stack that he had duly purchased two terlings of cloth and twelve bots of wine.

=== Business and social situation around 1400 ===
Hildebrand is mentioned for the years 1393 and 1398 and Sivert for the year 1399 as an alderman of the Hanseatic trading post in Bruges, which indicates a rapid rise in business for the two brothers. This is supported by the fact that Hildebrand's first marriage was to the sister of Dortmund councillor and mayor Claus Swarte. According to Rolf Hammel, this and Sivert's ownership of three houses in Bruges, which later became the residence of the Hanseatic kontor, lead to the conclusion that the two brothers were "among the most respected Hanseatic merchants in Flanders" in those years.

Shortly after the death of his first wife, Hildebrand remarried with the help of his brother Caesar, who lived in Riga. In 1398, Caesar put him in touch with Margarethe Witte (around 1382 - after 1433), who came from a wealthy Riga merchant family and is described in a letter from Caesar to Hildebrand dated July 1, 1398 as a "handsome maiden of 15 years" (sůverlike juncvrouwe van 15 jaren). After a short stay in the house of his father-in-law Engelbrecht Witte, Hildebrand traveled to Novgorod, then fell out with Engelbrecht over a dowry of 100 marks and finally settled in Lübeck, following the example of his brother Sivert. There he obtained citizenship and married Taleke, his daughter from his first marriage, to Peter van dem Damme from a Lübeck council family around 1400, thereby expanding his circle of relations in Lübeck. However, Hildebrand returned to Bruges as early as 1402, where he remained until 1426, apart from a few short trips. However, he retained his Lübeck citizenship for the rest of his life; his wife Margarethe and his children also lived in Lübeck.

=== Expansion and organizational structure of trading activities ===
Thanks to the analysis of business letters discovered by the economic historian Wilhelm Stieda in the last third of the 19th century, it is known that Veckinchusen was involved in a widely ramified network of trade relations from Flanders, mainly based on family ties, which spanned the entire Hanseatic region from Novgorod to London and extended south to Venice and west to Bayonne on the French Atlantic coast.

Organizationally, the Veckinchusens' business was often based on trading companies that were entered into with a small number of partners for a fixed period of time. This form of organization offered the advantage that larger capital could be invested and the risk for the individual could be reduced. The capital investment was usually divided equally between the individual partners and profits and losses were later also shared equally.

Unlike in the mid-13th century, when Hanse merchants usually accompanied their goods themselves and sold them in barter, Hildebrand Veckinchusen managed his business from his Bruges office and only traveled on important occasions, such as the regular trade fairs. The goods bearing his house mark were usually entrusted to the carrier - in the case of sea trade transactions, the captain of the merchant ship concerned - or accompanied by a journeyman and sold at their destination by Veckinchusen's correspondent.

=== Trade between Flanders and Livonia ===
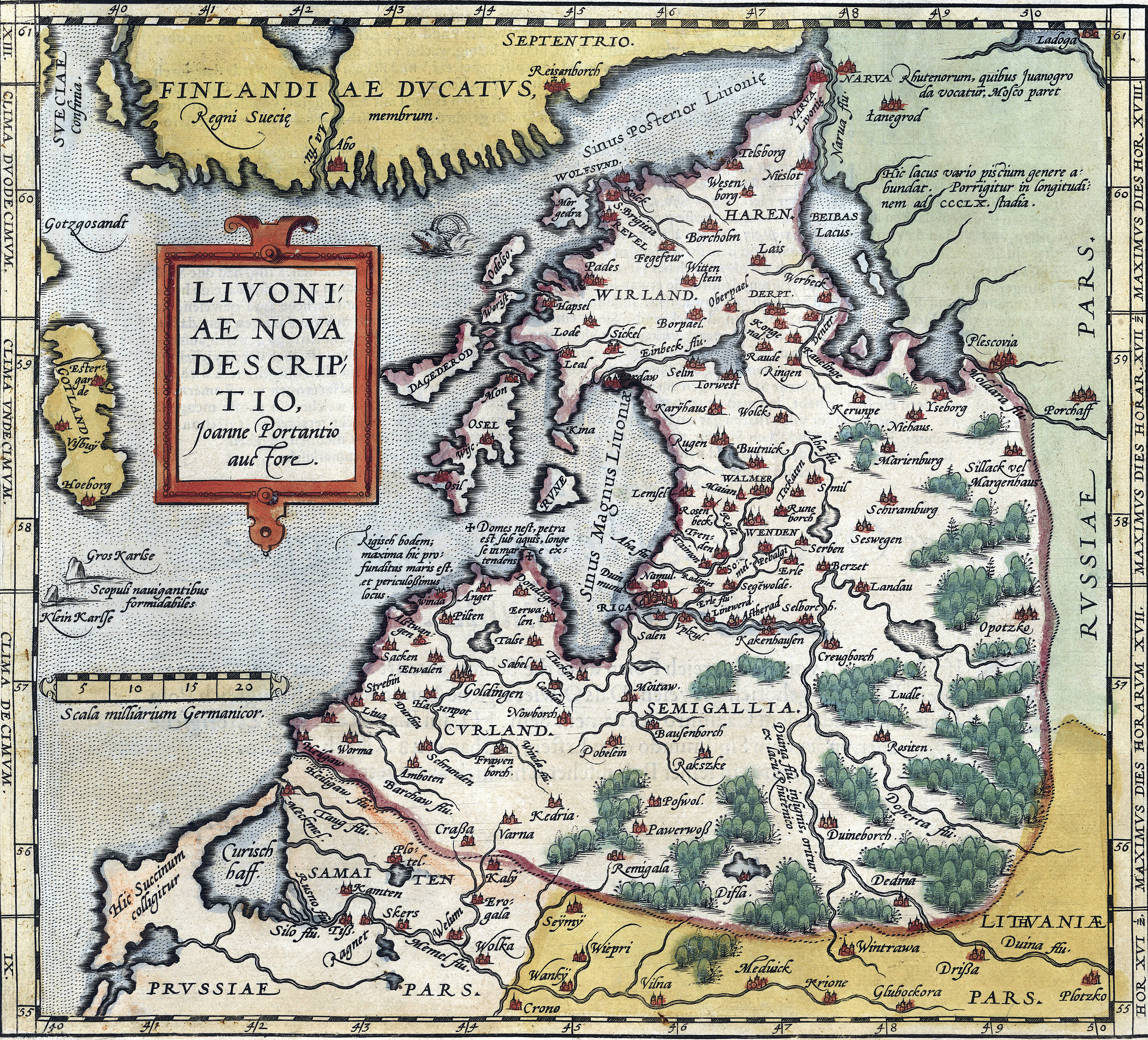
Historical map of Livonia

At the beginning of the 15th century, Veckinchusen traded mainly with Livonia, where he shipped cloth, salt and spices and bought wax and furs in return. Hildebrand and his brother Sivert were organized into several trading companies for this trade between Flanders and Livonia. On August 3, 1405, they entered into a company together with the brothers Hartwig and Gottschalk Steenhus, whose individual transactions are described in detail in a comprehensive account by the Riga councillor Hartwig Steenhus from December 1407. According to Walter Stark's calculations, the Veckinchusen/Steenhus company made a profit of 12% in the two years of its existence, although this would not have been achieved if a single very successful transaction involving wax from Livonia to Lübeck had not made up for the losses of the other sub-operations. In 1406, Hildebrand and his brother Sivert founded another trading company together with partners in Reval and Dorpat, which, however, did not make a profit in the six years of its existence, as the profits from the sale of cloth did not offset the losses from the fur and wax trade. Irsigler attributes this to the fact that the price level for these goods on the Flemish and Livonian markets had converged too far at that time.

=== The "Venice selscop" ===
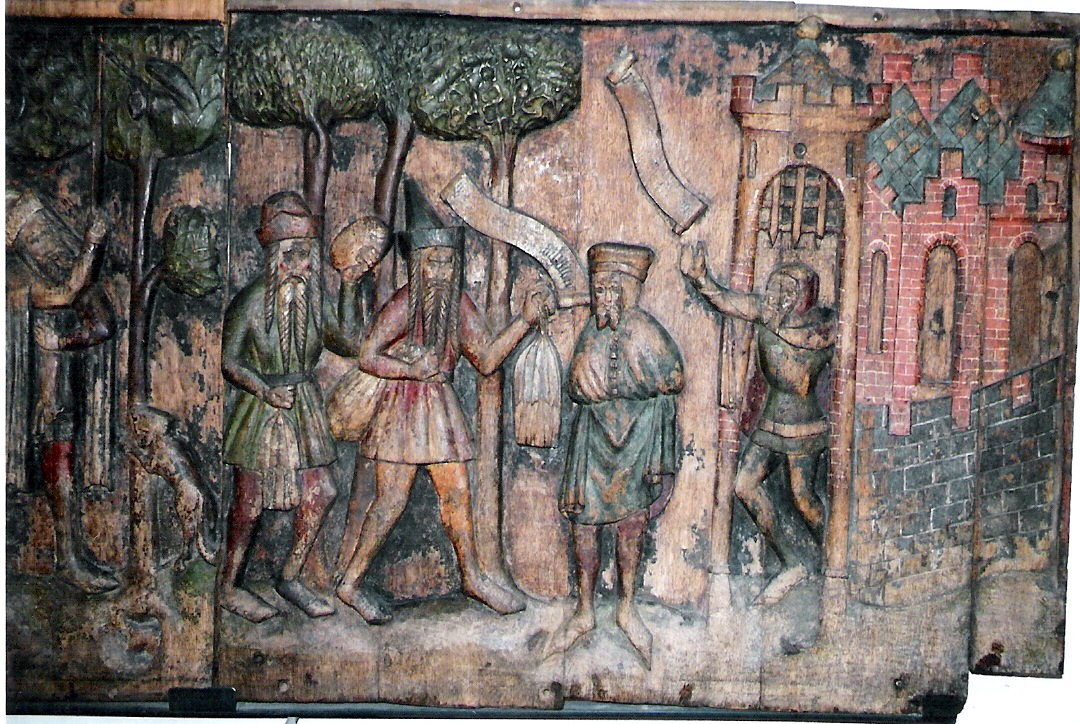
Furs were one of the Veckinchusen brothers' most important trade goods. Between 1403 and 1415, they imported considerable quantities from the East: around 90,000 pieces from Reval alone, 67,000 from Riga and 153,000 from Gdansk. The experiences of the Hanseatic merchants in the Baltic and Russia also left their mark on Hanseatic art. Here is one of four carved panels from the Riga sailors' stalls, which the Stralsund Riga sailors donated to St. Nicholas Church in their home town in the 14th century: bearded Russians hand over their hunting spoils, squirrel and ermine skins, to a German merchant.

In the first decade of the 15th century, twelve merchants, including Sivert and Hildebrand Veckinchusen, founded the so-called "venedyesche selscop" (Venetian Company) in order to establish direct contacts with northern Italy and eliminate the Venetian middlemen based in Bruges. The members of the Venetian Company transported their goods almost exclusively by land and sold the goods they bought in Venice, such as spices, sugar, brazilwood, alum and incense, on the markets of Flanders, England, the Holy Roman Empire and Scandinavia. In return, amber prayer wreaths, cloth and furs were brought to Venice. By 1409, the business of the Venetian Company was apparently doing so well that the partners Peter Karbow, Heinrich Slyper and Sivert Veckinchusen wrote a letter from Cologne to their Bruges co-partners Heinrich op dem Orde and Hildebrand Veckinchusen proposing an increase in the company's capital from 5,000 to 11,000 marks in Lübisch. Presumably due to the ruinous business practices of the merchant Peter Karbow, who was sent to Venice on behalf of the trading company, and his nephew of the same name, the Venetian Company fell into a crisis around 1411. Karbow purchased overpriced goods and ruined the prices on the Venetian market with an oversupply of furs, so that in April 1411 the goods purchased in Venice worth around 70,000 ducats were ultimately offset by Hanseatic trade goods worth around 53,000 ducats. Moreover, the company's large turnover could only be financed by bills of exchange drawn on partners based in Bruges, Cologne and Lübeck, which often matured before the date of sale of the goods. Added to this was the apparent dishonesty of Peter Karbow, who was finally arrested in Lüneburg in 1412. After his capture, Karbow gave up all the goods stored in Venice to society in order to buy his freedom. The ban on trade with Venice issued by King Sigismund in 1417 marked the end of the company.

=== Lack of money and risky business ===
The first signs of Hildebrand Veckinchusen's business decline can be found in the reminders from his business partners from 1414 onwards, which indicate that Veckinchusen was at times in dire financial straits. Hammel attributes these problems to the losses in trade with the East caused by sales problems. Added to this was the fact that Veckinchusen did not get back his share of a loan made to the Roman-German King Sigismund in 1417 on his accession to power when he was pressed by his creditors.

However, Hildebrand did not give up the risky trade with Venice. In 1417/18, he suffered considerable losses when he sent a large quantity of cloth to Venice, apparently misjudging the market situation. In May 1418, two bills of exchange drawn on London burst, foreshadowing the later catastrophe. In the late summer of 1418, Hildebrand moved to Lübeck with his family and bought a prestigious house in Königstrasse. Shortly afterwards, he returned to Bruges without his wife and children and was elected Alderman of the Bruges Kontor in 1419, which indicates that he still enjoyed credit and prestige in Bruges, at least at this time.

=== Debtor's prison and death ===
The high interest rates that Veckinchusen had to pay to the Bruges-based moneylenders for the loans he had taken out up to that point made him increasingly dependent on them. Added to this was the failure of a speculation in French salt, which caused his Livonian business partners to become disgruntled. As the situation continued to deteriorate, Hildebrand used the Antwerp Whitsun Fair in the spring of 1421 to flee from his creditors. After stays in Lübeck and Cologne, however, he returned to Bruges in the fall of 1421 to attempt to repay his loans.

But in February 1422, at the insistence of one of his creditors, a Genoese banker, he was imprisoned in the Bruges debtor's tower for a debt of 120 pounds Flemish. In the years that followed, most of his friends turned their backs on him. His wife Margarethe, who remained in Lübeck with the children, became increasingly financially strapped and was sued out of the house by his brother Sivert's mother-in-law and lost it. Sivert only supported Margarethe and the children to the extent that they did not have to go begging, as this would have damaged his own reputation in Lübeck.

From the fall of 1424, the last remaining friends of Hildebrand intensified their efforts and finally managed to secure Hildebrand's release by spending considerable financial resources and obtaining a guarantee from his son-in-law Peter van dem Damme. After his release from the debtors' prison on April 14 or 15, 1426, Hildebrand made one last attempt to pay off his creditors by resuming trading activities, but then embarked for Lübeck on May 1, 1426, at Margaret's insistence, where he died a few weeks later.

== The source situation and editorial history ==
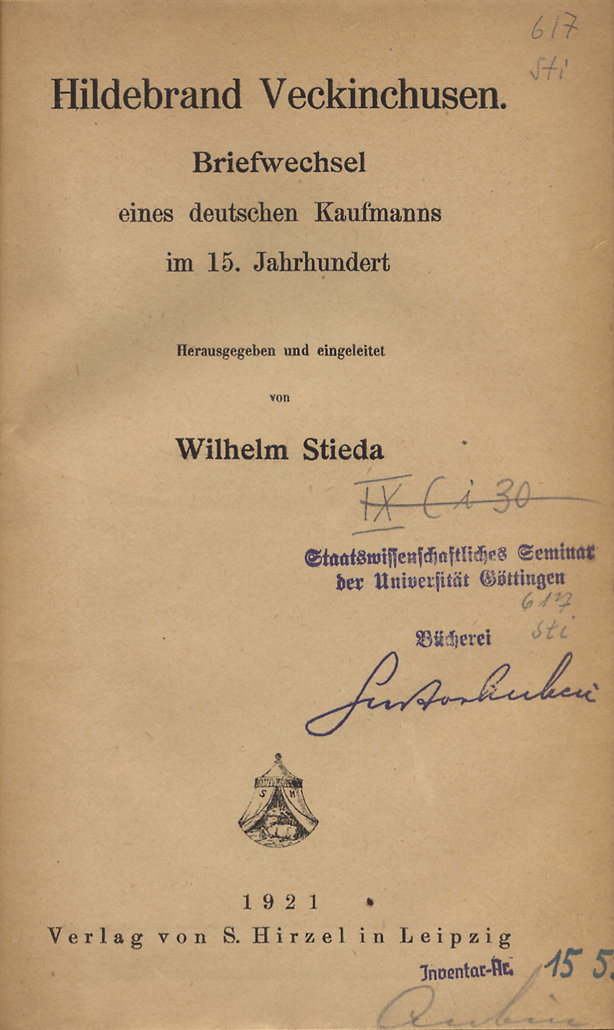
Title page of the edition of letters published by Wilhelm Stieda in 1921

The surviving written evidence of the business activities of Hanseatic merchants is extremely poor. Of all the Hanseatic merchants of the Middle Ages, Hildebrand Veckinchusen and his brother Sivert left behind by far the most extensive source material.

Wilhelm Stieda began the first comprehensive processing of this material in the summer of 1879, around a year and a half after taking up his professorship at the University of Dorpat (now Tartu). According to his own statement, he used the semester break for a trip to Reval, after he had become aware of the letters in the city archives there through a collection of registers by Eduard Papst and Gotthard Hansen. During this stay, he found further source material himself: "A lucky coincidence led me to discover a wooden box in the archive one day, which contained a large number of letters, also from and to Hildebrand Veckinchusen, under a thick layer of pepper, many more than had previously been recorded in the aforementioned place." In 1887 and 1895, Stieda published the first 35 letters as part of two treatises dealing with a monetary transaction between Hildebrand Veckinchusen and the future Emperor Sigismund and with the Veckinchusens' trade relations with Venice. The publication of a two-volume complete edition planned by Stieda, the first volume of which was to contain the letters and the second the trading books also found in Reval, was repeatedly delayed due to a lack of money, the outbreak of the First World War and unfavorable circumstances. It was not until 1921 that Stieda succeeded in publishing the letters in the volume Hildebrand Veckinchusen. Briefwechsel eines deutschen Kaufmanns im 15. Jahrhundert. With Stieda's death in 1933, the plan to print the remaining material remained unfinished. It should also be noted that Stieda did not publish all of the surviving letters. Rather, he had a whole series of original letters sent from Reval to the Rostock city archives, which he did not later publish and which are still in Rostock today.

Hildebrand Veckinchusen's thirteen trading books, which contain the individual entries of his transactions, were kept in the Reval city archives until the Second World War. It was there that the Russian historian Mikhail P. Lesnikov first inspected the materials in 1940 and received two of the books for transcription in Moscow, where he made complete copies. Lesnikov transcribed the trade books with the archive signatures Af 2 and Af 5 (today the trade books are usually referred to according to their signatures in the Tallinn City Archives catalog published in 1924, which differ in numbering from another catalog from 1896), but without any thought of publication. During the Second World War, all but two of the trade books were taken to Germany and transferred to the Göttingen State Archive Storehouse. Lesnikov made copies of the books Af 1 and Af 6 that remained in Reval at the end of the 1940s; he only found out about the whereabouts of the remaining volumes at the beginning of the 1950s. Finally, in 1959, Heinrich Sproemberg, then chairman of the "Arbeitsgemeinschaft Hansischer Geschichtsverein in der Deutschen Demokratischen Republik", of which Lesnikov had become a member in 1957, suggested that the materials Lesnikov had worked on be printed. In retrospect, Lesnikov himself wrote that it would have been a dereliction of duty to science if he had not "seized the opportunity to open wide the doors to a treasure trove that had been closed for so long, such as the Veckinchusen books are for the economic historian", as the economic-historical significance of the source could not be overestimated. In 1973, the volume Die Handelsbücher des hansischen Kaufmannes Vechinchusen (The Trade Books of the Hanseatic Merchant Vechinchusen) was finally published, an edition of the trade books Af 1 and Af 6, which cover the period between 1399 and 1415. The publication of a second volume with the subsequent trade books Af 13 (up to 1418) and Af 12 (up to 1420) was prevented by Lesnikov's death.

In the meantime, the historian Claus Nordmann, who died in 1942 in the Second World War, had also made copies of Veckinchusen's trade books Af 4, Af 5, Af 7 and Af 8 - independently of Lesnikov. Nordmann reported on this undertaking in an extensive essay published in the Hansische Geschichtsblätter a year before his death. For his work, he used photocopies which are now deposited in the archives of the Hanseatic City of Lübeck and which were made in 1913 when the trade books stored in the Revaler Archive were sent to Germany on the occasion of the International Exhibition for Commercial Education.

Signature catalog Revaler Stadtarchiv from 1924	Record collection Archive of the Hanseatic City of Lübeck	Scope
Af 1	I	144 Bll.
Af 2	II	100 Bll.
Af 3	IVa	38 Bll.
Af 4	VI	85 Bll.
Af 5	Va	12 Bll.
Af 6	III	200 Bll.
Af 7	VIIa	16 Bll.
Af 8	Vb	26 Bll.
Af 9		
Af 10		
Af 11	IIIb	18 Bll.
Af 12		
Af 13	IVb	50 Bll.

Unlike Lesnikov, Nordmann planned to rearrange the individual entries in the trade books for the purpose of publication. In his own edition of the books Af 1 and Af 6, however, Lesnikov argued in favor of a faithful reproduction by pointing out that the Veckinchusen books form two groups according to their form. He described the books Af 1, Af 6, Af 12 and Af 13 as memoranda, in which the entries were made in a rather disjointed manner and apparently did not follow any classification criteria. According to Lesnikov, all other trading books are to be classified as account books, as the individual entries were made according to fixed rules.

In 1982, Walther Stark resumed work on the unpublished trading books, which had been in the Federal Archives in Koblenz since 1978 and had then been lent to Berlin. Although Stark was able to complete the work, the manuscript proved to be unprintable due to the many layers of corrections. For a variety of reasons, the work could not be brought to print for decades. Finally, the edition of the trading books was completed in spring 2013.

The Veckinchusen materials - and here in particular the numerous letters exchanged between the Veckinchusen brothers and their business friends, business partners, journeymen and relatives - also provide ample scope for social-historical research beyond purely economic-historical questions. The letters exchanged between Hildebrand Veckinchusen and his second wife Margarethe are an example of this, about which Rolf Hammel judges that the correspondence "reveals the emotional relationship between married couples at the beginning of the 15th century like no other late medieval testimony." A comprehensive biographical study of Hildebrand Veckinchusen is still pending, but the material for this is now largely available in print.

== World document heritage ==
Veckinchusen's letters and trade books in the Tallinn City Archives are one of the 17 documents on the history of the Hanseatic League that UNESCO added to its World Documentary Heritage List on May 18, 2023. These documents, or in some cases collections of documents, were previously selected at an international congress initiated by the archives of the Hanseatic City of Lübeck and submitted to UNESCO. These are customs books, minutes of meetings, privileges and deeds from the years 1192 to 1547 from six European states.

== Literature ==
Auxiliary means:

- Hans Jeske: Der Fachwortschatz des Hansekaufmanns Hildebrand Veckinchusen. Bielefeld 2005, ISBN 3-89534-591-1

Unpublished sources: Hildebrand Veckinchusen's account books and letters are now in the city archives Tallinn (Tallinna Linnaarhiiv). Fotocopies of the trade books (with the exception of Af 9, Af 10 and Af 12) are available in the archives of the Hanseatic City of Lübeck.

Printed sources:

- Michail P. Lesnikow, Walter Stark (ed.): Die Handelsbücher des Hildebrand Veckinchusen. Account books and other manuals. Final editing by Albrecht Cordes, Cologne/Weimar/Vienna 2013, ISBN 978-3-412-21020-5 (contains the account books Af 2 and 4 and the remaining manuals Af 3, 5, 7–9, 11-13 and the lost manual Af 10, as well as an extensive apparatus).
- Michail P. Lesnikov: Die Handelsbücher des hansischen Kaufmanns Veckinchusen. Berlin 1973 (contains the books Af 1 and Af 6, which follow each other in chronological order; covers the years between 1399 and 1415 - see also the review by Ahasver von Brandt: Die Veckinchusen-Handlungsbücher. Prehistory, problems and realization of a source edition. In: Hansische Geschichtsblätter 93 (1975), ISSN 0073-0327, pp. 100–112).
- Wilhelm Stieda (Hrsg.): Hildebrand Veckinchusen. Briefwechsel eines deutschen Kaufmanns im 15. Jahrhundert, Leipzig 1921 (contains 546 pieces).
- Wilhelm Stieda: Hansisch-Venetianische Handelsbeziehungen im 15. Jahrhundert, Rostock 1894 (contains 31 letters from Hildebrand and Sivert Veckinchusen from the years between 1411 and 1429).
- Wilhelm Stieda: Ein Geldgeschäft Kaiser Sigismunds mit hansischen Kaufleuten. In: Hansische Geschichtsblätter 16 (1887), ISSN 0073-0327, p. 61–82 (contains four letters).

Representations:

- Thorsten Afflerbach: Der berufliche Alltag eines spätmittelalterlichen Hansekaufmanns: Betrachtungen zur Abwicklung von Handelsgeschäften. Frankfurt am Main [u. a.] 1993, ISBN 3-631-45737-5
- Albrecht Cordes: Spätmittelalterlicher Gesellschaftshandel im Hanseraum (Quellen und Darstellungen zur hansischen Geschichte N.F. 45). Köln / Weimar / Wien 1997, ISBN 3-412-03698-6 (including the chapter Books and Letters of the Veckinchusen brothers, pp. 233–260).
- Albrecht Cordes: Die Veckinchusen-Quellen und ihre weitere Erforschung. Ein faszinierendes und sperriges Stück Kaufmannsgeschichte, in: Jürgen Sarnowsky (Hg.), Konzeptionelle Überlegungen zur Edition von Rechnungen und Amtsbüchern des späten Mittelalters, Göttingen 2016, 73–90.
- Rolf Hammel: Hildebrand Veckinchusen. In: Biographisches Lexikon für Schleswig-Holstein und Lübeck. Band 9. Neumünster 1991, ISBN 3-529-02649-2 S. 358–364.
- Rolf Hammel-Kiesow (2016). "Veckinchusen, Hildebrand". Neue Deutsche Biographie (in German). Vol. 26. Berlin: Duncker & Humblot. p. 724. (full text online).
- Franz Irsigler: Der Alltag einer hansischen Kaufmannsfamilie im Spiegel der Veckinchusen-Briefe. In: Hansische Geschichtsblätter 103 (1985), ISSN 0073-0327 S. 75–99.
- Walter Stark: Untersuchungen zum Profit beim hansischen Handelskapital in der ersten Hälfte des 15. Jahrhunderts. Weimar 1985.
- Margot Lindemann: Nachrichtenübermittlung durch Kaufmannsbriefe. Brief-„Zeitungen“ in der Korrespondenz Hildebrand Veckinchusens (1398–1428). München [u. a.] 1978, ISBN 3-7940-2526-1
- Franz Irsigler: Hansekaufleute. Die Lübecker Veckinchusen und die Kölner Rinck. In: Hanse in Europa: Brücke zwischen den Märkten, 12.–17. Jahrhundert. Köln 1973, p. 301–312.
- Franz Irsigler: Kaufmannsmentalität im Mittelalter. In: Cord Meckseper und Elisabeth Schraut (Hrsg.): Mentalität und Altag im Spätmittelalter. 2. Auflage. Göttingen 1991, ISBN 3-525-33511-3, p. 68 f.
- Michail P. Lesnikov: Der hansische Pelzhandel zu Beginn des 15. Jahrhunderts. In: Hansische Studien. Heinrich Sproemberg zum 70. Geburtstag (Forschungen zur mittelalterlichen Geschichte 8). Berlin 1961, p. 219–272.
- Stephan Selzer und Ulf Christian Ewert: Verhandeln und Verkaufen, Vernetzen und Vertrauen: Über die Netzwerkstruktur des Hansischen Handels. In: Hansische Geschichtsblätter 119 (2001), p. 135–161.
- Luise von Winterfeld: Hildebrand Veckinchusen: ein hansischer Kaufmann vor 500 Jahren. Bremen 1929(Luise von Winterfeld's study is more of a popular science and not always accurate in its presentation of the facts).
