= Ratzon Arusi =

Israeli chief rabbi

Rabbi Dr. Ratson Arusi רצון ערוסי
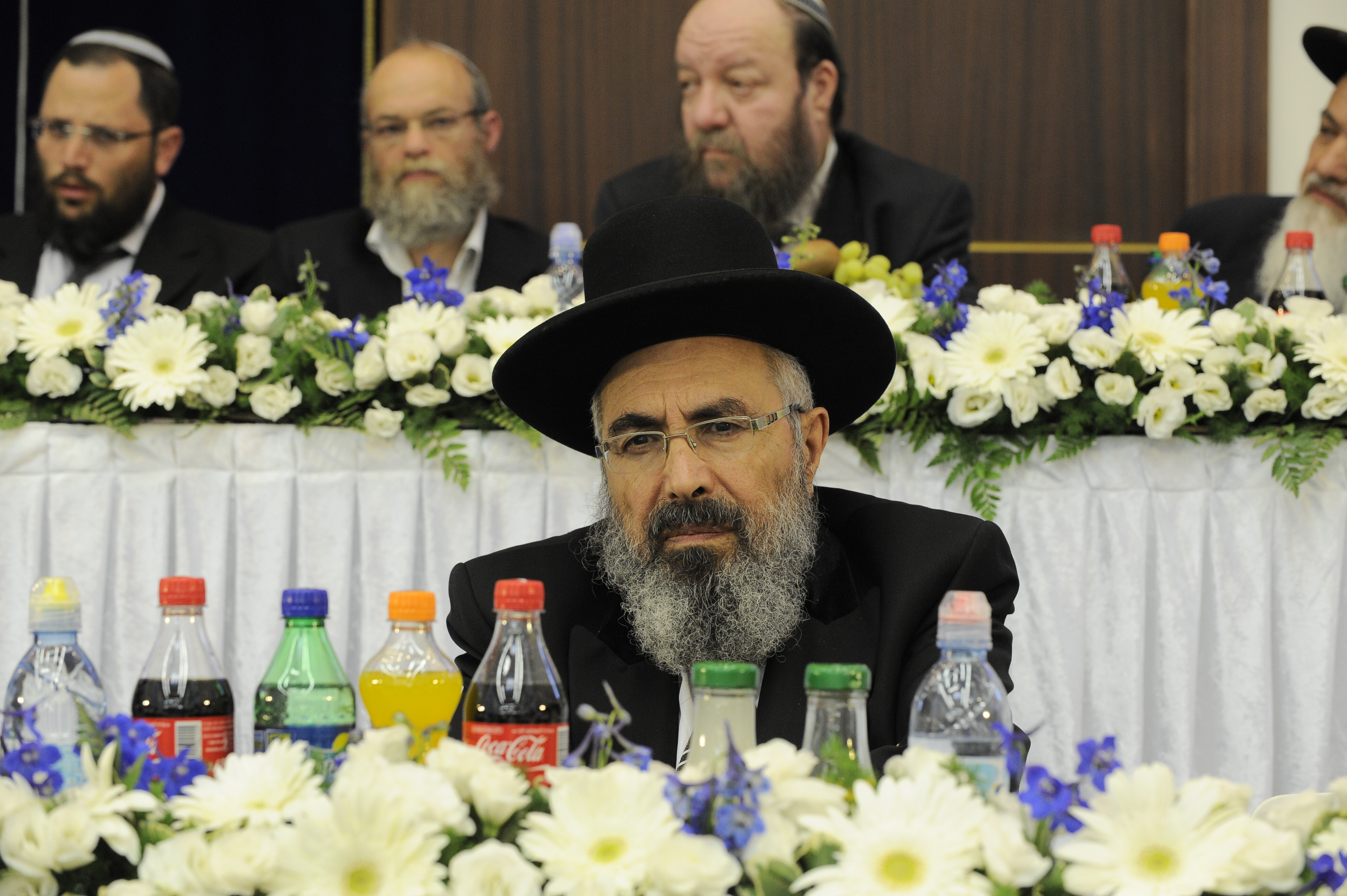
- Rabbi Ratson Arusi at the Jerusalem Day ceremony at Yeshivat Merkaz HaRav, 2015.

Religious life
- Religion: Judaism

Ratzon Halevi Arusi (Hebrew: רצון ערוסי) is the Chief Rabbi of the city of Kiryat Ono, Israel, member of the Council of the Chief Rabbinate of Israel, Founder and chairman of the organization Halichot Am Yisrael, and President of Machon Mishnat Ha-Rambam. He has a PhD in law from Tel Aviv University, and was a lecturer in Mishpat Ivri at Bar Ilan University. He is the winner of the Katz Prize for 2019. He is considered the primary disciple of Rabbi Yosef Qafih (Kapach).

== Biography ==
Halevi was born in 1944, Sanaa, Yemen, to Yosef and Sa’ada. His grandfather Avraham was a student of Rabbis Yiḥyah Qafiḥ and Yihye Avitch, and was one of the wealthy and important communal leaders in the city of Sanaa. In 1949, he made aliyah to Israel with his family. They arrived at the Aliyah Camp in Ein Shemer, and there his Payot (“simonim”) were cut by the kindergarten teachers from Hashomer Hatzair. Subsequently, the family moved to the immigrant moshav of Kadima, and eventually resided in Ramat Gan.

He studied at Yeshivat Hadarom and Hebron Yeshiva. He also studied with Rabbi David ‘Awich, the rabbi of the community in Ramat Amidar, and with Rabbi Yosef Qafih (Kapach) and is considered his primary disciple. He served in the IDF, and as an officer in the reserves.

He received a Bachelor’s degree in Law at Bar-Ilan University, and a Master’s and Doctorate from Tel Aviv University. His doctoral dissertation was submitted with the title “Halachic decision-making regarding conflict of laws due to inter-communal differences” in September 1987.

He taught at the vocational yeshiva high school in Kfar Tzvi Sitrin and the religious high school Shakdiel-Lod. In the past he served as a lecturer in Mishpat Ivri at Bar Ilan University. He received his rabbinical ordination from the past Chief Rabbis, Rabbi Mordechai Eliyahu and Rabbi Avraham Shapira, Rabbi Yechezkel Sarna, the Rosh yeshiva of Hebron Yeshiva, Rabbi Yosef Kapach, Rabbi Ovadia Yosef, and Rabbi Meir Mazuz.

In 1985 he was a member of the public committee on the “Disappearance of Yemenite children”. At the end of the 1980s he worked with the “Public Committee for the Jews of Yemen” to bring the remainder of the Jewish community of Yemen to Israel.

In 1987, he was chosen to serve as the Chief Rabbi of Kiryat Ono. Starting in 2003, he has been a member of the Council of the Chief Rabbinate of Israel. He serves as the chair of the Marriage Committee and the chair of the Committee for Interfaith Dialogue. In 2013, he announced his candidacy for the position of Rishon LeZion (Sefardi Chief Rabbi), but withdrew before the elections.

He is a member of the rabbinic leadership of the organization “Hotam”, and serves as the president of Achva.

== Philosophy and Public Activity ==
Rabbi Arusi works to adapt Jewish civil law (Mishpat Ivri) to be applied to the modern reality. He is the chairman of “Halichot Am Yisrael”, which conducts lectures and conferences in the field. It has also established a kollel for training rabbis and judges, and a Beit Din for monetary law, based on the Israeli law of arbitration, in Kiryat Ono.

His philosophy in Halakha is to follow the position of the Rambam, disseminating the Rambam's philosophy in his regular classes in Kiryat Ono, and general lectures throughout Israel. In this framework, he also serves as the president of Mekhon Mishnat ha-Rambam.

After the passing of Rabbi Yosef Kapach in July 2000, many view Rabbi Arusi as the outstanding figure in the movement among Yemenite Jews and others who follow the halakhic rulings of the Rambam. When asked about the “Dardaim”—Jews who only follow the position of the Rambam and negate the Torah position of the Kabbalah—he stated that only fringe figures deny the book of the Zohar.

== Personal life ==
Rabbi Arusi is married to Sarah, of the Ozeri family, and the father of 7. His son, Rabbi Tzefania Arusi is the rabbi of a community in Modiin.
