= International Farming Systems Collection =

Collection within the University of Florida Digital Collections

The International Farming Systems Digital Collection within the University of Florida Digital Collections includes teaching, research, and extension resources related to the Farming Systems approach to international agricultural development.

The collection materials come from the personal library of Peter E. Hildebrand who is a founder of Farming Systems. The collection's focus includes materials that supported putting farmers first and increasing number of smallholder farmers and their heterogeneous livelihood systems on a global scale. One of the two core areas covered is the development over time of methods that help development professionals understand the livelihood of smallholder farming and its limited resource households. The second core area includes literature describing the diverse livelihood strategies of the households living in various parts of the world. These limited resource households represent nearly a billion people struggling to survive on a daily basis.
