= Dernburg =

Dernburg is a surname. Notable people with the surname include:

- Abby Dernburg, American biologist
- Bernhard Dernburg (1865–1937), German politician and banker
- Ernst Dernburg (1887–1969), German actor
- Friedrich Dernburg (1833-1911), German author
- Heinrich Dernburg (1829–1907), German jurist, professor, and politician
