= Bracha Qafih =

Israeli rabbanit and social worker

- ברכה קאפח
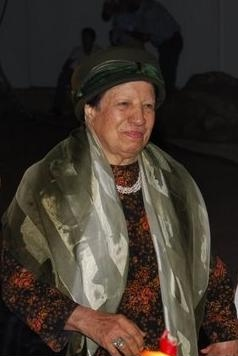
- Bracha Kapach
- Born: 1922; Yemen
- Died: November 23, 2013 (aged 90–91); Israel
- Other name: Bracha Kapach
- Occupation: Rabbanit
- Known for: Philanthropy and Tzedakah
- Spouse: Yosef Qafih
- Awards: Israel Prize (1999)

Bracha Qafih also known as Bracha Kapach (Hebrew: ברכה קאפח; 1922 – 26 November 2013) was an Israeli rabbanit, wife of Rabbi Yosef Qafih, who was awarded the Israel Prize for her charitable work.

== Early life ==
Bracha was born in Yemen, into the Saleh family. She was married to her first cousin, Yosef Qafih, at the age of eleven. Seven years later, they immigrated to Palestine with their three children, one of whom died on the way. Another son, Arieh, was born in Palestine.

== Social work ==
Qafih’s first enterprise in the country was running an embroidery workshop employing 50 Yemenite women. For over half a century, she organized holiday food packages for the needy of Jerusalem. The food was packaged by student volunteers and distributed from her home in Nahlaot. Qafih also collected old wedding gowns to loan to brides from poor families.

== Awards and recognition ==
In 1999, Kapach was awarded the Israel Prize for her special contributions to society and the State of Israel. Kapach and her husband are the only married couple to have both won the Israel Prize.

In 2018, a street in her Jerusalem neighborhood of Nahlaot was renamed in her honor, alongside her husband.

Her biography is included Danny Siegel's 1998 volume Munbaz II and Other Mitzvah Heroes and his 2020 anthology Radiance: Creative Mitzvah Living. It is also expounded in a 2005 Hebrew work called V'zot HaBracha (literally: "and this is the blessing") by Yael Shai. There is also a Hebrew children's book about her and her husband called Ankei HaTorah Ve-haḤesed ("The Giants of Torah and Chesed") by Noam and Shira Nagrober, as part of the "Gedolei HaUmah" ("Great Ones of the People") series.
