= Johann Hildebrandt =

Johann Hildebrandt may refer to:

- Johann Lukas von Hildebrandt (1668–1745), Austrian architect
- Johann Maria Hildebrandt (1847–1881), German explorer
- Johann Hildebrand (1614–1684), German composer
- Johann Gottfried Hildebrandt (1720s–1775), German organ builder
