= Derenbourg =

Derenbourg is a surname derived from Derenburg. Notable people with the surname include:

- Hartwig Derenbourg (1844–1908), French orientalist
- Joseph Derenbourg (1811–1895), French-German orientalist

== See also ==
- Dernburg
