= Bauhaus (magazine) =

Arts magazine in Germany (1926–1931)

- Categories: Arts magazine; Design magazine
- Founded: 1926
- First issue: December 1926
- Final issue: 1931
- Country: Germany
- Language: German

Bauhaus was a quarterly avant-garde art and design magazine which existed in the period between 1926 and 1931 with some interruptions. It was launched by a German art movement with the same name and financed by an art group called Kreis der Freunde des Bauhauses (German: Circle of Friends of the Bauhaus). It had significant effects on the Danish art magazines such as Kritisk Revy and Linien.

== History ==
Bauhaus was started on 24 December 1926 when a new Bauhaus building in Dessau was opened. It targeted professional designers and those who were interested in design and contained articles supplemented with photographic prints and layouts. The magazine emphasized the democratic elements in art and design. In 1926 it featured Marcel Breuer’s filmstrip which indicated a change in the tendency of the Bauhaus group towards the functionalism.

In 1928 five issues of the magazine were edited by Martin Gropius and László Moholy-Nagy. Then the Swiss architect Hannes Meyer and Ernő Kállai became its editors. Joost Schmidt modified the original logo of the magazine designed by Herbert Bayer. Main contributors of the magazine included Hans Hildenbrand who published articles on wall painting and relief, and architect Ludwig Hilberseimer. Bauhaus folded in late 1931.

== See also ==
- List of avant-garde magazines
