= Johanne Hildebrandt =

Swedish journalist and novelist

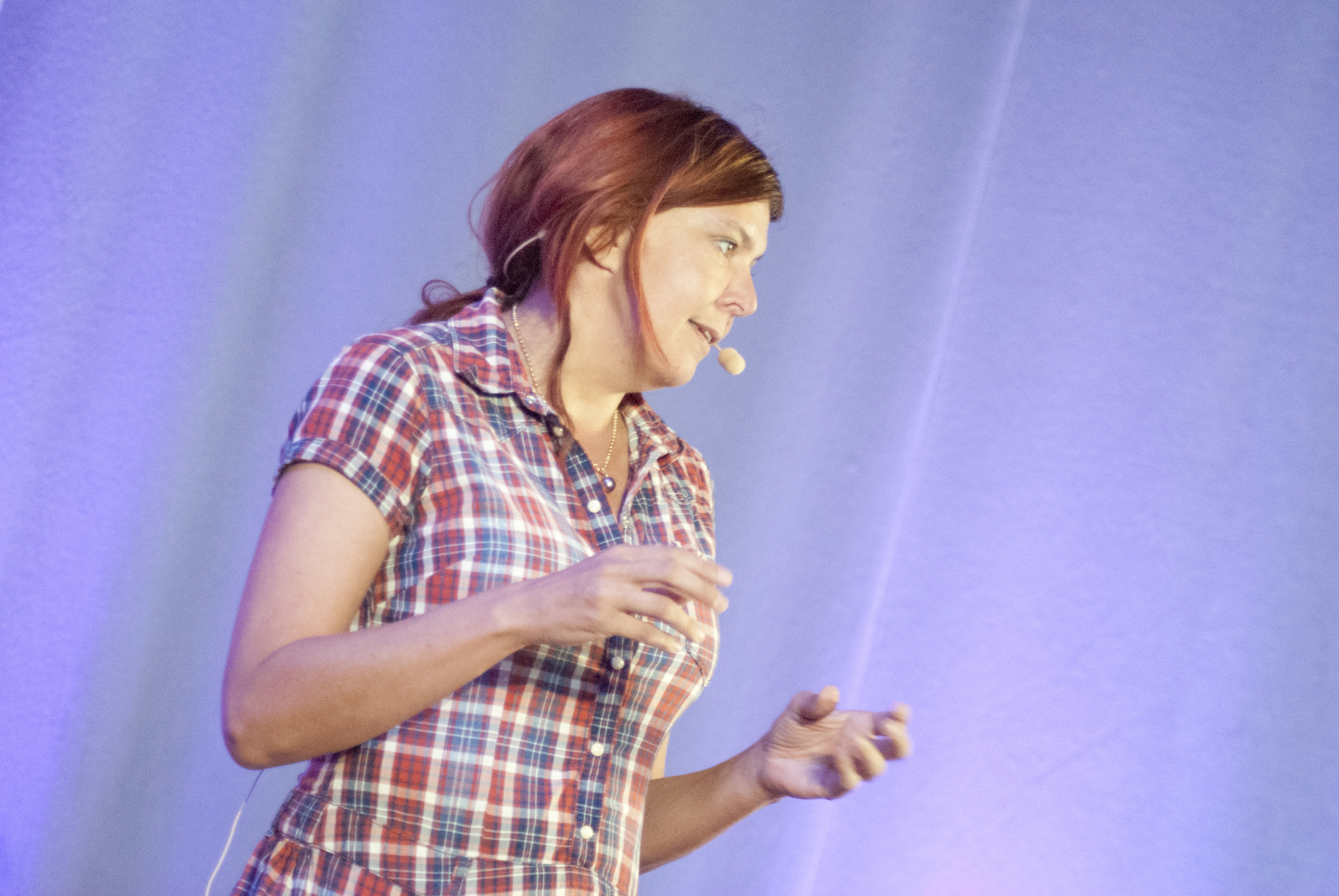
- Born: Anna Inger Johanne Fredriksson; April 15, 1964 (age 62); Lycksele, Sweden
- Writing career
- Notable awards: Guldspaden 2002

Johanne Hildebrandt (born 15 April 1964) is a Swedish journalist and novelist. She has authored ten books.

== Life ==
While on a vacation in Croatia during the early 1990s the Yugoslav Wars broke out, and she decided to become a war correspondent. In 2001 she published Blackout detailing her experiences in the Balkans over the course of ten years. The book landed her the Guldspaden award the following year. Her breakthrough as a novelist came with the Story of Valhalla (Sagan om Valhalla) trilogy originally published in 2002 to 2004. After a tour in Afghanistan, which resulted in the 2010 book Krigare ("Warriors"), she retired from being a war correspondent to instead focus on writing novels and columns.

In 2012 she was elected to the Royal Swedish Academy of War Sciences, department 1, as the first woman since its founding in 1796. Her The Unbroken Line of the Moon (originally published in Swedish as Sigfrid), is to be published in English.
