= World Achva Association =

Orthodox Jewish secret society

The World Achva Association (Hebrew: אחווה) is an international Orthodox Jewish fraternity or secret society. It was founded in 1895 to provide mutual assistance and the real existence of the Mitzvah or "Love your neighbor as yourself". Its world headquarters is located in Jerusalem from the association's establishment to the present.

== History ==
The first bureau of The World Achva Association was founded in Jerusalem to unify with Israel, develop the education, improve the morals of the people, and help the needy. The association to help friends, called "brothers", who are moral but financially weak. The association helped the brothers find jobs and provided credit.

After the establishment of the branch in Jerusalem, opened branches in Jaffa, Tel Aviv, Safed, Tiberias, Hebron, Petah Tikva, Haifa, New York City and London. In recent decades, the association activity in Israel almost completely diminished and most of the activities currently being branches in Australia, England, Argentina, United States, Brazil, South Africa, France and Canada.

Fraternity brothers are divided into four different levels.

== Achva neighborhood ==
In 1899, the Achva neighborhood was founded in Jaffa, south-west of Neve Tzedek and to the Neve Shalom, by Elijah Aharon Kahana. In 1905, the Association Talmud Torah was established in Jaffa. In 1908, it had eighty students. The name of the institution changed to "Tachkemoni", and it prepared a plan which included secondary studies.

In 1906, some members of the Achva Neighborhood Association purchased land in Jerusalem in the name of two members to build the Achva neighborhood. The construction work was entrusted to the members of the Association of Contractors, Abraham Hamburger, and his in-law, Jacob Moses. Two years later, the Achva neighborhood was established. It is located between the Jerusalem Zichron Moshe and the Street Kings of Israel.

The neighborhood's book of regulations state, "We have come to the Soviet drive us the seat change and twenty houses, a house and a yard each, with synagogue built as loud to the Torah and to the prayer ... and called colony name Rates brotherhood, for the will We name a good sign that this project will have as big gate wide open."
