= Hildebrand (bishop of Sées) =

Hildebrand or Hadobrandus (died 884×7) was the bishop of Sées from 849.

In 856 Hildebrand attended a local assembly at Neaufles summoned by the king, Charles the Bald, and his heir, Louis the Stammerer. At the time Hildebrand and one Betto were serving as the king's local representatives (missi). He attended the synod of Soissons in 857.

When Sées was threatened by Vikings, Hildebrand fled to Moussy-le-Neuf with the relics of Saint Opportuna.

== Sources ==
- Nelson, J. L. (1992). Charles the Bald. London: Longman.
- Smith, Julia M. H. (2009). "Pilgrimage and Spiritual Healing in the Ninth Century". In Rubin, Miri (ed.). Medieval Christianity in Practice. Princeton University Press. pp. 222–30.
