= Hans Hildenbrand =

German photographer

- Born: 1870; Bad Boll, Kingdom of Württemberg, German Empire
- Died: 1957 (aged 86–87)
- Occupation: Photographer

Hans Hildenbrand (1870–1957) was a German photographer who was famous for taking color photographs during World War I. His French counterpart is considered Jules Gervais-Courtellemont. Hildenbrand published articles to the art and design magazine Bauhaus in the late 1920s. He worked as a photographer for National Geographic after the war.

== Exhibitions and book ==
Together with pictures of his French colleague Jules Gervais-Courtellemont, Hildenbrand's war photographs were on display in 2009 in the exhibition "Endzeit Europa" in the Kurt Tucholsky Literature Museum in Rheinsberg and then in the House of Brandenburg-Prussian History in Potsdam. The exhibition was to be shown at a total of five German locations (in addition to Rheinsberg and Potsdam, Finsterwalde, Erkner and Oranienburg) and five French locations. A book containing a collection of statements by contemporary witnesses was published to accompany the exhibition. As early as 2007, on the occasion of the centenary of color photography, numerous pictures by Hildenbrand were shown in the Municipal Gallery of Erlangen. The large monograph Hans Hildenbrand was published in autumn 2018. Court photographer and pioneer of early color photography, published by the House of History, Baden-Württemberg. From March 31, 2019, the Stadthaus Ulm showed the exhibition "It's getting colorful! Hans Hildenbrand and the first color photos of Ulm."
