= David K. Hildebrand =

American music historian

David K. Hildebrand is a freelance performer, lecturer, recording artist, and longtime partner of Ginger Hildebrand (since 1980); he is an adjunct instructor at the Peabody Conservatory, and a widely recognized scholar of early American music history, including that of the colonial, Revolutionary, Federal and War of 1812 periods. He has focused especially on the music of Maryland. His dissertation was on the colonial music of Annapolis, and his masters thesis on musical instruments in that region up to the American Revolution.

Dr. Hildebrand earned his undergraduate degree from Dickinson College, and his M.A. and Ph.D. are both in musicology, from George Washington University and The Catholic University of America, respectively. Both solo and with wife Ginger, David appears regularly at Mount Vernon, the National Gallery of Art, Colonial Williamsburg and at colleges, universities, and primary schools around the country. He has written reviews and reader reports for The New Grove Dictionary of Music and Musicians, American Music, Oxford University Press, Maryland Historical Magazine, The William & Mary Quarterly, Sea History Magazine, ECCB: The Eighteenth-Century Current Bibliography and The Sonneck Society for American Music Bulletin.

David appears at scholarly conferences, consults, and offers teacher workshops and children's programs. In 2012, he produced and narrated a one-hour national public radio special on music, now released on "Music of the war of 1812" and he is the lead music historian for the nationally broadcast documentary film, "Anthem," the story behind "The Star-Spangled Banner." David and Ginger Hildebrand have released seven full-length CD recordings (see below).

== Bibliography ==
- Hildebrand, David; Elizabeth Schaaf. Musical Maryland: Three Centuries of Song in the Land of Pleasant Living. Johns Hopkins University Press, 2017.
- Music of the War of 1812 - Narrated One-Hour Radio Program & Twenty American Songs, Marches and Dance Tunes; double audio CD recording (2012, Colonial Music Institute, CMI H-107 & 108).
- Music in the Life of Benjamin Franklin – produced also in conjunction with Julianne Baird to honor the 300th anniversary of Franklin’s birth. A full-length recording (and companion music book) features vocal and instrumental music, including extensive historical background notes, a list of instruments and sources, and a selection-by-selection discussion of the music (2006, Colonial Music Institute, CMI H-106).
- George Washington: Music for the First President – conceived in conjunction with Kate Van Winkle Keller for Mount Vernon, this full-length recording (and companion music book) features vocal and instrumental music, including extensive historical background notes, a list of instruments and sources, and a selection-by-selection discussion of the music (1999, Hildebrands’ Studio, H-105).
- Physics Pholk Songs . . . and other Scienterrific Ditties -- a full-length compact disc recording of both vocal and instrumental music, including new compositions and arrangements of others’ works. Sponsored by the Dickinson College Physics Department and funded by the National Science Foundation (1998, Hildebrands’ Studio, H-104 or SE-7130).
- Music of the Charles Carroll Family, 1785-1832 -- a full-length compact disc recording of both vocal and instrumental chamber music from the library of one of Maryland's four signers of the Declaration of Independence (1991, Albany Records, TROY056 or H-103).
- Over the Hills and Far Away, Being A Collection of Music from 18th-Century Annapolis -- a topical collection of pre-Revolutionary music, based on research for doctoral dissertation, as described above. Also includes extensive historical background notes, a list of instruments and sources, and a selection-by-selection discussion of the music (1990, Albany Records, TROY042 or H-102).
- Out On A Limb—Traditional Folk Music -- a collection of international folk music selected and arranged for duet/small ensemble (1984, H101).
