= Heinrich Sproemberg =

German medievalist and historian of modern age (1889–1966)

- Born: Heinrich Friedrich Adolf Emanuel Sproemberg; 25 November 1889; Berlin, Germany
- Died: 19 June 1966 (aged 76); East Berlin, East Germany
- Education: Frederick William University, Berlin
- Occupations: Historian & author
- Spouse: Liselotte "Lily" Krüger (1909-1990)
- Children: Heinz-Christoph Sproemberg
- Parent(s): Alfred Sproemberg (1857-1903); Elisabeth Dernburg (1864-1946)

Heinrich Sproemberg (25 November 1889 – 19 June 1966) was a German historian. The focus of his research was on the transition from the Middle Ages to the Early modern period. He made a notable contribution to the historiography of the Hanseatic League, the Netherlands and the territories that became known after 1830 as Belgium.

== Life ==
Heinrich Friedrich Adolf Emanuel Sproemberg was born into a reformed-evangelical family in Berlin. Alfred Sproemberg (1857-1903) was an architect who later became a building inspector. His mother, Elisabeth Dernburg (1864-1946), came from a family of academics. Her father (Heinrich's maternal grandfather) was the law professor Heinrich Dernburg (1829-1907).

Following his father's relatively early death Heinrich Sproemberg went to live with his grandfather. It was now that he decided to concentrate his further academic studies on history. He attended the "Empress Augusta [secondary] school" ("Kaiserin-Augusta-Gymnasium" - as the "Ludwig-Cauer-Grundschule" was then known), and passed his school final exams ("Abitur") in 1909 which opened the way to a university education. He moved on to the Frederick William University (as the Humboldt was then known) where he studied History, Applied Economics ("Nationalökonomie") and Jurisprudence. His teachers included Dietrich Schäfer, Michael Tangl and Otto Hintze. For his subsidiary module on Applied Economics he was taught by Gustav Schmoller. He received his doctorate in 1914 for work on the eleventh century Bishopric of Liège. The work was supervised by Dietrich Schäfer. However, after war broke out at the end of July 1914 there was a major falling out with Schäfer. The German High Command implemented war plans that included a rapid invasion of Belgium which was accompanied by persistent reports of widescale atrocities by German troops against Belgian civilians. Sproemberg was at pains to distance himself from Schäfer's "annexationist" support for German policy in respect of Belgium.

Between 1914 and 1919 Sproemberg took part in the war, first as a nurse and working later in the press office of the High Command. His special assignment here involved gathering and reviewing relevant news items from the Belgian newspapers. After the war the position he had taken against the annexation of Belgium hindered his professional advancement within the university establishment, but he was able to obtain work as a private tutor. Between 1926 and 1931 he was also working for the Hansische Umschau, a specialist academic journal of the Hanseatic History Association ("Hansischer Geschichtsverein"). After about 1930 he also worked to promote the exchange of reading material between German-speaking historians and institutions in France, Belgium and the Netherlands. The idea originated at a meeting of the French Institute in Berlin and was seen as a response to the retreat into individual nationally defined intellectual trenches that had only intensified since 1918. In 1929 the noted Medievalist Robert Holtzmann moved to the Berlin institute, and saw that Sproemberg was ideally placed to support the German end of the operation because of the extensive network of suitable contacts he had built up during more than ten years as a well regarded private tutor. The so-called "Organisation for the exchange of academic publications" ("Organisation zum Austausch wissenschaftlicher Publikationen") placed Sproemberg at the heart of a supportive communications network distinguished academic historians that included Marc Bloch. Applying a loose organisational structure, by the mid-1930s more than 350 titles were being exchanged each year between Paris and Berlin, as well as with a partner operation in Ghent. However, the continuing growth in state mandated nationalism in Germany itself caused these activities to falter in 1935 and to end in 1936.

In January 1933, following months of political deadlock in parliament (the "Reichstag"), the Nazis took power and lost no time in transforming Germany into a one-party dictatorship. The Nazi party had gained popular support on the back of the traditional twin populist pillars of hatred and hope, and in government both were integrated into government strategy. At some stage the authorities determined that on his mother's side Heinrich Sproemberg had Jewish ancestry and during the later 1930s he found himself denounced as a non-Aryan and a "Mixed-blood". He had been brought up in a Protestant family and became a member of the anti-Nazi Confessing Church during the Nazi years. As matters turned out he was not subjected to the extreme forms of persecution inflicted with increasing savagery on those identified as Jews or Communists, but during the twelve Nazi years his life was nevertheless increasingly constricted. Starting in 1933 he began to accept invitations to appear as a guest lecturer at universities in Belgium and the Netherlands. Back in Berlin he also worked between 1934 and 1947 for the "Hansische Geschichtsblätter" which had emerged from the residuum of the defunct "Hansische Umschau". He also wrote. While opportunities to publish were increasingly closed off to him in Germany, he found "solidarity" in Belgium where his study "Judith, Königin von England, Gräfin von Flandern" ("Judith, Queen of England, Countess of Flanders") was published in 1936, followed in 1939 by "Das Erwachen des Staatsgefühls in den Niederlanden. Galbert von Brügge" ("The awakening of national consciousness in the Netherlands, Galbert of Bruges"). However, he appears to have encountered further difficulties having his work published after the war broke out in September 1939, and works believed to have been ready for publication during the early 1940s appeared, if at all, only after war ended in May 1945.

In 1943 he was bombed out of his Berlin home. With his family he moved to Badersleben, a small village in the flat countryside between Magdeburg and Hanover. Halle was (and is) some 100 km to the south-east. After war ended in May 1945 he was briefly employed in local civil administration, at one stage given charge of the "culture department" in nearby Halberstadt, and then being moved to the regional administration centre in Halle. The war's end had seen what remained of Germany divided into four military occupation zones (with separate, more complicated, provision made for the administration of Berlin itself). Badersleben and Halberstadt were near the western extremity of a large central region administered, like Halle, as parts of the Soviet occupation zone, which would be relaunched in October 1949 as the Soviet sponsored German Democratic Republic (East Germany). It was in this version of Germany that Heinrich Sproemberg lived out the rest of life and built for himself a late flowering career as a university professor. Headhunted by Robert Holtzmann and Heinrich Mitteis, between 1945 and 1946 he was employed as a lecturer in Medieval and Modern History at the University of Halle. Sproemberg moved to Rostock in 1946, holding a teaching chair as professor in Medieval and Modern History until 1950, also identified during this period as "seminar director". Arriving at Rostock at a time of intense reconstruction, he engaged in a root and branch renewal in terms of personnel and teaching methods.

His career peaked after 1950 when he transferred to Leipzig where the faculty had been attempting to lure him away from Rostock since 1947. Again, he held a professorship and teaching chair in Medieval and Modern History. He held his position at Leipzig in succession to Rudolf Kötzschke who had died in 1949. He established a number of important new initiatives. Along with the professorship, he also inherited from Kötzschke charge of the Regional History Institute ("Landesgeschichtliche Institut") for Saxony. After the individual states ("Lander") were dissolved as separate administrative units in 1952, this became the only surviving regional historical institute of its kinds in the German Democratic Republic. However, following further reorganisation at the university, in 1957 Sproemberg lost his position in charge of it. Other notable contributions included the creation, in 1955, of East Germany's Hanseatic Working Group. Nevertheless, as one of those academics, who also included Ernst Bloch, who resolutely refused to involve themselves in politics or become members of government sponsored quasi-political organisations, he became increasingly vulnerable to attacks. His "Contributions to Belgian-Dutch history" ("Beiträge zur belgisch-niederländischen Geschichte") was rejected for publication as "not Marxist" in 1957 (though it was eventually published two years later).

In 1958 Heinrich Sproemberg retired from his university posts.

== Celebration ==
In 1965, the year before he died, the University of Rostock conferred on Sproemberg an honorary doctorate. The accompanying citation described him as "an important researcher of the history of the middle ages, and especially of Hanseatic history, and a supporter of the next generation of academics" ("bedeutender Erforscher der Geschichte des Mittelalters, insbesondere der hansischen Geschichte, Förderer des wissenschaftlichen Nachwuchses").

== Output (selection) ==
- Beiträge zur französisch-flandrischen Geschichte. Ebering, Berlin 1931
- Die Entstehung der Grafschaft Flandern. Ebering, Berlin 1935
- Beiträge zur belgisch-niederländischen Geschichte. Berlin 1959 (Forschungen zur mittelalterlichen Geschichte, vol. 3)
- Mittelalter und demokratische Geschichtsschreibung. Ausgewählte Abhandlungen. Berlin 1971 (Forschungen zur mittelalterlichen Geschichte, vol. 18)
