= Heinrich Dernburg =

German jurist (1829–1907)

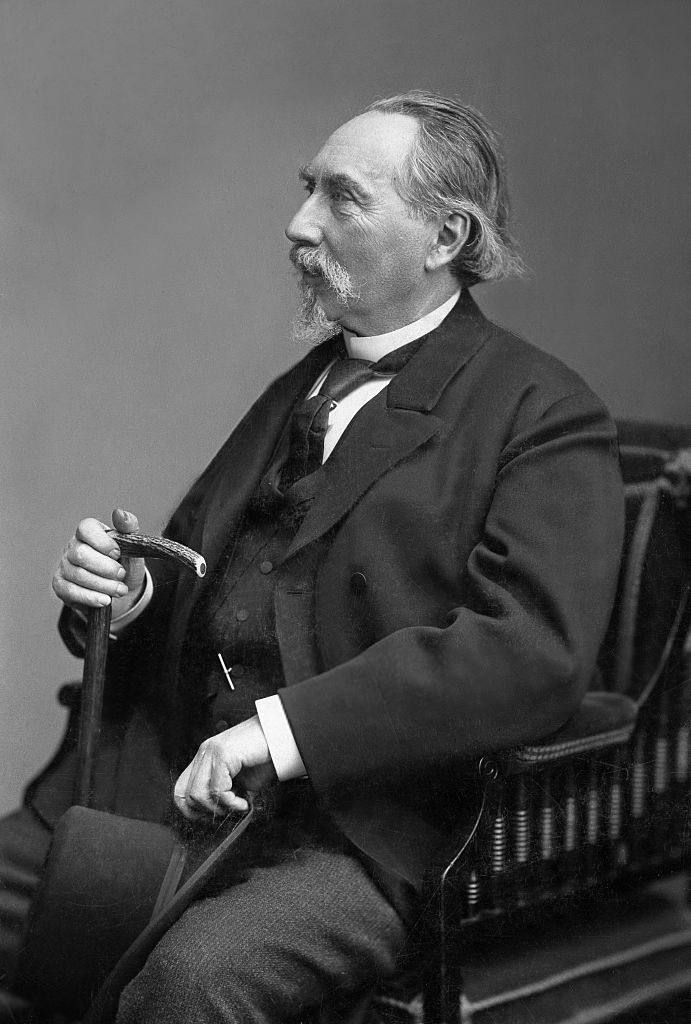
- Born: 3 March 1829; Mainz, Hesse, Germany
- Died: 23 November 1907 (aged 78); Charlottenburg, Prussia, Germany
- Occupation: Jurist
- Father: Jacob Dernburg
- Relatives: Friedrich Dernburg (brother)

Heinrich Dernburg (3 March 1829 – 23 November 1907) was a German jurist, professor, and politician. Born in Mainz, Grand Duchy of Hesse, he was the brother of Friedrich Dernburg and the maternal grandfather of the historian Heinrich Sproemberg.

Dernburg was born on 3 March 1829 in Mainz. Of Jewish origin, Dernburg was baptized as a Christian together with his family in 1841. He was educated at the gymnasium of Mainz and the universities of Gießen and Berlin, graduating from the latter in 1851. In the same year he became Privat-docent of the juridical faculty of the University of Heidelberg. In 1852 he was called to Zürich as assistant professor, and was appointed professor in 1855. In 1862 he accepted a similar position in the University of Halle, which he represented in the Prussian House of Lords from 1866 to 1873, when he became professor of Roman and Prussian law in the University of Berlin. He reentered the Herrenhaus in 1873. With Brinckmann and others he founded in 1851 the Kritische Zeitschrift für die Gesammte Rechtswissenschaft.

Dernburg was one of the leading experts for Prussian civil law as codified in the ALR. His work sought to keep a balance between "mercantile interests" and "social utopias". Unlike other Pandect scholars of his time, Dernburg was never accused of advocating a doctrinary and reactionary form of legal positivism.

He died on 23 November 1907 in Berlin-Charlottenburg.

== Works ==
Among his works may be mentioned:

- Dernburg, Heinrich (1854). Die Compensation nach römischem Rechte: mit Rücksicht auf die neueren Gesetzgebungen dargestellt (in German). Heidelberg: Bangel & Schmitt. 2d ed., 1868.
- Dernburg, Heinrich (1860). Das Pfandrecht nach den Grundsätzen des heutigen römischen Rechts (in German). Vol. I. Leipzig: Hirzel. OCLC 175041095.
- Dernburg, Heinrich (1860). Das Pfandrecht nach den Grundsätzen des heutigen römischen Rechts (in German). Vol. II. Leipzig: Hirzel. OCLC 175120639.
- Dernburg, Heinrich (1869). Die Institutionen des Gajus: Ein Collegienheft aus d. Jahre 161 nach Christi Geburt. Festschrift (in German). Halle: Verlag der Buchhandlung des Waisenhauses.
- Dernburg, Heinrich (1875). Lehrbuch des preussischen Privatrechts und der Privatrechtsnormen des Reichs (in German). Vol. I. Halle: Verlag der Buchhandlung des Waisenhauses. OCLC 163355763.
- Dernburg, Heinrich (1878). Lehrbuch des preussischen Privatrechts und der Privatrechtsnormen des Reichs (in German). Vol. II. Halle: Verlag der Buchhandlung des Waisenhauses. OCLC 163355777.
- Dernburg, Heinrich (1875). Das Vormundschaftsrecht der preußischen Monarchie nach der Vormundschaftsordnung vom 5. Juli 1875 (in German) (1 ed.). Berlin: Guttentag. OCLC 45658188.
  - Dernburg, Heinrich (1876). Das Vormundschaftsrecht der preußischen Monarchie nach der Vormundschaftsordnung vom 5. Juli 1875 (in German) (2 ed.). Berlin: Guttentag. OCLC 163082252. 3d ed., edited by Schultzenstein, 1886.
- "Das Preussische Hypothekenrecht" (with Hinrichs), Leipzig, 1877–91;
- "Pandekten," ib. 1884–87; 6th ed., 1900–01;
- "Die Königliche Friedrich-Wilhelms-Universität Berlin in Ihrem Personalbestande seit Ihrer Einrichtung bis 1885," ib. 1885;
- "Das Bürgerliche Recht des Deutschen Reiches und Preussen," Halle, 1898–1900.

== Bibliography ==
- Wesenberg, Gerhard (1957). "Dernburg, Heinrich". Neue Deutsche Biographie (in German). Vol. 3. Berlin: Duncker & Humblot. pp. 608–609. (full text online).
