= Shlomo Dichovsky =

Rabbi Shlomo Dichovsky
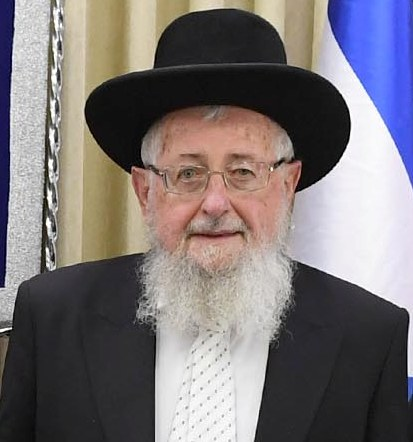

Religious life
- Religion: Judaism

Rabbi Shlomo Dichovsky (born December 15, 1938) is an Israeli rabbi and rabbinical judge. He was a member of the Great Rabbinical Court until his retirement, after which he served as Director of the Rabbinical Courts. He is considered a relatively lenient judge and halakhic decisor.

== Biography ==
He was born and raised in Tel Aviv, to Sarah and Rabbi Shemaya Dichovsky, a graduate of Lithuanian yeshivot who immigrated to the Land of Israel in the 1930s and served as a neighborhood rabbi in central Tel Aviv. He studied at the Yishuv HaHadash Yeshiva in the city, then continued at the Hebron Yeshiva in Jerusalem and at the “Shevet MiYehuda” kollel for married scholars in Tel Aviv, and received rabbinic ordination from Rabbis Isser Yehuda Unterman, Yechezkel Sarna, Chaim Shmuelevitz, and Betzalel Zolty.

In 1967 he began serving as a ram (senior lecturer) at Yeshivat Kerem B’Yavneh. In 1969 he was appointed rabbi of the Yeshurun Synagogue in northern Tel Aviv. He also served as a ram and educator at Yeshivat Sha’alvim, as an external lecturer in the law faculties at Bar-Ilan University and Tel Aviv University, and as head of the Higher Institute for Torah at Bar-Ilan University—a role in which he also assisted in its establishment.

In 1975 he was certified for dayanut by the Council of the Chief Rabbinate, and in January 1976 he was appointed as a rabbinical judge, first serving in Ashdod and later in Tel Aviv as av beit din. In 1988 he was appointed to the Great Rabbinical Court, from which he retired in Kislev 5769 (2008), and he also served as head of the examination system for rabbinical judges, as a member of the committee for appointing judges, and as head of the “Shevet MiYehuda” kollel in Tel Aviv for training rabbinical judges—an institution founded by Rabbi Isser Yehuda Unterman and regarded as one of the oldest of its kind.

During his tenure on the Great Rabbinical Court, he stood out for his original approach advocating the development of halakhic solutions to the problem of agunot and women denied a get, as well as for his nuanced view of the complex relationship between the Jewish legal system and the general (civil) legal system.

In response to Rabbi Avraham Sherman's claim that the conversions performed by Rabbi Druckman should be annulled, Rabbi Dichovsky published articles arguing that one rabbinical court has no authority to invalidate a conversion carried out by another court, that the decisive moment in conversion is the act of immersion, and that a convert's actions after the conversion are of no halakhic significance. On another occasion, he criticized the overly burdensome and technical approach of rabbinical courts to conversion, which test converts on complex areas of halakhah, arguing that this constitutes an absurdity bordering on pedantry for its own sake.

He ran for the position of Chief Rabbi of Israel as the Ashkenazi candidate—with the support of the Labor Party—but lost the race.

On August 13, 2010, he was selected by the Committee for the Appointment of Rabbinical Judges to serve as Director-General of the Rabbinical Courts, replacing Rabbi Eliyahu Ben Dahan. Rabbi Dichovsky clarified that the position was intended to be temporary and that he was not interested in a permanent appointment; in March 2011, however, the appointment became permanent for a four-year term. He served as rabbi of the Heichal Meir Synagogue in Tel Aviv until the year 5778 (2018). His articles were collected in 5774 (2014) and again in 5783 (2023) in the book Lev Shomea LeShlomo (published in three volumes), edited and published by his son, Rabbi Yaakov Dichovsky.

== Judicial Activity ==
During his tenure as a rabbinical judge, he became known for his efficiency in drafting rulings and for his integrity, earning broad public respect. Rabbi Dichovsky was also highly regarded among secular jurists, including then–President of the Supreme Court Aharon Barak, who in 1994 offered him a position as a justice on the Supreme Court. This offer was ultimately withdrawn after Rabbi Dichovsky consulted with Rabbi Yosef Shalom Elyashiv.

After his retirement, Aharon Barak proposed that he take part in a committee intended to mediate the points of friction between the family courts and the rabbinical courts and to resolve the problem of the “race for jurisdiction.”

Upon his retirement, Rabbi Dichovsky addressed his fellow rabbinical judges with a message that was unusual in the world of halakhic adjudication, asking them in his farewell letter: “Rule leniently, and do not provoke the High Court of Justice.”

== Family ==
Rabbi Dichovsky is married to Shoshana (née Hershtik), a cousin of the cantors of the Hershtik family. He is the father of five children. Two of his sons-in-law, Rabbi Avraham Mizels and Rabbi Yitzchak Marwah, serve as rabbinical judges. His son Yaakov is a jurist and a rabbinical court advocate. He resides in the Har Nof neighborhood of Jerusalem.

His son, Rabbi Moshe Natan, served as head of a kollel in the Ramat Shlomo neighborhood of Jerusalem and passed away after battling cancer in May, 2017.

His nephew is the composer and arranger Yuval Stoppel.
