= Peter E. Hildebrand =

Peter E. Hildebrand earned his PhD from Michigan State University in 1959 in Agricultural Economics. He joined the University of Florida faculty in 1979 and retired on July 1, 2003. During that time, he served as Director and Professor for IFAS International Programs, Agricultural Economics (1972-1999), and as a professor of Food and Resource Economics. Hildebrand's international background encompasses work in over 31 countries over 35 years.

At the University of Florida, Hildebrand developed innovative methodological approaches to training research and extension programs to reach food producers in the United States and abroad. He developed many of the basic ideas and approaches are the foundation for the Farming Systems Research and Extension methodology. He was the founding president of the global Association for Farming Systems Research and Extension. He coordinated the University of Florida Farming Systems Program, coordinated the University of Florida Women in Agricultural Development Program, and provided support for the University of Florida Gender, Environment, Agriculture and Participation Program. His research is in the area of farming systems research-extension methods, gender analysis, small-farm livelihood systems, and tropical conservation and development.

In retirement, Hildebrand has continued his research including working on the development of the International Farming Systems Collection, a digital collection within the University of Florida Digital Collections that collects teaching, research, and extension resources pertaining to the Farming Systems approach to international agricultural development.
