= Johann Hildebrand =

German composer, organist, and poet

Johann Hildebrand, also Hildebrandt (June 1614 in Pretzsch an der Elbe – 5 July 1684) was a German composer, organist, and poet.

He became organist of St Nikolai in Eilenburg in 1637, a post he held until his death. He worked as both a poet and composer, arguing that "noble music and poetry should be readily compatible," although he was not widely recognized as a poet.

He is remembered primarily for his peace motet: "Krieges-Angst-Seufftzer" bey itzigen grund-bösen kriegerischen Zeiten instendig zu gebrauchen (1645), based on Bible verses and original poetry by the composer. Apart from that and a funeral piece from 1648, other possible attributions may have been confused with the works of Johann Heinrich Hildebrand, the Kantor at Ohrdruf; and it remains uncertain who wrote them.
