= Jürgen Hildebrand =

German handball player (born 1948)

Medal record

Representing East Germany

Men's Handball

World Championships
Silver medal – second place	1974 GDR	Team

Jürgen Hildebrand (born 24 July 1948) is an East German former handball player who competed in the 1972 Summer Olympics.

He was born in Halle an der Saale. In 1972 he was part of the East German team which finished fourth in the Olympic tournament. He played all six matches and scored one goal. He played for the SC Dynamo Berlin / Sportvereinigung (SV) Dynamo. He won the silver medal at the world championships, 1974.
