= Azoulay =

Azoulay, sometimes spelled Azoulai, Azulai or Azulay (Hebrew: אזולאי), etc. is a Sephardic Jewish surname common among Jews of Moroccan descent.

It is assumed that the family name Azulai is a Hebrew abbreviation of the beginning of the biblical restriction on whom a priest may marry according to Leviticus 21:7, אזול״י and thus indicates priestly descent: Biblical Hebrew: אִשָּׁ֨ה זֹנָ֤ה וַחֲלָלָה֙ לֹ֣א יִקָּ֔חוּ, romanized: iššā zōnā waḥlālā lōʾ yiqqāḥu, lit. 'They shall not marry a woman defiled by prostitution'..

Despite this long-standing tradition, a member of the family Abraham Azoulay of Marrakesh (not to be confused with the Kabbalist, Abraham Azulai of Hebron) protested this association vehemently, going so far as to excommunicate those who propagated that acronym..

According to Mohamed Chafik, "Azoulay" (Arabic: أزولاي, Berber languages: ⴰⵣⵓⵍⴰⵢ) is a common Moroccan Jewish family name, and has the straightforward meaning "hairy, whose body is full of hair" in Berber languages.

== People ==
=== Azoulay family of Fez ===
Azoulay, is the name of a notable Jewish family descended from Spanish exiles who, after the expulsion of the Jews from Spain in 1492 and following decades, settled in the city of Fez, Morocco. The family includes:

- Abraham Azulai (c. 1570 – 1643), Kabbalistic author and commentator best known for his Chessed le-Avraham
- Chaim Yosef David Azulai (1724–1807), a rabbinical scholar and a noted bibliophile, who pioneered the history of Jewish religious writings
- Raphael Isaiah Azulai (died 1830), rabbi and writer

=== Others ===
- André Azoulay, Senior adviser to King Mohammed VI of Morocco
- Ariella Azoulay, Israeli scholar and documentarian, see Herzliya Biennial
- Aryeh Azulai, Israeli politician
- Audrey Azoulay, French Minister of Culture
- Blanche Azoulay, Algerian lawyer
- Daniel Azulay, Brazilian visual artist, comic book artist, and educator
- Hanna Azoulay Hasfari, Israeli actress and filmmaker
- Jean-Luc Azoulay, French filmmaker, see AB Disques
- Jom Tob Azulay, Brazilian film producer and director
- Shay K. Azoulay, Israeli writer
- Simon Azoulay Pedersen, Danish footballer
- Yinon Azulai, Israeli politician

== See also ==
- Azoulay v The Queen, 1952 Canadian Supreme Court case, wherein Dr. Leon Azoulay was accused of murder after the death of a patient receiving an abortion
- The Policeman, Hashoter Azoulay was the original title of the Israeli film The Policeman
