= Chok l'Yisrael =

Compendium of Jewish texts for study

Chok l'Yisrael (Hebrew: חֹק לישראל) is a compendium of Jewish texts designed for daily or weekly study.

== Structure ==
The work is usually published in book form in five volumes, corresponding to the five books of the Torah. It is divided into 54 sections representing the 54 weekly Torah readings, and each section is in turn divided according to the days of the week.

Each daily section from Sunday to Thursday morning contains:

- a set number of verses from the Torah reading for the week, together with its Targum and the commentary of Rashi;
- the same number of verses from Nevi'im (the prophetical books) and Ketuvim (the Hagiographa), also with Targum and commentary;
- one chapter from the Mishnah;
- a short extract from the Talmud, often but not always relating to the same massekhet as the Mishnah chapter;
- a passage from the Zohar for that week's Torah portion;
- extracts from books of Jewish law (halakha) and morality (musar).

The section for the night of Thursday to Friday contains another 26 verses from the Torah portion for the week but no other passages.

The section for Friday morning as printed consists of the remainder of the Torah portion for the week, though the reader is supposed to read the entire portion in accordance with the principle of Shnayim mikra ve-echad targum (each verse twice in Hebrew and once in Aramaic translation). After this the reader is instructed to recite the whole haftarah for the week: there is no passage from Ketuvim. There is then a chapter from the Mishnah and extracts from the Talmud, the Zohar and books of law and morality as on the other days.

The end of each volume contains readings to be used on Shabbat.

== Origin ==
The work is based on the rules of study laid down in the Peri Etz Chaim of Hayyim ben Joseph Vital, in the Sha'ar Hanhagat Limmud (chapter on study habits). In this he recommends that, in addition to studying the Torah portion for the forthcoming Shabbat each week, one should study daily excerpts from the other works mentioned, and lays down a formula for the number of verses or the topic to be studied each day depending on the day of the week.

The compendium was first issued in book form by Rabbi Yitzchak Baruch. Rabbi Chaim Joseph David Azulai added the extracts from books of law and morality and brought the collection to its present form.

== Use ==
The work is often used by busy working people who do not have time for in-depth Talmud study, particularly in Sephardic and Mizrahi Jews. The approved method is to read the section for the day immediately after morning prayers, while still wearing tallit and tefillin. Hayyim Vital, in his Sha'ar Ha-mitsvot, parashat Va-etchanan, states "And this was the custom of my teacher (meaning Isaac Luria): after coming out of synagogue and eating his breakfast, he would wrap himself in tsitsit and put on tefillin, and afterwards read the readings as set out below, with the preliminary meditations set out below."

== Editions and translations ==
- Hok L'Yisrael Edmond J. Safra Edition, Hebrew and English [Rabbi Yoseph Milstein + Various editors.] 10 volumes published by Machon Yisrael Trust, available online at eChok.com.
- The older Berkowitz softcover edition is available on amazon.com

== See also ==
- Torah study
- Seder ha-Mishmarah
- Shnayim mikra ve-echad targum
- Daily Rambam Study
- Chitas
- Daf Yomi
- Other study cycles under Torah study #Study cycles
