= Shnayim mikra ve-echad targum =

Jewish religious practice

Shnayim mikra ve-echad targum (Hebrew: שנים מקרא ואחד תרגום, lit. 'Twice Scripture and once translation'), is the Jewish practice of reading the weekly Torah portion in a prescribed manner. In addition to hearing the Torah portion read in the synagogue, a person should read it himself twice during that week, together with a translation usually by Targum Onkelos and/or Rashi's commentary. In addition, while not required by law, there exists an Ashkenazi custom to also read the portion from the Prophets with its targum.

== Sources ==
According to the gemara:

"...אמר רב הונא בר יהודה אמר רבי אמי "לעולם ישלים אדם פרשיותיו עם הצבור שנים מקרא ואחד תרגום
Rav Huna bar Yehuda says in the name of Rabbi Ammi: "one should always complete the reading of one's weekly Torah portion with the congregation, twice from the mikra (i.e. Torah) and once from the Targum."

This statement was interpreted as the ritual of Shnayim mikra ve-echad targum and is codified in the Shulchan Aruch:

"Even though each person hears the Torah reading each week in the public reading, we are obligated to read each parasha twice in the Hebrew and once in the Aramaic targum... Rashi's commentary shares the status of Targum, and those who fear Heaven will read the parashah with both Rashi's commentary and the targum."

== Laws ==
Times of Recitation (starting with most ideal)
1. On Friday, after midday
2. On Friday, after the morning prayer
3. On the Sabbath morning, before the lunch meal
4. After the Sabbath lunch meal but before the time for the Mincha prayer
5. Up until Tuesday evening following the Sabbath of a particular weekly portion
6. Up until Shemini Atzeret of that particular year

As above, the basic obligation of Shnayim mikra ve-echad targum involves reciting the Hebrew text of the weekly portion twice and then reciting Targum Onkelos once.

- One should read a passage from the Torah twice, followed by the Targum translation of that passage, then continuing to the next Torah passage in order. However, if one read the verses out of order, or read the translation of a passage between the two readings of the passage itself, one's obligation is fulfilled and one does not need to repeat the reading.
- There are multiple customs for how the Torah text is divided for the purposes of shnaim mikra (which affects the sequence in which the text and translation are read). Some divide the text into individual verses, reading a single verse twice followed by its translation, then continuing to the next verse. Others divide the Torah into its closed and open paragraphs as set out in a Torah scroll and in most printed copies, reading each paragraph as a whole, first twice in Hebrew and then once in Targum. Others divide by aliyot, reading one or two a day (see below) or according to other divisions.
- While listening to the Torah in synagogue, one can read the text along with the reader and count it towards one recitation of mikra.
- By “Targum,” the Talmud refers to the Targum Onkelos. Numerous authorities say that the commentary of Rashi is also acceptable. Some maintain that it would be appropriate for one to study both Rashi and the Targum. If one does not have time for both, however, most poskim agree that Targum takes precedence over Rashi. The Mishnah Berurah concludes that if one cannot understand the commentary of Rashi, he may use a translation that conforms with traditional interpretations of the text; as an example, the book Tseno Ureno in Yiddish is suggested.
- Multiple customs exist for when shnayim mikra should preferably be read. Some do the entire reading nonstop on Friday morning. Others read one aliyah of shnayim mikra on each day of the week. One should preferably finish the reading by the Shabbat morning Torah reading.
- The Hebrew text should be recited with cantillation and with proper pronunciation. The Targum, however, should not be recited with cantillation.
- According to some, after completing shnaim mikra, the last verse should be read in Hebrew again so as not to complete the portion in the Targum translation. According to Chaim Yosef David Azulai, the last verse should be read twice.
- When a holiday falls on a Friday, the weekly portion should be read on the Sabbath before the lunch meal. Some hold that Shnayim mikra ve-echad targum may be read on Yom Tov itself.
- On the day of Hoshana Rabbah (any part of the daytime), Shnayim mikra ve-echad targum should be read for the V'Zot HaBerachah portion.
- Moses Isserles, on 285:7, states that similarly reciting the Haftarah is customary although not obligatory (see Minhag). Other sources, e.g. Kitzur Shulchan Aruch ad. loc., likewise mention this custom. When (and if) the Haftarah for a bridegroom is read, one nevertheless reads the regular Haftarah here.

== Specialized books ==
Although one may read Shnayim mikra ve-echad targum from any text, special books have been published which print the Hebrew text twice consecutively followed by the Aramaic Targum so as to assure that the reader will recite the requisite repetitions of each verse. Examples include Chumash Haavarat HaSidra and Chumash Shnayim Mikra Ve'Echad Targum. Electronic versions for use in smartphones, tablet computers and e-book readers are also available.

Other works designed for daily Torah study (such as Chok l'Yisrael, which includes the Torah with other study texts divided by the weeks of the year) will print the Hebrew text once, and, as with a standard Chumash, the reader must remember to repeat the Hebrew text before going on to the Targum. Some of these works divide the weekly portion by day and, generally correspondingly, by Aliyah (Sunday: first Aliyah, Monday: Second Aliyah...). Others divide the weekly portion differently: for example Chok L'Yisrael prescribes a set number of verses for each day of the week, with the remainder of the portion to be read on Friday.

== See also ==
For other study cycles, see Torah study § Study cycles
