= Torah study =

Studying the Torah, Talmud or other rabbinic literature

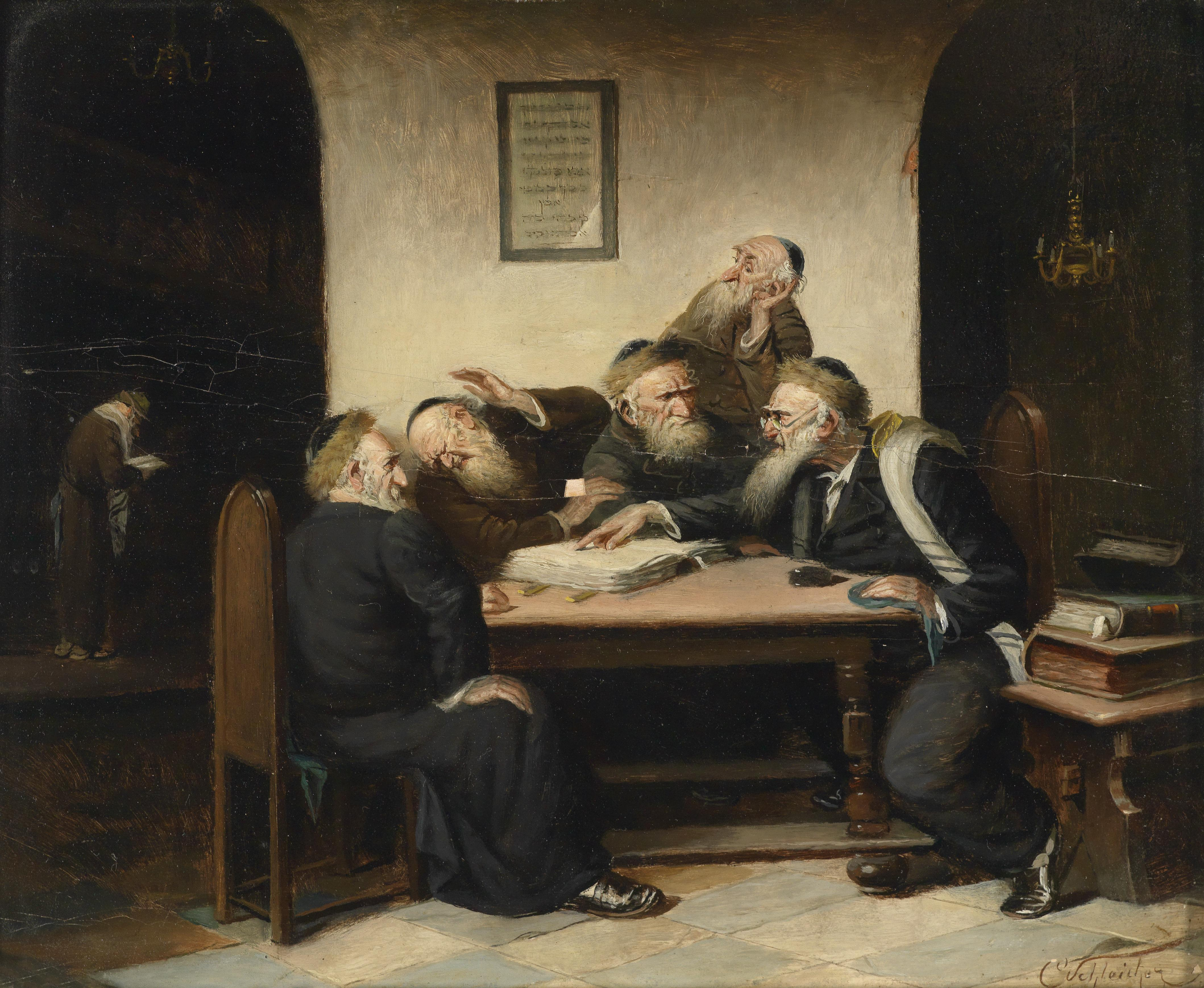
Rabbis debating the Talmud, 1870

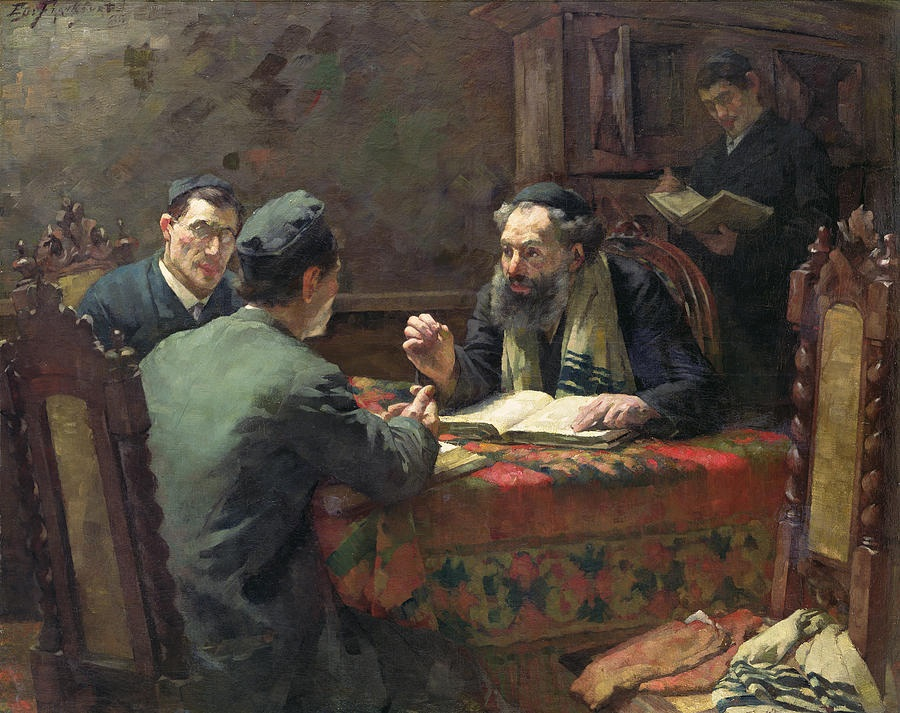
A historic painting of Jews studying Torah

Torah study is the study of the Torah, Hebrew Bible, Talmud, responsa, rabbinic literature, and similar works, all of which are Judaism's religious texts. According to Rabbinic Judaism, the study is done for the purpose of the mitzvah ("commandment") of Torah study itself.

This practice is present to an extent in all religious branches of Judaism, and is considered of paramount importance among religious Jews. Torah study has evolved over the generations, as lifestyles changed and also as new texts were written.

== Traditional view ==
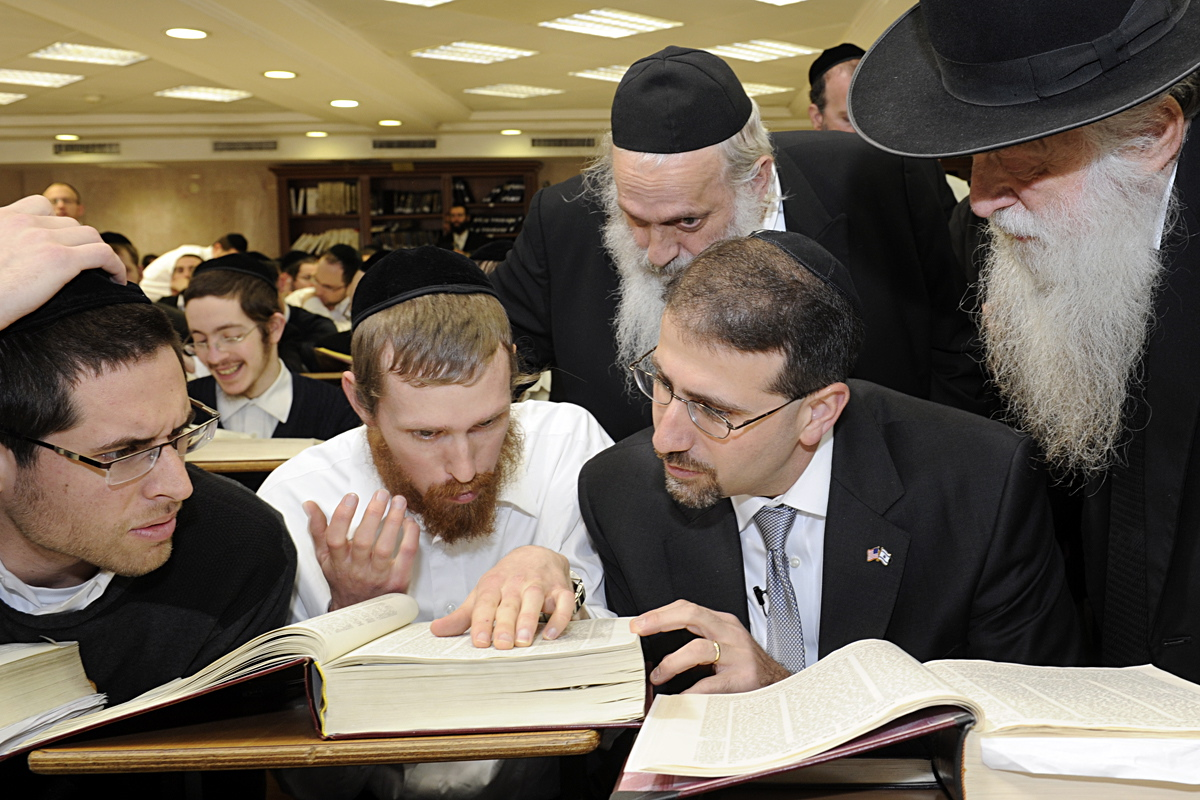
Students in the Mir Yeshiva, Jerusalem, studying Talmud as a chavrusa

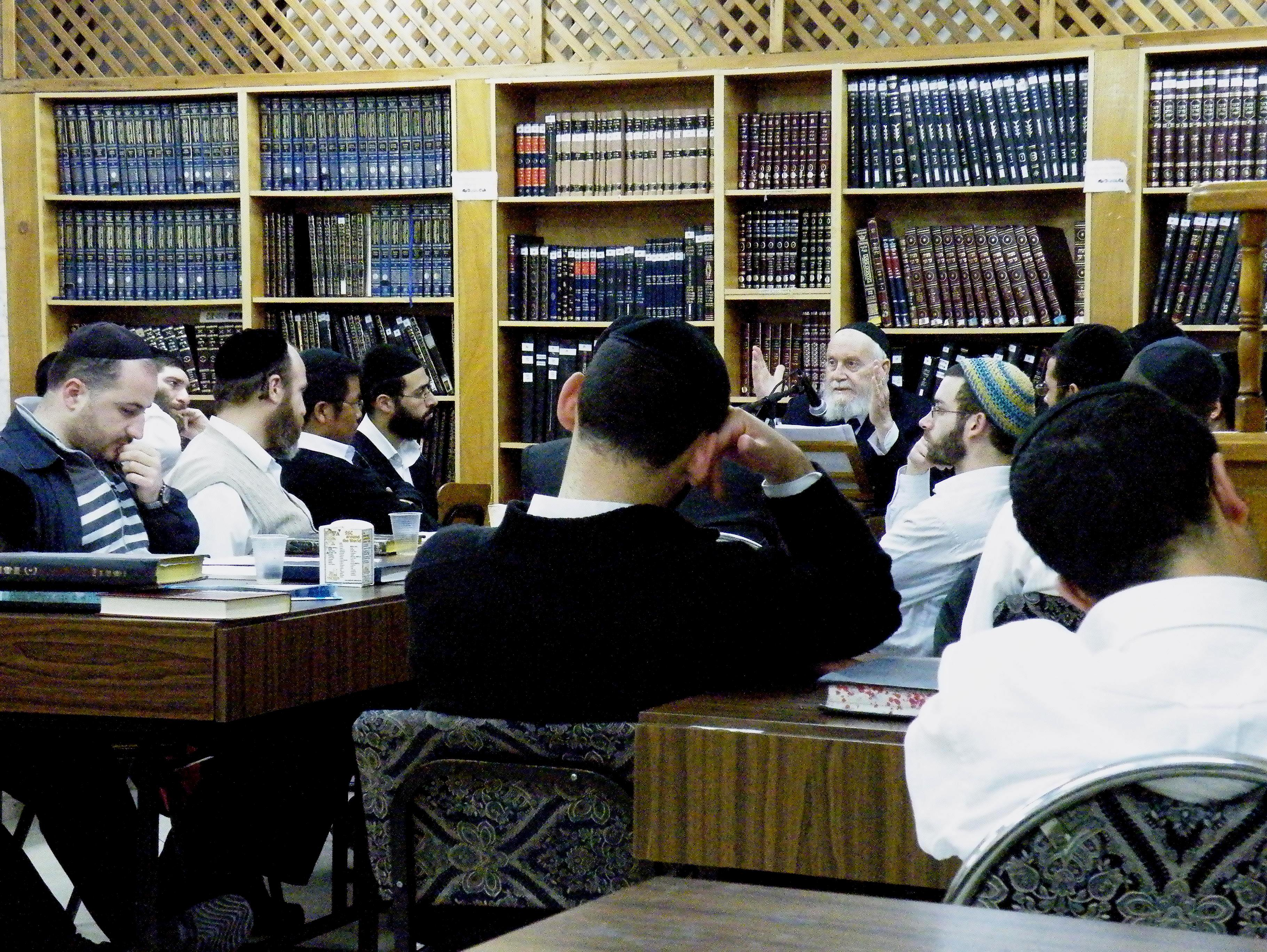
A Torah class in Jerusalem

In rabbinic literature, a heavy emphasis is placed on Torah study for Jewish males, with women being exempt. This literature teaches an eagerness for such study and a thirst for knowledge that expands beyond the text of the Tanakh to the entire Oral Torah. Some examples of traditional religious teachings:

- The study of Torah is "equal to all" of the mitzvot of honouring one's parents, performing deeds of lovingkindness, and bringing peace between people.
- In one sense, Torah study is greater than the honor of father and mother since it is one of the only commandments for which a person is allowed to move far away from his parents without their permission.
- Some Talmudic rabbis consider Torah study as being greater than the rescue of human life, but Jewish law does not codify this opinion because saving a life overrides all other commandments except murder, incest, and idolatry.
- According to Rabbi Meir, when one studies Torah Lishma (Torah for its own sake - תורה לשמה) the creation of the entire world is worthwhile for him alone, and he brings joy to God.
- As the child must satisfy its hunger day by day, so must the grown man busy himself with the Torah each hour.
- Torah study is of more value than the offering of the daily sacrifice.
- A single day devoted to the Torah outweighs 1,000 korbanot (sacrifices).
- The fable of the Fish and the Fox, in which the latter seeks to entice the former to dry land, declares that [the People of] Israel can live only in the Law as fish can live only in the ocean.
- Whoever learns Torah at night is granted grace during the day, and whoever neglects it will be fed burning coals in the World to Come.
- God weeps over one who might have occupied himself with Torah study but neglected to do so.
- The study must be unselfish: one should study the Torah with self-denial, even at the sacrifice of one's life; and in the very hour before death one should devote himself to this duty.
- All, even lepers and the ritually unclean, are required to study the Torah.
- It is the duty of everyone to read the entire weekly portion twice (the law of shnayim mikra ve-echad targum).
- According to R. Yehudah, God Himself studies the Torah for the first three hours of every day.
- According to Rabbi Meir, a gentile who studies the Torah (for the limited purpose of finding out about the Seven Laws of Noah) is as great as the High Priest. An even stronger statement is found in the Mishnah where it discusses the social hierarchy of ancient Israel. The High Priest was close to the top of the social pyramid, and a man born from an illicit sexual relationship was near the bottom. However, 'the learned bastard takes precedence over the ignorant High Priest.'
- Rabbi Tzvi Hirsch Chajes contended that the prohibition of teaching torah to Gentiles only applies to parts of the Oral Law, but not to the written Scriptures.
- Rabbi Samuel Eidels said the prohibition only included the "reasons and secrets" of the Torah, but not the basic texts or laws.
- Maimonides said that Christians, who believe in the divinity of Scriptures, would at best come to believe in the Jewish interpretation and at worse cause no harm, so the prohibition does not apply to them.
- Rabbi Yisrael Salanter advocated for the translation of the Talmud and its introduction into the university curriculum, in order to raise the reputation of Jewish study in the broader world.

== Origins ==
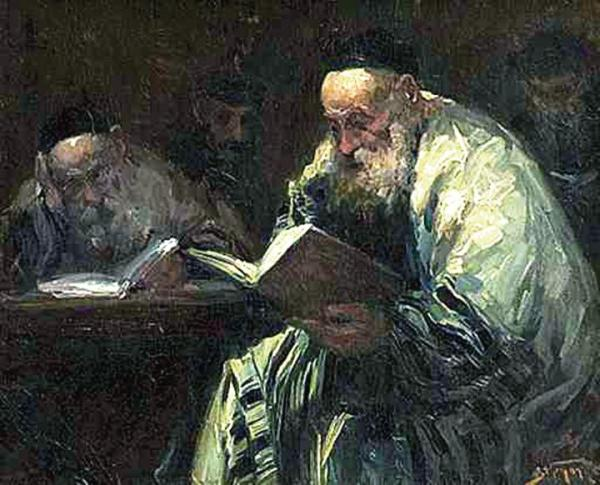
Rabbis engaged in Talmud study, early 20th century

Torah study is counted among the 613 mitzvot (commandments), upon which the Talmud comments that "Study is necessary in order to teach."

From the Book of Deuteronomy:

And thou shalt teach them diligently unto thy children, and shalt talk of them when thou sittest in thine house, and when thou walkest by the way, and when thou liest down, and when thou risest up. (KJV)

— Deuteronomy 6:7

Similarly, as written in the Book of Joshua:

"לֹא יָמוּשׁ סֵפֶר הַתּוֹרָה הַזֶּה מִפִּיךָ, וְהָגִיתָ בּוֹ יוֹמָם וָלַיְלָה, לְמַעַן תִּשְׁמֹר לַעֲשׂוֹת כְּכָל הַכָּתוּב בּוֹ, כִּי אָז תַּצְלִיחַ אֶת דְּרָכֶךָ וְאָז תַּשְׂכִּיל"

This book of the law shall not depart out of thy mouth; but thou shalt meditate therein day and night, that thou mayest observe to do according to all that is written therein: for then thou shalt make thy way prosperous, and then thou shalt have good success. (KJV)

— Joshua 1:8

Quotes from rabbis:

...the practical commandments are but a prelude to the intelligibles, and since the intellect is not constituted by them, there is no advantage in performing them

— Or Adonai

...the essence is to perform a Mitzvah at its correct time and with all of its detail and precision as an immutable decree and that purity of good thought should be attached to the performance then 'you will then go securely and both will be fulfilled in your hands. As the explicit Mishna taught that all for whom their actions are greater than their wisdom, then even their wisdom will be preserved in holiness, purity, and inspirational fervor and the comparison that Chazal make about this cannot be trivialized, that all whose actions are greater than their wisdom are like a tree whose leaves are few and their roots are many, that all the winds in the world cannot move it from its place and 'the one who hears will internalize'

— Nefesh haTzimtzum, Chaim of Volozhin

The importance of study is attested to in another Talmudic discussion regarding which is preferred: study or action? The answer there, a seeming compromise, is "study that leads to action." Although the word "Torah" refers specifically to the Five Books of Moses, in Judaism the word also refers to the Tanakh (Hebrew Bible), the Talmud and other religious works, even including the study of Kabbalah, Hasidism, Mussar and much more.

=== Kabbalah of action ===
R. Menachem son of Yossi expounded the verse: For a Commandment is a "candle", but the Torah is "light"... for this is your life and Torah study is equated with all the Mitzvot

The Mitzvot is like a body because of their performances and these are done by "action" as the material elements with holy Kavanah to bring supernal life to all the world... (i.e. to give good and "Rachamim/Clement attributes" by Tikkun) But Torah study is always protection by God and this is a cause of the Brit of Matan Torah, as written : ≪Torah is in your heart... this is in your "words"!≫

As per Chazal: Until the Torah was given to Israel, it says that "and Moshe ascended to God," but after the Torah was given, God says: "and they shall make Me a Sanctuary and I will dwell in them." These words will suffice for a thinking person. And through them he will see and understand his path in holiness, 'and righteousness will grasp its way' to preserve his study of the Holy Torah all the days of his life 'to despise bad and choose good' for himself and for all the creations and all the worlds to provide pleasure for his Maker and Creator. May it be God's Will 'that He open up our hearts with His Torah and that He should place Love and Fear of Him in our hearts' and thereby complete His intention in creating His Universe 'that the Universe will be rectified with His Sovereignty'

— Chaim of Volozhin

The Torah is the Tree of Life to find true spiritual life, that is the Holy Spirit with the three Supernal Sefirot with Da'at and the others. The study of Torah can give life and this can build a Temple in the inner dimension of person: God will not take the holy sacrifices but words of Torah and of prayers because in Messianic era the sins will be not and the little sins will be atoned through true force of soul in the heart (Neshama and Ruach with Nephesh) and words of truth on pure and holy mouth.

== Forms of traditional Jewish Torah study ==
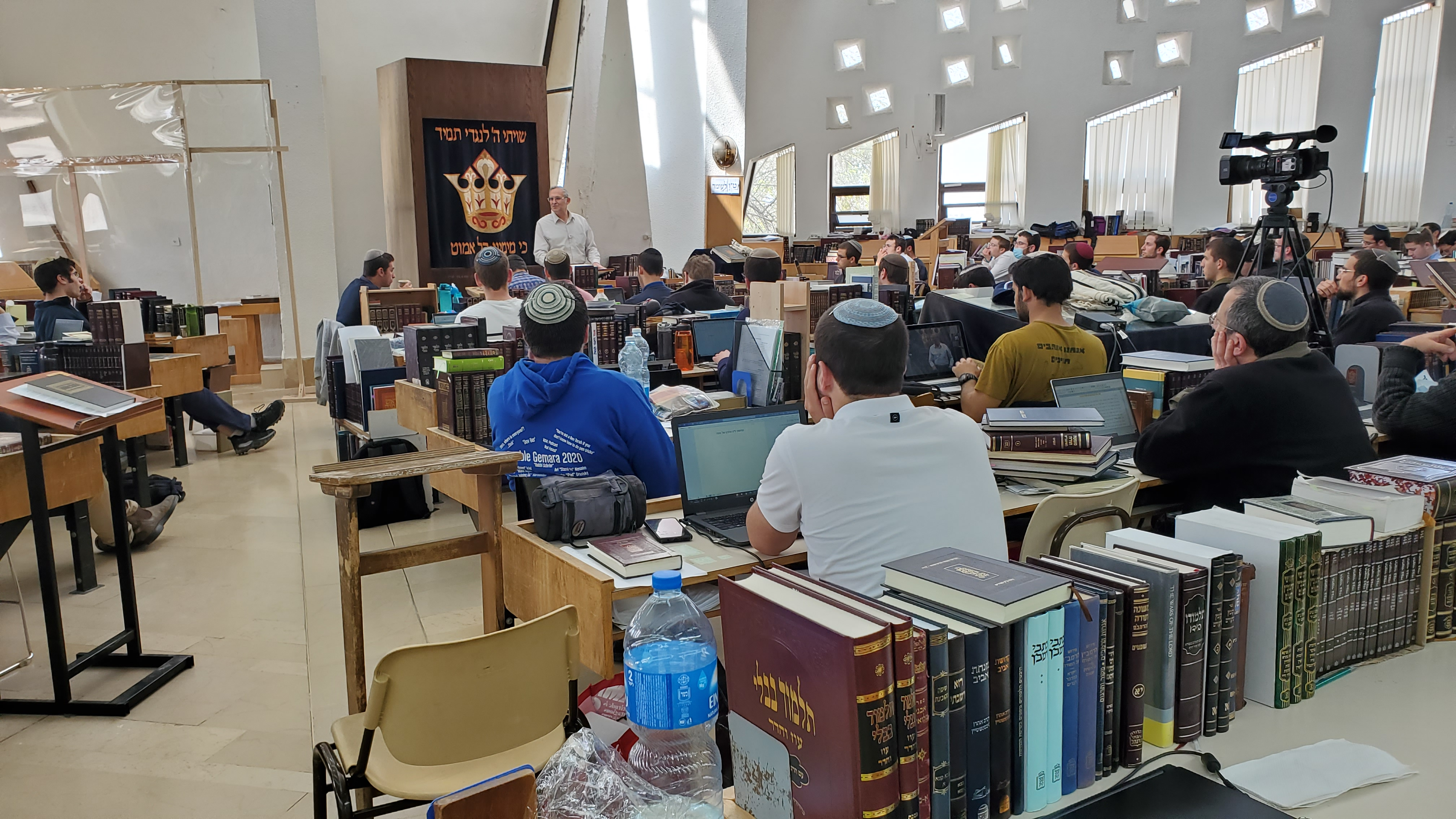
A Shiur being given by the Rosh Yeshiva at Yeshivat Har Etzion

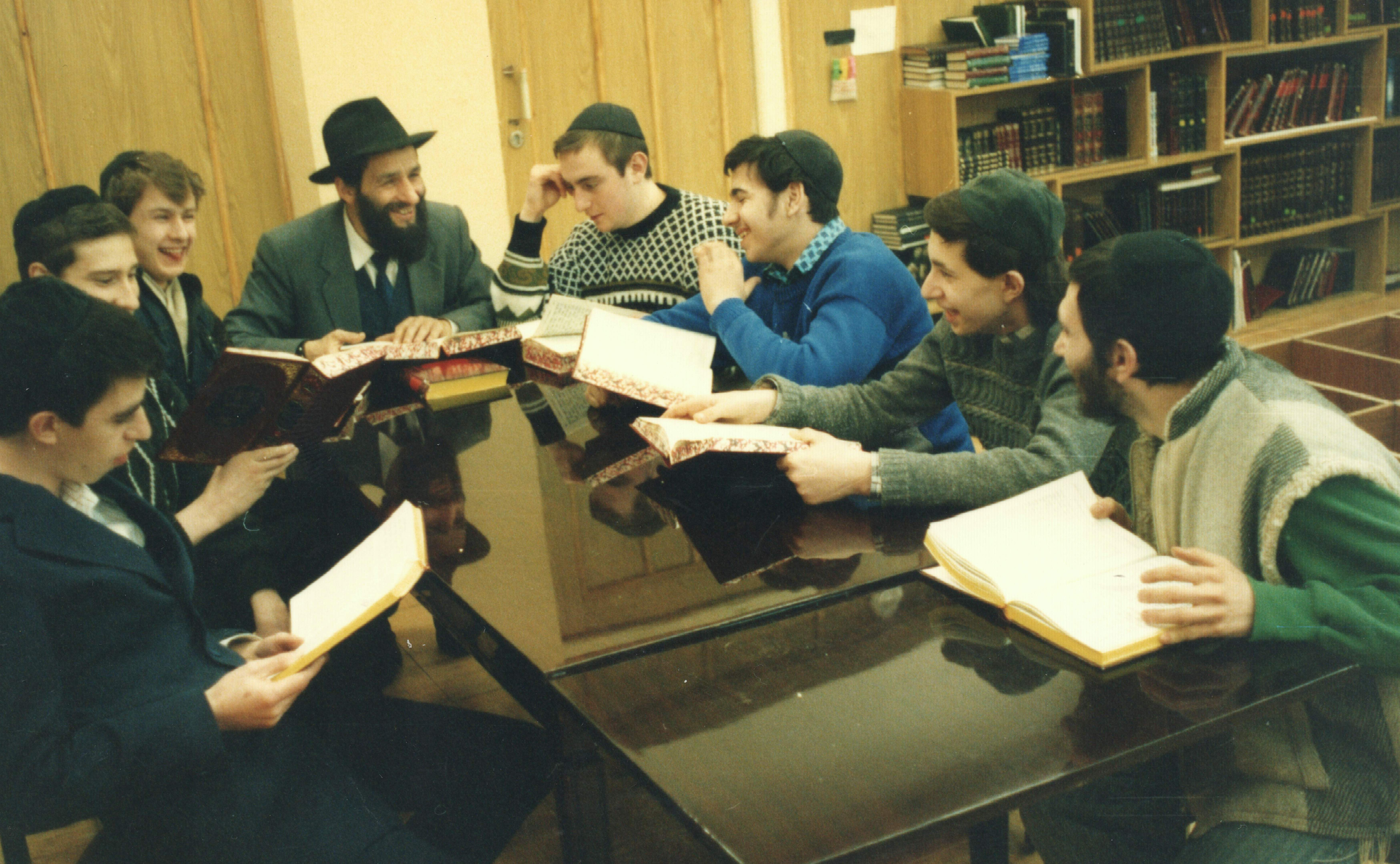
Rabbi and his students in Moscow, Russia

The Talmud defines the objective of Torah study: "That the words of Torah shall be clear in your mouth so that if someone asks you something, you shall need not hesitate and then tell it to him, rather you shall tell it to him immediately." In yeshivas (Talmudical schools), rabbinical schools and kollels (post-graduate Talmudical schools) the primary ways of studying Torah include study of:

- The Parsha (weekly Torah portion) with its Meforshim (Rabbinic commentators)
- Talmud
- Ethical works

Other less universally studied texts include the Nevi'im and Ketuvim, other rabbinic literature (such as midrash) and works of religious Jewish philosophy.

The text of the Torah can be studied on any of four levels as described in the Zohar:

- Peshat, the plain (simple) or literal reading;
- Remez, the allegorical reading through text's hint or allusion
- Derash, the metaphorical reading through a (rabbinic sermon's) comparison/illustration (midrash)
- Sod, the hidden meaning reading through text's secret or mystery (Kabbalah).

The initial letters of the words Peshat, Remez, Derash, Sod, forming together the Hebrew word PaRDeS (also meaning "orchard"), became the designation for the four-way method of studying Torah, in which the mystical sense given in the Kabbalah was the highest point. The distinction is similar to the medieval Christian classification into literal, typological, tropological (moral) and anagogical senses of scripture (see Allegory in the Middle Ages): it is not certain whether this fourfold division first appeared in a Jewish or a Christian context.

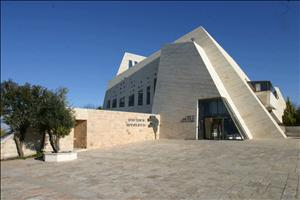
Yeshivat Har Etzion in Alon Shevut

In Haredi Judaism and much of Orthodox Judaism, Torah study is a way of life for males. In these communities, men forgo other occupations and study Torah full-time. Women do not study Torah, but instead gain merit for facilitating the Torah study of the men. A 2017 survey of Modern Orthodox Jews found support for women studying Torah.

Haredi Israelis often choose to devote many years to Torah study, often studying at a kollel. Religious Zionist Israelis often choose to devote time after high school to Torah study, either during their army service at a Hesder yeshiva, or before their service at a Mechina. Many Modern Orthodox students who study in Israel post high-school choose to study at Hesder Yeshivot, namely Yeshivat Har Etzion, Yeshivat Kerem B'Yavneh, Yeshivat Shaalvim and Yeshivat HaKotel. A portion of these students join the Hesder system, draft into the army and/or make Aliyah.

In addition to full-time Torah study, Jews around the world often attend Torah classes in a contemporary academic framework. The Rohr Jewish Learning Institute offers classes on Parenting, Marriage, Medical Ethics, and Business Ethics.

== Methods ==
=== The Brisker method ===
The Brisker method consists of a methodical search for precise definitions of each concept involved in the discussion. Once the mechanism by which a law works is rigidly and correctly defined, it can become clear that one aspect of the definition applies in one situation but not another. Therefore, the final halacha will differ in the two situations, even if they superficially appear to be very similar.

Often an entire series of disagreements among the Rishonim (Talmudic commentaries from roughly the period 1000–1500) may stem back to a subtle difference in how these Rishonim understand a line from the Talmud. The Brisker method can provide a precise formulation of how each Rishon understood the topic, and thus account for their differences in opinion. This approach is most productive when a whole series of debates between two Rishonim can be shown to revolve around a single chakira, or difference in the understanding of a Talmudic concept.

The Brisker method is not a total break from the past. Rabbis before Brisk sometimes made "conceptual" distinctions, and Brisker rabbis can still resolve issues without recourse to the terminology they invented. The difference is one of focus and degree. Non-Brisk analysis tends to formulate "conceptual" definitions only when necessary, while for Briskers, these definitions are the first and most common tool to be used when approaching a Talmudic issue.

One example of the emphasis on the value of precise definition can be found in a quote attributed to Chaim Soloveitchik: "One approach which answers three different problems is better than three different approaches to individually solve the three problems" (a corollary of Occam's razor).

=== The Luzzatto method ===
Moshe Chaim Luzzatto was the only one to set down the sages' thought process in an organized, systematic, and complete program that can be taught and reproduced. This method makes Gemara (Talmud) learning accessible to everyone by exploring key logical concepts of Talmudic analysis. It is claimed that based on precision and clarity of thinking, one's inherent intellectual powers are studied, cultivated and nurtured. Conscious awareness of one's thinking and thoughts is the key to understanding Torah.

=== The Zilberman method ===
The Zilberman Method, pioneered in the mid-20th century by Yitzhak Shlomo Zilberman, draws upon traditional teaching methods as outlined by Chazal and championed by the Judah Loew ben Bezalel and Vilna Gaon. The Mishnah and the Talmud set forth halakhic guidelines for teaching Torah to children. These guidelines include the ages at which texts should be studied ("Five years old is the age to begin studying Scripture; ten for Mishnah; thirteen for the obligation of the commandments; fifteen for the study of Talmud...") the times of study (including Shabbat for children; Hachazan roeh heichan tinokot korin – the chazzan observes [on Shabbat] where [in the text] the children are reading) and the manner of teaching (safi lei k'tura –stuffing the children like oxen; ligmar inish v'hadar lisbor –read the text and then explain it.)

The Zilberman method has children focus exclusively on Tanakh and Mishnah in their younger years, ensuring that they know large portions of both areas by heart before they begin learning Gemara. Indeed, graduates of such schools tend to have impressive fluency in these areas. Two key elements in Zilberman's methodology, however, must be singled out: chazarah (review) and student participation.

In the Zilberman-styled school, a new text of Chumash is introduced in the following manner (obviously adjustments are made for each grade level). On Monday and Tuesday, the teacher chants the text with the tropp (ta'amei ha'mikra) and the students immediately imitate him. This is repeated several times until the students are able to read the text independently. Then the teacher introduces the translation/explanation of the text and invites students to participate in the process. New words typically need to be translated only once; subsequently, students are encouraged to call out the translation on their own. All translations are strictly literal. If the translation does not automatically yield a comprehensible meaning, the students are invited to try to find one. The class spends the rest of the week reviewing the material. Each pasuk is reviewed with the tropp at least twenty-four times.

== Study cycles ==
Apart from full-time Torah study as engaged in at schools and yeshivot, or for the purpose of rabbinic training, there is also held to be an obligation on individuals to set aside a regular study period to review their knowledge. Pious individuals thus often daily review one of the major works - Talmud Bavli, Talmud Yerushalmi, Nach (Tanach), Midrash Rabba, Midrash Tanchuma, Tosefta, Sifra, Sifri, Mishna, Rambam, Tur, Shulchan Aruch, Mishnah Berurah, the Zohar - according to their interest. In more recent times, structured study-programmes have become popular; these include.

- Shnayim mikra ve-echad targum, study of the weekly Torah portion together with the Aramaic Targum - dating to Talmudic times - and often, Rashi's commentary.
- Ḥoq le-Yisrael, a programme founded by rabbis Hayyim ben Joseph Vital and Chaim Joseph David Azulai in which, every week, one studies extracts from the Mishnah, the Zohar and other works in addition to the portion for that week: the relevant passages are often printed in book form in a multivolume set.
- Daily Chumash with Rashi each day of the week corresponding to one of the seven Aliyos read on Shabbos - one part of Chabad's Chitas study
- The Seder ha-Mishmarah, used by some Mizrahi Jews, in which each weekly Torah portion is studied together with sections from Neviim and Ketuvim and the Mishnah so that all these works are read in full in the course of the year: this too has been published in book form under the title Ḥoq le-Ya'akob. In some countries it was customary for groups to gather in the synagogue each Shabbat afternoon and read out the mishmarah passages for the following Shabbat.
- The Daf Yomi program, founded in 1923 by Meir Shapiro: one page of the Talmud is studied each day, on a rota to ensure that Jews round the world are studying the same passage at the same time (approximately 7.5 year cycle).
- The Amud Yomi, similar to Daf Yomi, but only one side of a page per day (approximately 14 years)
- Yerushalmi Yomi – daily study of the Jerusalem Talmud (according to the pagination of the Vilna edition, this is a 4⅓-year cycle; starting with the most recent cycle, there is an alternate cycle following the Oz Vehadar edition, which is roughly a 7.5 year cycle.)
- Mishnah Yomit, daily study of the Mishnah (6 year cycle); Mishnatit covers all of Mishnah at a much faster pace (1 year cycle).
- Daily Rambam Study, one or three chapters of the Mishneh Torah (respectively, a 1 or 3-year cycle)
- Mishnah Berurah Yomit - daily study (2.5 or 5-year cycle)
- Kitzur Shulchan Aruch Yomi - daily study (1 year cycle)
- Halacha Yomit daily study of the Shulchan Aruch (4 year cycle); Breslov hasidim have a similar practice to daily review the Shulchan Aruch in addition to Likutei Moharan and Likutei Halachos
- Tanya - daily study (1 year cycle) as part of the Chitas cycle as for Rashi above
- 929: Tanakh B'yachad - study of 5 chapters of Tanakh (Jewish Bible) per week (approx 4 year cycle)
- Chafetz Chayim and Shemiras Halashon, daily review of the laws concerning Lashon Hara (meaning "Evil tongue", gossip and slander; 1 year cycle).
- Tzurba M'Rabanan (4 year cycle), detailed discussion on contemporary Halachik applications: studied in the Religious Zionist community (and outside Israel, through Mizrachi in some Modern Orthodox communities)

== D'var Torah ==
A d'var Torah (Hebrew: דבר תורה, "word of Torah"; plural: divrei Torah), also known as a drasha or drash in Ashkenazic communities, is a talk on topics generally relating to a parashah (section) of the Torah – typically the weekly Torah portion. A typical d'var Torah imparts a life lesson, backed up by passages from texts such as the Talmud, Midrash, or more recent works.

In respect to its place in synagogues, rabbis will often give their d'var Torah after the Torah reading. Divrei Torah can range in length, depending on the rabbi and the depth of the talk. In most congregations, it will not last much longer than fifteen minutes, but in the case of rebbes or special occasions, a d'var Torah can last all afternoon.

In other settings, "D'var Torah" is used interchangeably with "vort" (Yiddish for "word (of Torah)"), and may then refer to any Torah idea delivered informally, although typically linked to the weekly Parasha. This will be on various occasions, and not necessarily by a Rabbi: for example, by the host at their Shabbat table, by the leader before "Benching" (grace after meals), or by a guest at sheva brachot, or at any Seudat mitzvah.

== Torah study by various Jewish movements ==
The recommended way to study the Torah is by reading the original text written in Hebrew. This allows the reader to understand language-specific information. For example, the Hebrew word for earth is 'adama' and the name of the first man is 'Adam' meaning 'of the earth'. Jewish denominations vary in the importance placed on the usage of the original Hebrew text. Most denominations strongly recommend it, but also allow studying the Torah in other languages, and using Rashi and other commentary to learn language-specific information.

Like Orthodox Jews, other Jewish denominations may use any or all of the traditional areas and modes of Torah study. They study the Parsha, the Talmud, ethical works, and more. They may study simply the peshat of the text, or they may also study, to a limited extent, the remez, derash, and sod, which is found in Etz Hayyim: A Torah Commentary (Rabbinical Assembly), used in many Conservative congregations. It is common in Torah study among Jews involved in Jewish Renewal. Some level of PaRDeS study can even be found in forms of Judaism that otherwise are strictly rationalist, such as Reconstructionist Judaism. However, non-Orthodox Jews generally spend less time in detailed study of the classical Torah commentators, and spend more time studying modern Torah commentaries that draw on and include the classical commentators, but which are written from more modern perspectives. Furthermore, works of rabbinic literature (such as the Talmud) typically receive less attention than the Tanakh.

Before the Enlightenment, virtually all Jews believed that the Torah was dictated to Moses by God. Since many parts of the Torah, specifically the laws and commandments, are written in unspecific terms, they also believed that Moses received an interpretation of the Torah that was transmitted through the generations in oral form till it was finally put in writing in the Mishnah and later, in greater detail, the Talmud. After the Enlightenment, many Jews began to participate in wider European society, where they engaged in study related to critical methods of textual analysis, including both lower and higher criticism, the modern historical method, hermeneutics, and fields relevant to Bible study such as Near Eastern archaeology and linguistics. In time the documentary hypothesis emerged from these studies. The documentary hypothesis holds that the Torah was not written by Moses, but was simply written by different people who lived during different periods of Israelite history. Some Jews adapted the findings of these disciplines. Consequently, biblical study primarily focused on the intentions of these people, and the circumstances in which they lived. This type of study depends on evidence external to the text, especially archaeological evidence and comparative literature.

Today, Reform, Conservative, and Reconstructionist rabbis draw on the lessons of modern critical Bible scholarship as well as the traditional forms of Biblical exegesis. Orthodox Jews reject critical Bible scholarship and the documentary hypothesis, holding to the opinion that it is contradicted by the Torah and the Talmud, which state that Moses wrote the Torah, as well as by the Mishnah, which asserts the divine origin of the Torah as one of the essential Jewish principles of faith.

Humanistic Jews value the Torah as a historical, political, and sociological text written by their ancestors. They do not believe 'that every word of the Torah is true, or even morally correct, just because the Torah is old.' The Torah is both disagreed with and questioned. Humanistic Jews believe that the entire Jewish experience, and not only the Torah, should be studied as a source for Jewish behavior and ethical values.

=== Non-religious Torah study ===
According to Ruth Calderon, there are currently almost one hundred non-halakhic Torah study centers in Israel. While influenced by methods used in the yeshiva and in the university, non–religious Torah study includes the use of new tools that are not part of the accepted hermeneutic tradition of the exegetic literature. These include feminist and post-modernist criticism, historic, sociological and psychological analyses, and literary analysis. Among these institutions is the Alma Centre for Hebrew Studies in Tel Aviv.

== Torah study abroad in Israel ==
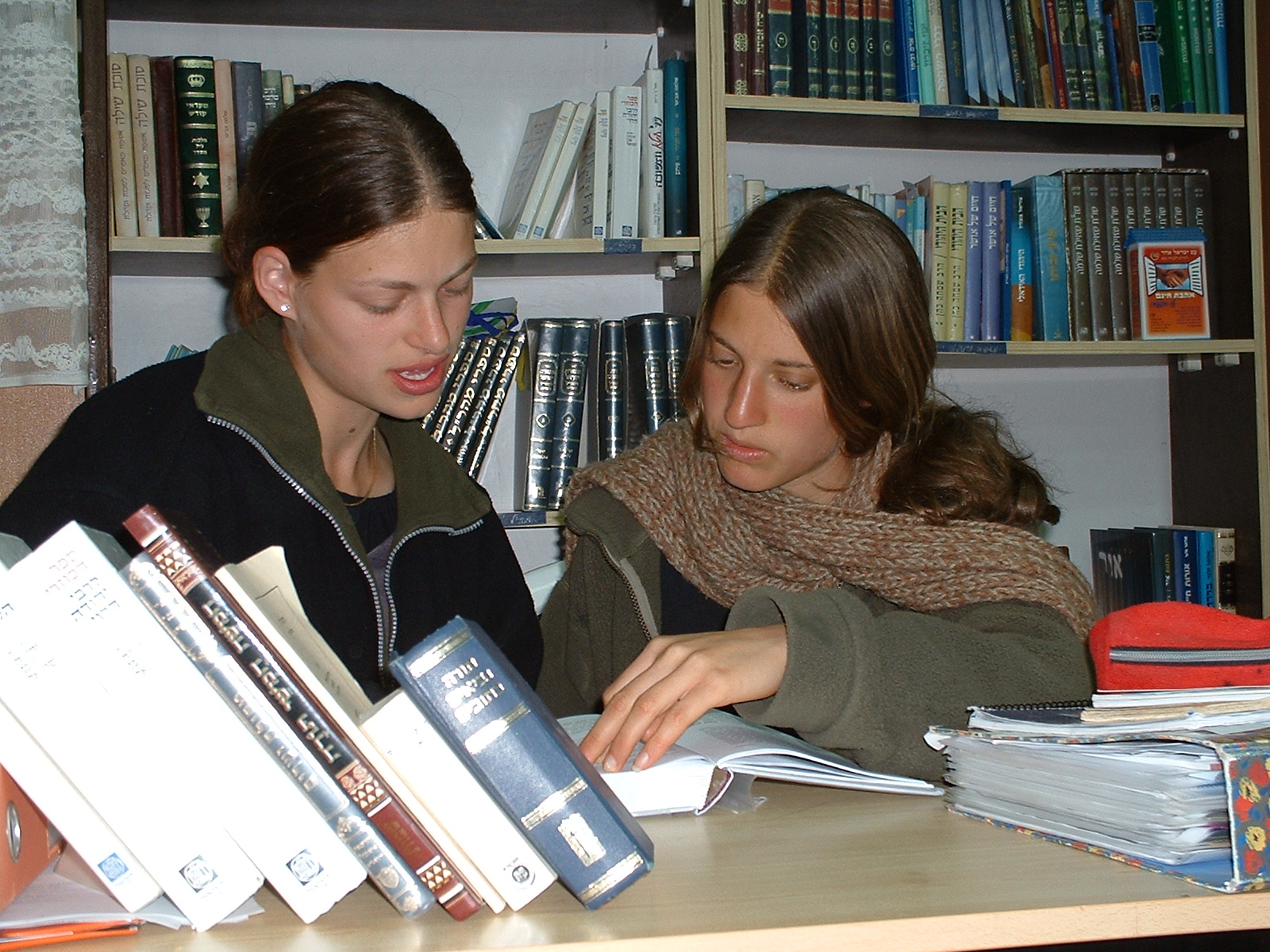
Female students Chavrusa-studying at Midreshet Shilat in Israel

Devoting a year to Torah study in the modern Land of Israel is a common practice among American, and, to a lesser extent, European, South African, South American, and Australian Modern Orthodox Jews. Young adults spend a year studying Torah in the Land of Israel. It is common both among males and females, with the boys normally going to a yeshiva and the girls to a midrasha (often called seminary or seminaria). Yeshivot with year-in-Israel programs include: Mir yeshiva (Jerusalem), Yeshivat Sha'alvim, Yeshivat Kerem B'Yavneh, Yeshivat Har Etzion, Yeshivas Midrash Shmuel, Yeshivat HaMivtar, Machon Meir, Dvar Yerushalayim, Aish HaTorah, and Ohr Somayach. Seminaries, or midrashot, include: Midreshet HaRova, Midreshet Lindenbaum, Migdal Oz, Nishmat, B'not Chava, Michlalah-Jerusalem College, Neve Yerushalayim.

Multi-year programs also exist: Hasidic and Haredi boys from abroad often spend many years studying in the Land of Israel. Bnei Akiva offers a number of options to spend a year of study in Israel, as part of their Hachshara programs.

== See also ==
- Chazal
- Torah
- Talmud
- Tanach
- Halacha
- Chitas
- Chayenu
- Devar Malchot

== Bibliography ==
- A Practical Guide to Torah Learning, D. Landesman, Jason Aronson 1995. ISBN 1-56821-320-4
