= Alexander Süsskind Kantshiger =

Alexander Süsskind Kantshiger (Hebrew: אלכסנדר זיסקינד קאנטשיגר; fl. 18th century) was a Jewish Biblical scholar. He was the author of Miẓnefet Bad, a series of dissertations on the arrangement of the Pentateuch, divided according to the weekly portions.

== Publications ==
- Miẓnefet Bad [The Linen Miter] (in Hebrew). Zolkiev. 1747.
