= Tzena =

Tzena may refer to:

- Kožuf, a mountain between Greece and Northern Macedonia
- Tzena, a period of austerity in Israel from 1949 to 1959
- Tzena u’Renah, a Yiddish-language prose work from the 1590s
- Tzena, Tzena, Tzena, a Hebrew song written in 1941

== See also ==
- Tzniut
