= Abraham Azulai =

Kabbalistic author and commentator (1570–1643)

Abraham ben Mordecai Azulai
- אברהם בן מרדכי אזולאי
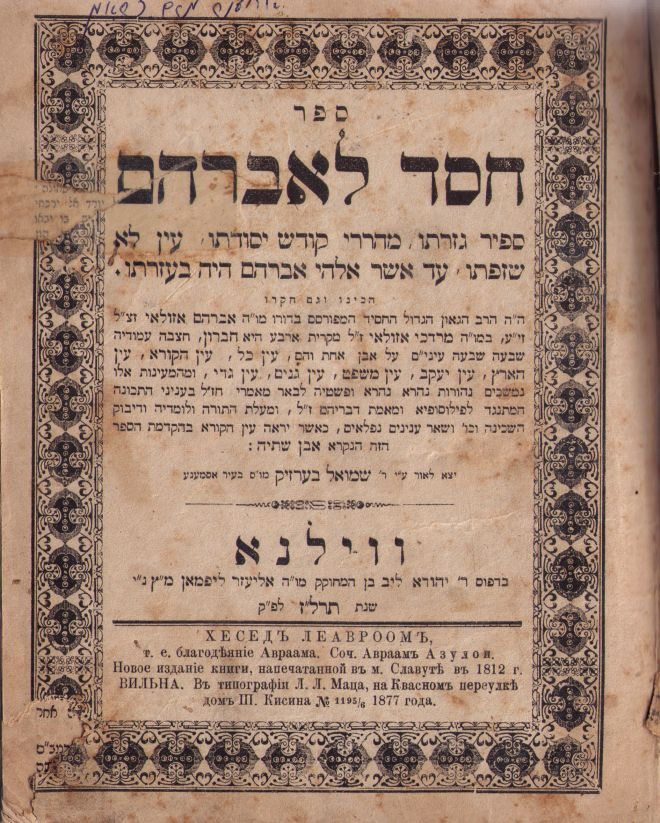
- Title page of Chesed Le'Avraham by Abraham Azulai, published in Vilna, 1877

Personal life
- Born: c. 1570 Fez, Morocco
- Died: 6 November 1643 (aged 72–73) Hebron, Ottoman Empire
- Notable works: Kiryat Arba; Chesed le-Abraham; Ba'ale Berit Abraham
- Known for: Commentary on the Zohar, Chesed le-Abraham
- Occupation: Kabbalistic author and commentator

Religious life
- Religion: Judaism

Abraham ben Mordecai Azulai (c. 1570–1643) (Hebrew: אברהם בן מרדכי אזולאי) was a Kabbalistic author and commentator born in Fez, Morocco. In 1599 he moved to Ottoman Palestine and settled in Hebron.

== Biography ==
In Hebron, Azulai wrote a commentary on the Zohar under the title City of Four (קִרְיַת־אַרְבַּע, a reference to the place of death of Sarah in Genesis 23:2, which bore this name and was identified as the foundation town Hebron grew from.

However, the Hebron and Jerusalem Epidemic of 1619 drove him from his new home, and while in Gaza City, where he found refuge, he wrote his Kabbalistic work Sefer Ḥesed le-Avraham (חֶ֖סֶד לְאַבְרָהָ֑ם, "Book of Loyalty to Abraham", a reference to Micah 7:20). It was published in 1685 after the author's death by Meshulam Zalman ben Avraham Berakh of Gorice in Amsterdam. The work is a treatise with an introduction, אבן השתיה (Foundation Stone; Yoma 53b:10), and is divided into seven 'fountains', each fountain being subdivided into a number of 'streams'. A specimen of the Sefer Ḥesed le-Avraham, taken from the fifth fountain, twenty-fourth stream, p. 57d, of the Amsterdam edition:

On the mystery of Gilgul (reincarnation) and its details: Know that God will not subject the soul of the wicked to more than three migrations; for it is written, "Lo, all these things doth God work twice, yea thrice, with a man" (Job xxxiii. 29). Which means, He makes him appear twice and thrice in a human incarnation; but the fourth time he is incarnated as a clean animal. And when a man offers a sacrifice, God will, by miraculous intervention, make him select an animal that is an incarnation of a human being. Then will the sacrifice be doubly profitable: to the one that offers it and to the soul imprisoned in the brute. For with the smoke of the sacrifice the soul ascends heavenward and attains its original purity. Thus is explained the mystery involved in the words, "O Lord, thou preservest man and beast" (Psalms xxxvi.7 [R. V. 6]).

A popular story about Rabbi Azulai is that of how he retrieved the sultan's sword. When the Ottoman sultan visited Hebron, his precious sword fell into the Cave of the Patriarchs. Anyone sent down to retrieve it disappeared. Only Rabbi Azulai was able to descend into the cave and retrieve the sword.

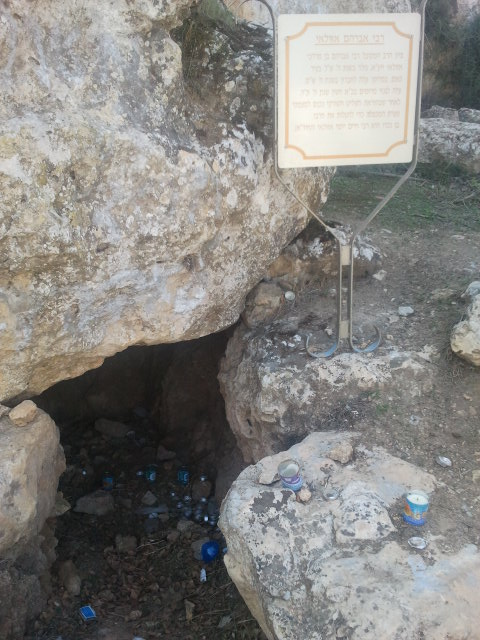
Grave of Abraham Azulai in the Old Jewish cemetery, Hebron.

Azulay died in Hebron on November 6, 1643 and is buried in the Old Jewish Cemetery in Hebron.

One of the manuscripts that he left to his descendant, Chaim Yosef David Azulai, is also published. It is a Kabalistic commentary on the Hebrew Bible, Ba'ale Berit Abraham (Abraham's Confederates, a reference to Genesis 14.13), Vilna, 1873.

- Pirkei Avot – a selection from Chesed le-Abraham

== Jewish Encyclopedia ==
- Azoulay, Shem ha-Gedolim, s.v.;
- Isaac ben Jacob Benjacob, Oẓar ha-Sefarim, p. 196;
- Julius Fürst, Bibliotheca Judaica, i.67;
- Michael, Heimann Joseph (1891). Or ha-Ḥayyim. Frankfort-on-the-Main. p. 12.
