= Sefer Hamitzvot =

Work by Maimonides

- ספר המצוות

Information
- Religion: Judaism
- Author: Maimonides
- Language: Judaeo-Arabic, Hebrew
- Period: 12th century
- Sefer Hamitzvot at Hebrew Wikisource

Sefer Hamitzvot ("Book of Commandments", Hebrew: ספר המצוות; Judeo-Arabic: כתאב אלפראיץׄ) is a work listing all the commandments of the Torah, with a brief description for each, and was written by the 12th-century rabbi, philosopher, and physician, Moses Maimonides. While there are various other works titled similarly, the title "Sefer Hamitzvot" without a modifier refers to Maimonides' work.

It originally appeared in Judaeo-Arabic under the title "Kitab al-Farai'd", and was translated into Hebrew by the Provençal rabbi Moses ibn Tibbon (first printed 1497) as well as by ibn Hasdai, in the 13th century. A new Hebrew translation from the original Judaeo-Arabic was made by the noted Yemenite scholar, Rabbi Yosef Qafih.

== Premise ==
In the work, Maimonides lists all the 613 mitzvot traditionally contained in the Torah (Pentateuch). He describes the following fourteen principles (Hebrew: כללים) to guide his selection. (For each rule, Maimonides cites many illustrative examples. We present only one or two examples for each rule.)

1. Commandments of Rabbinic origin (from the Oral Law) are not counted. This rule excludes lighting candles on Hanukkah and reading the Scroll of Esther on Purim.
2. Commandments that were derived using the 13 hermeneutic rules (Rabbi Yishmael's Rules) are not counted. This rule excludes reverence for Torah scholars, which Rabbi Akiva derived from the verse, "You must revere God your Lord" (Deuteronomy 10:20).
3. Commandments that are not historically permanent are not counted. This rule excludes the prohibition that Levites aged 50 years or older may not serve in the Tabernacle (Numbers 8:25).
4. Commandments that encompass the entire Torah are not counted. This rule excludes the command to "keep everything that I have instructed you" (Exodus 23:13).
5. The reason for a commandment is not counted as a separate commandment. For example, the Torah forbids a wife to remarry her first husband after she has married a second husband. The Torah then adds, "and do not bring guilt upon the land" (Deuteronomy 24:4). This last statement is a reason that explains the preceding prohibition, so it is not counted separately.
6. For a commandment with both positive and negative components, the positive component counts as a positive instruction, while the negative component counts as a negative prohibition. For example, the Torah commands to rest on the Sabbath and forbids against doing work on that day. Resting counts as a positive instruction, and working counts as a negative prohibition.
7. Details of a commandment, that define how it applies, are not counted. For example, the Torah commands certain sinners to bring an animal sin-offering. If they cannot afford it, they may bring two birds instead; and if they cannot afford birds, they may bring a flour-offering instead (Leviticus 5). Thus, a wealthy sinner sacrifices an animal, but a destitute sinner brings a flour-offering. This type of variable sin-offering (the korban `oleh ve-yored) counts as one commandment, even though it includes three different scenarios, depending on the wealth of the sinner.
8. The negation of an obligation (Hebrew: shelilah, "is not") is not treated as a prohibition (azharah, "do not"). This appears obvious, but confusion arises because the Hebrew word lo can mean either "is not" or "do not." The rule excludes the statement that a Jewish maidservant "shall not leave [her master] the way other slaves leave" (Exodus 21:7). A master who causes his male slave to lose an eye, tooth or limb must grant him freedom, but the female maidservant is not granted such freedom. The verse simply states a fact; it does not command or forbid any activity, so it does not count.
9. Even if the same instruction or prohibition is repeated many times, it counts only once. In other words, it is correct to count the number of concepts, not the number of statements. For example, the Torah prohibits eating blood in seven different verses (Leviticus 3:17, 7:26 and elsewhere), but this prohibition counts only once.
10. Introductory preparations for performance of a commandment are not counted separately. For example, priests are commanded to place showbread (lechem ha-panim) on the Table (shulchan) in the Tabernacle. The details regarding how to bake the bread (Leviticus 24:5-7) are not counted.
11. The parts of a commandment are not counted separately if their combination is necessary for that commandment. For example, the four species for Sukkot are considered one commandment, not four, because a person cannot fulfill this commandment without all four species.
12. The activities necessary to fulfill a commandment are not counted separately. For example, the slaughtering of a burnt-offering (`olah), and sprinkling its blood, and removing the animal's hide, etc. are not counted separately. Rather, the entire process of sacrificing an olah counts as one commandment.
13. A commandment that is performed on many days is only counted once. For example, the additional mussaf offering for the seven days of Sukkot counts as one commandment, even though a different number of cows is offered each day. (See positive commandment number 50.)
14. Each form of punishment is counted as a positive instruction. For example, the Torah commands Beit Din to apply capital punishment by stoning to a blasphemer (Leviticus 24:16), a Molech worshipper (20:2), and other sinners. This punishment counts once, even though it appears in many different contexts.

== Commentaries ==
The work is the subject of a number of commentaries, including one from Nahmanides, one titled Megillath Esther ("Scroll of Esther", by Isaac Leon ibn Zur (although often incorrectly attributed to Isaac de Leon), bearing no direct relationship with the Biblical Book of Esther), and others titled Lev Sameach (by Rabbi Abraham Allegri) and Kinath Soferim. In an appendix, Nahmanides lists commandments that might have merited individual inclusion in his estimation.

== See also ==
- Daily Rambam Study
- Sefer Mitzvot Gadol
- Sefer Mitzvot Katan
- Sefer ha-Chinuch
