= Aaron Walden =

Aaron Walden (born at Warsaw about 1835, died 1912) was a Polish Jewish Talmudist, editor, and author.

Walden, who was an ardent adherent of Ḥasidism, is known especially for his "Shem ha-Gedolim he-Ḥadash" (Warsaw, 1864), a work of the same nature as Azulai's "Shem ha-Gedolim." Like the latter, it consists of two parts:

- "Ma'areket Gedolim," being an alphabetical list of the names of authors and rabbis, mostly those that lived after Azulai, but including also many of the seventeenth and eighteenth centuries who were omitted by Azulai; and
- "Ma'areket Sefarim," an alphabetical list of book-titles.

Walden himself says in his preface that he took Azulai's "Shem ha-Gedolim" as a model; and it is evident that he refers to Isaac Benjacob's edition of that work. The alphabetical list in the first part is arranged only according to the first names of the persons mentioned. In many instances the names are accompanied by biographical sketches, especially of Ḥasidic rabbis, whose biographies contain records of the miracles wrought by them and in behalf of them. To the third edition of the work, published in 1882 by Walden's son Joseph Aryeh Löb, the latter added an appendix entitled "'En Zoker," containing names and book-titles omitted in the two previous editions.

Another work by Walden, in which he displayed great erudition, is the "MiḲdash Me'at" (Warsaw, 1890), an edition of the Psalms in five volumes. In it are printed around the text:

- "Bet ha-Midrash," a kind of yalḲuṭ after the model of the "Yalḳuṭ Shim'oni," Walden having gathered all the haggadot referring to the Psalms which were scattered in the Talmudim, in the midrashic literature, and in the Targum, as well as in the Zohar and other cabalistic works
- "Bet ha-Keneset," a fourfold commentary ("PaRDeS") consisting of material taken from the most prominent ancient commentators; and
- "Bet Aharon," a reference index to the "Bet ha-Midrash," giving also variants and an explanation of difficult passages.

Walden also published an edition of Rabbi Abraham Saba's work "Zeror Ha-Mor" (Warsaw, August 1879), in which he stated that he had corrected various errors and misprints that had crept into the second and third printings of 1546 and 1566 respectively (both in Venice). This edition was printed by the printing house of Nathan Schriftgiesser.
