= Aaron Moses Taubes =

Romanian rabbi and writer (1787–1852)

Aaron Moses ben Jacob Taubes (Hebrew: אהרן משה בן יעקב טויבש; 1787–1852) was a Galician-born Romanian rabbi and writer.

== Biography ==
Taubes was born in Lemberg in 1787. He became rabbi of Sniatyn and its districts in 1820, and in 1841 was appointed rabbi of Iași, where he remained until his death. He died in Iași in 1852.

He corresponded on halakhic subjects with Rabbis Shlomo Kluger and Jacob Meshullam Ornstein, as well as with the latter's son.

== Works ==
His works are: (1) "To'afot Re'em" (תועפות ראם), responsa on the four parts of the Shulchan Aruch. Among these are some written to his son Samuel and some to his grandson Shalom Taubes (Zolkiev, 1855). (2) "Ḳarne Re'em" (קרני ראם), novellæ on the Talmud, mentioned in "She'elat Shalom," No. 254. (3) Novellæ on Alfasi (according to Aaron Walden in his "Shem ha-Gedolim he-Ḥadash," Let. A, No. 129), which remained in manuscript.
