= Jacob al-Faraji =

Egyptian rabbi

Jacob al-Faraji (Hebrew: יעקב פראג׳י מהמה), also known as the Maharif (מהרי״ף), was a rabbi in Alexandria, Egypt, in the mid-seventeenth century. He was the brother-in-law of Shabbethai Nawawi, rabbi of Rashid, and also served as the mentor to Samuel Laniado.

Al-Faraji was the author of responsa, some of which were incorporated into the compilation Birke Yosef published by Ḥayyim Joseph David Azulai (Leghorn, 1774–1776). One of his responsa was featured in Ginnat Veradim by Abraham ben Mordecai ha-Levi (Constantinople, 1716–18).
