= Women's Bible =

Women's Bible may refer to:

- Tz'enah Ur'enah, a 1616 Yiddish-language prose work
- The Woman's Bible, an 1890s feminist critique of the Bible
