= Alexandre Créhange =

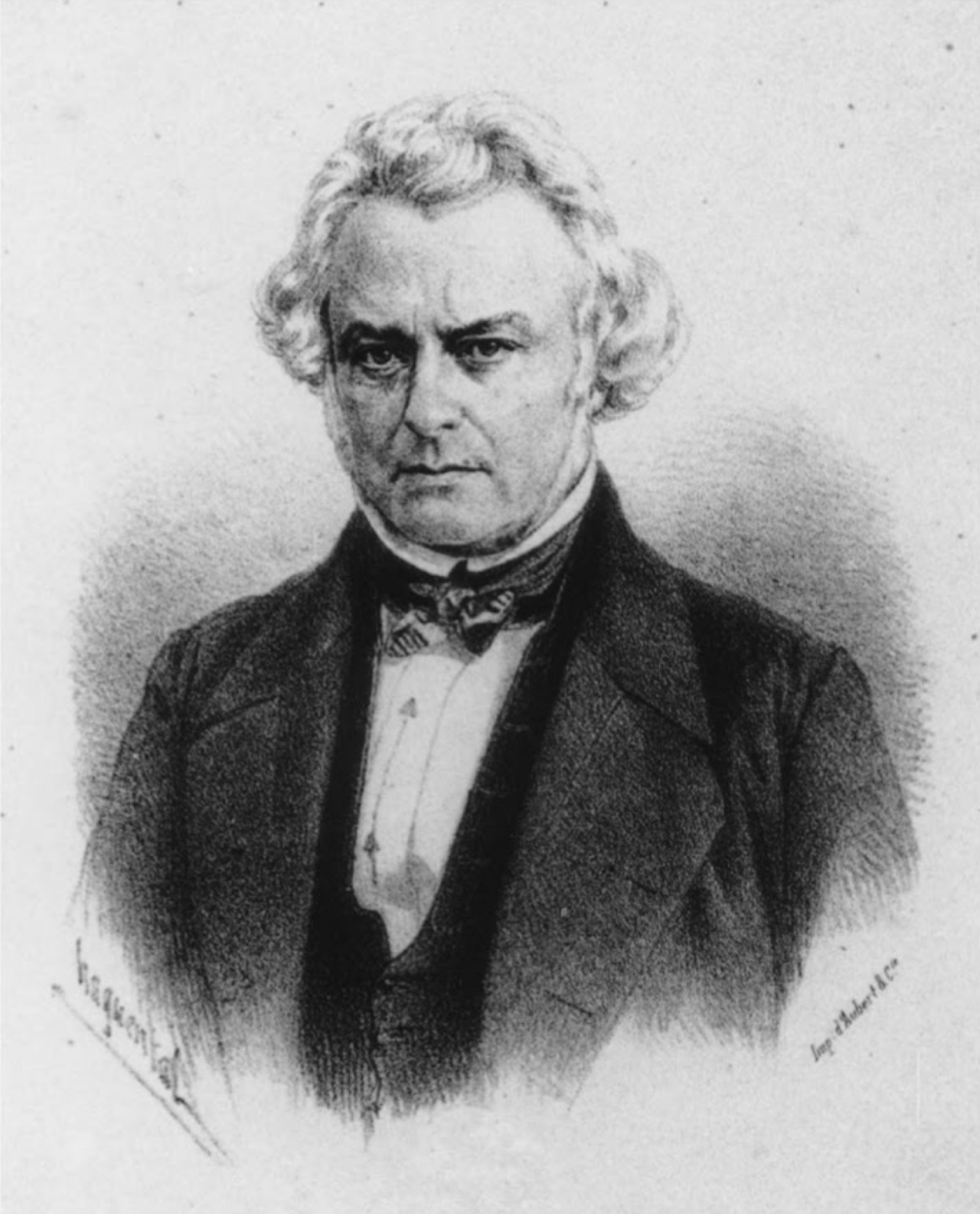
- Born: February 10, 1791; Étain, Meurthe-et-Moselle, Kingdom of France
- Died: January 7, 1872 (aged 80); Paris, French Third Republic
- Spouse: Elisa Créhange (d. 1866)
- Writing career
- Pen name: Ben Baruch
- Language: French and Hebrew

Alexandre ben Baruch Créhange (Hebrew: אָלֶכְּסַנְדֶּר בֵּן בָּרוּךְ קרעהאַנש; 10 February 1791 – 7 January 1872), who wrote under the pen name Ben Baruch, was a French Jewish writer and communal leader.

== Biography ==
Créhange was born to a religious Jewish family in Étain, a small town in Lorraine, where his father worked as hazzan of the local synagogue. By 1801, the family had moved to Dijon. He moved at a young age to Germany to work at a commercial house, but returned to France after going bankrupt. There he worked as a peddler and bookkeeper in Saint-Étienne, while serving as head of the Jewish community of nearby Lyon.

Créhange moved to Paris in the 1830s. A supporter of the French Revolution of 1848, he published "La Marseillaise du travail", in which he provided new words to La Marseillaise to celebrate the cause of the proletariat, and a pamphlet purporting to show how the Tanakh prescribes a republic as the optimal form of government. At the same time, he became the spokesman for the Parisian Orthodox community in a series of disputes with the Consistoire central, which he saw as representing the interests of the Jewish elite. In 1848 he organized the Club démocratique des fidèles, which promoted republicanism and civic responsibility, and started a weekly periodical, La Vérité, in which he defended the rights of the Orthodox. He ardently lobbied for the introduction of universal male suffrance in consistorial elections. Créhange also advocated against the heavy taxes imposed by the Consistoire on meat sold by butchers that it authorized as kosher, the sale of seats and aliyot in the synagogue, the costly dues for burial rites and plots, and the ban on private prayer assemblies.

Créhange was one of the ten founders of the Alliance Israélite Universelle, of which he served as vice-president in 1863–1864, and would later become secretary of the Comité de Bienfaisance Israélite and the Consistoire central.

== Publications ==
Créhange translated and edited a number of liturgical volumes during the Second Empire. In 1846, Créhange published in two volumes a French translation of the Tseno Ureno under the title La Semaine Israélite, ou le Tzeéna Ouréna Moderne, Entretiens de Josué Hadass avec sa Famille sur les Saintes Ećritures. He also published a translation into French of the Hagaddah (1847); a book of prayers of the French Jews entitled Tefillat 'Adat Yeshurun (1850); Minḥah Ḥadashah, prayers of the Sephardic Jews (1855); an illustrated translation of Tehillim (1858); festival prayers for the use of Franco-Spanish and Franco-Portuguese Jews (6 vols., 1861–63); and from 1850 to 1872 an almanac, Annuaire Parisien.

He edited two periodicals: La paix, revue religieuse, morale et littéraire (1846) and Annuaire parisien du culte israélite (1851–71).
