= Avner Cohen Casa Chabad =

Jewish community centre in Portugal

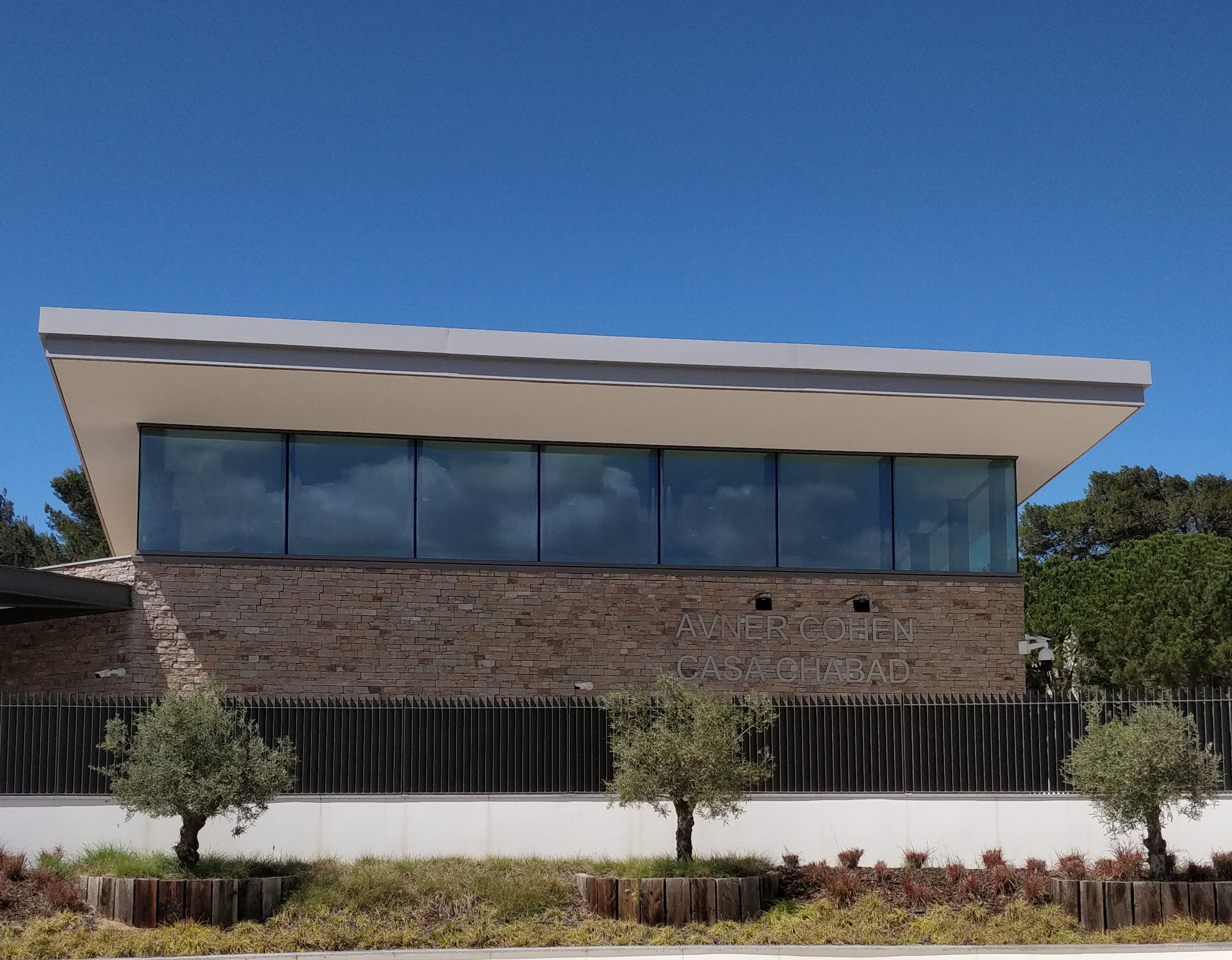
- Avner Cohen Chabad House, Cascais

Religion
- Affiliation: Jewish
- Sect: Hasidic
- Governing body: Chabad Organization, Portugal
- Year consecrated: 2020

Location
- Location: Rua Aristides de Sousa Mendes
- Municipality: Cascais
- State: Lisbon district
- Country: Portugal
- Interactive map of Avner Cohen Casa Chabad
- Coordinates: 38.6996°N 9.4431°W

Architecture
- Architect: Sua Kay Architects
- Site area: 5,000 m2

Website
- https://www.chabadportugal.com/

The Avner Cohen Casa Chabad (Avner Cohen Chabad House) is a Jewish community centre situated in Cascais in the Lisbon District of Portugal. It includes a library that places special emphasis on works about the Torah, either those written by Portuguese Jewish scholars or printed in Portugal in the late 15th century.

== The Chabad movement ==
Chabad houses are Jewish community centres in which the rabbi and his wife host programmes, activities, and services for the local Jewish community and visitors. They offer outreach to unaffiliated Jews and humanitarian aid, as well as religious, cultural and educational activities. These centres are to be found around the world and aim to celebrate Jewish tradition. Each centre provides an informal place to learn about and observe Judaism and seeks to provide an atmosphere in which all Jews feel comfortable, not just those of the Orthodox Hasidic branch of the Jewish faith, under which they were established.

The word "Chabad" is a Hebrew acronym for the three intellectual faculties of chochmah — wisdom, binah — comprehension, and da'at — knowledge. Chabad was founded by Schneur Zalman of Liadi (1745–1812), the first Rebbe of Chabad. For more than a century the movement was based in Lubavitch in Russia, and it is thus often referred to as Chabad Lubavitch. From its inception, it swept through Russia and surrounding countries. Eventually the philosophy of Chabad Lubavitch reached most parts of the world and affected almost every facet of Jewish life.

The movement is guided by the teachings of its seven leaders (Rebbes), beginning with Rabbi Schneur Zalman of Liadi. These leaders created a body of work of thousands of books, concerning themselves not only with Chabad-Lubavitch, but with all Jewish life. The origins of the Chabad-Lubavitch organization that operates Chabad houses can be traced to the early 1940s, when the sixth Rebbe, Rabbi Yosef Yitzchak Schneersohn (1880–1950), appointed his son-in-law, and later successor as Rebbe, Rabbi Menachem Mendel Schneersohn, to head the newly founded educational and social service arms of the movement. Schneersohn had been a refugee who passed through Portugal in World War II. Today 4,000 full-time emissary families direct more than 3,300 Chabad institutions, covering most parts of the world. In a Chabad house, the Shaliach and Shlucha (rabbi and his wife) host programmes, activities, and services for the local Jewish community and for visitors.

== Origins of the Cascais Chabad house ==
Despite having a strong Jewish tradition, Portugal was one of the few countries in Europe without a Chabad house. The establishment of the Chabad house in Cascais can be traced back to the arrival in Portugal in 2006 of an American student, Eli Rosenfeld, to conduct research on the history of Judaism in Portugal in the 15th century, in which he identified around 40 rabbis who lived in Portugal before and at the beginning of the Inquisition. This led, in 2018, to the publication of a book Vozes Judaicas de Portugal (Jewish Voices from Portugal), with contributions by Marcelo Rebelo de Sousa, the president of Portugal and by the mayor of Cascais.

In 2010, Rosenfeld was appointed as the shaliach, the Chabad-Lubavitch emissary to Portugal. In the same year the Portuguese Chabad organization was founded, known as Rohr Chabad Portugal in acknowledgement of financial contributions from the Rohr family from New York City. Rosenfeld settled in Cascais, where there is a sizeable Jewish community, and approached the Mayor of Cascais for assistance with finding a permanent home for the organization. In July 2016, the municipality of Cascais agreed to allocate a plot of land in the Costa da Guia area of Cascais for a nominal rent and the Avner Cohen Casa Chabad, dedicated by the Cohen family, was opened in 2020.

The total area is 5,000 m2, with the building being 1,000 m2. There is a sensory garden of 2,080 m2. The main atrium is dedicated to Rabbi Isaac Aboab of Castile, who died in Porto. The establishment of the Chabad house caused controversy amongst some of the local residents who wanted the land, which had been exchanged by the municipality with the Catholic Church for other land, to be used as a park. In September 2017, more than a hundred residents demonstrated against the construction of the centre and there was a further demonstration in February 2018.

=== Avner Cohen ===
Avner Cohen, after whom the Chabad House is named, was born in 1936 in Tel Aviv. After his military service, he studied textile engineering in England and then worked in the textile business in the United States, where he met his wife, Dina. Returning to Israel he established a dye factory for the textile industry in Beit Shemesh. He was a major benefactor to the Yemenite community, establishing the 'Beit Yosef' synagogue. Dina Cohen and other members of the family visited the Chabad House in 2022.

== Library ==
The Aaron and Joshua Nasser library is seen as not only a resource for the Jewish community in Portugal but also as part of the heritage of Portugal and is open to both Jewish and non-Jewish researchers. It places special emphasis on works about the Torah, either written by Portuguese Jewish scholars or printed in Portugal in the brief period between when printing was introduced into the country in 1487 and when Judaism was banned ten years later. It contains a copy of the first book printed in the Portuguese capital of Lisbon, in 1489, which was a commentary of Nachmanides on the Torah. There are also the original editions of the work of Abraham Saba who, facing persecution in Lisbon, dug a hole under an olive tree where he hid his work on the Torah. Unable to recover them, after being deported to Morocco, Saba dedicated himself to rewriting his original book from memory. First published in Venice in 1523 by Daniel Bomberg, this book is also in the library.

There are also documents that demonstrate the work of censors during the early Inquisition as well as some of the work of the royal astronomer to the Portuguese king, Rabbi Abraham Zacuto, which helped guide Christopher Columbus to the New World. Other important items in the library include original leaves from the Book of Joshua, printed in Leiria, Portugal, in 1494 and, more recent, a facsimile of a handwritten Torah thought penned by the Rebbe, Rabbi Menachem Mendel, while in Lisbon, having escaped Nazi-occupied France and while waiting to board a ship to America.

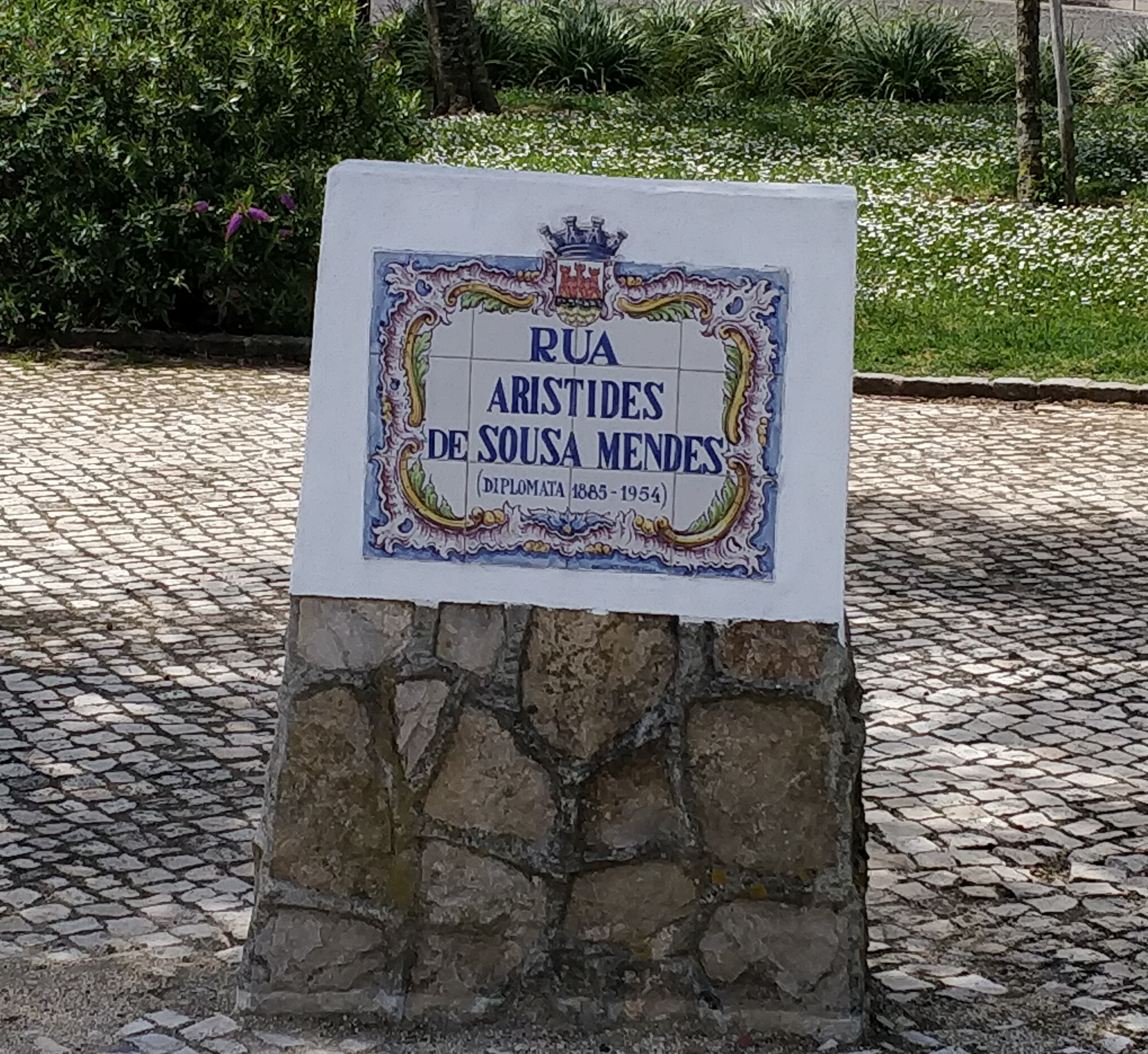
Rua Aristides de Sousa Mendes, Cascais

== Remembering Aristides de Sousa Mendes ==
In parallel with the official opening of the Chabad House, the road leading to it was renamed as Rua Aristides de Sousa Mendes. Sousa Mendes was a Portuguese consul in Bordeaux, France who facilitated visas for thousands of Jews and others escaping Nazi occupation during World War II. For his efforts to save Jewish refugees, he was recognized by Israel as one of the Righteous Among the Nations in 1966. In 2021 a memorial to him was installed in the Portuguese Pantheon in Lisbon.
