= Abraham Allegri =

17th-century rabbi and writer

Rabbi Abraham Allegri
- אברהם אליגרי
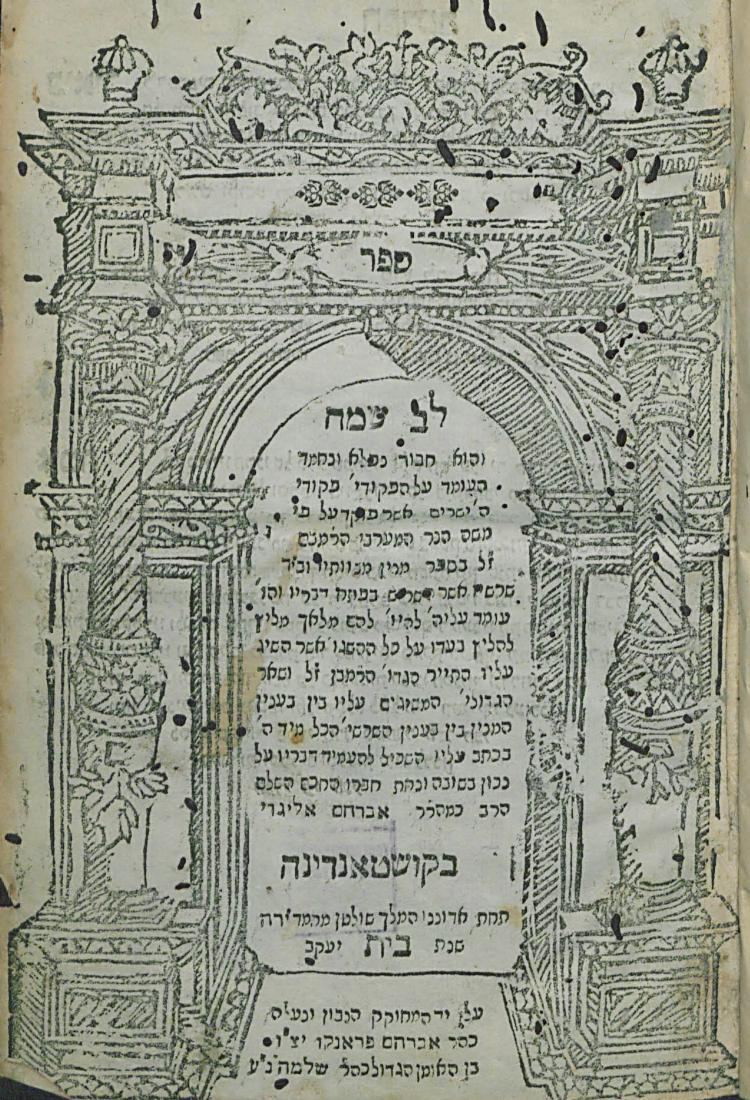
- Title page of "Leb Sameaḥ", Constantinople, 1652

Personal life
- Occupation: rabbi

Religious life
- Religion: Judaism

Abraham Allegri (Hebrew: אברהם אליגרי) was a rabbi and writer who lived at Constantinople about the middle of the seventeenth century. He was a contemporary of Rabbi Moses Benveniste.

== Biography ==
Allegri wrote a commentary on the "Sefer Hamitzvot" of Maimonides, in which he defended him against the attacks of Nachmanides. He published this work at Constantinople, in 1652, under the title "Leb Sameaḥ" (A Gladsome Heart) — referring thereby to his own name, Allegri. A number of his responsa were published under the same title in Salonica, 1793.
