= Jacob ben Isaac Ashkenazi =

Polish rabbi (1550-1625), author of popular devotional texts

Rabbi Jacob ben Isaac Ashkenazi (1550–1625), of Janów (near Lublin, Poland), was the author of the Tseno Ureno, sometimes called the "Women's Bible", a Yiddish-language prose work written around the 1590s whose structure parallels the weekly portions of the Pentateuch and Haftorahs used in Shabbat services.

He also wrote a supplement, the Melitz Yosher (מליץ יושר) and Seyfer Ha Magid (המגיד). Ha Magid, which literally means "the book that tells" or "the messenger book" in the biblical sense, as in "the messenger came to David saying" in 2 Samuel 15:13, is a similar compilation on the Prophets and Hagiographa.

== See also ==
- Role of women in Judaism
- Tzeniut
- Yiddish language
- Yiddish literature
