= Daily Rambam Study =

Annual Torah study cycle

Daily Rambam Study is an annual study cycle that includes the daily study of Maimonides' magnum opus, Mishneh Torah. The study regimen was initiated by Rabbi Menachem Mendel Schneerson in the spring of 1984 with three tracks. The first track includes studying three chapters a day, so that the entire fourteen books are completed in less than one year. Participants in the second track study one chapter daily and complete the entire Mishneh Torah in approximately three years. A third track that parallels the three chapter track includes the study of Sefer Hamitzvos.

In establishing the new study cycle, Rabbi Schneerson cited a unique quality of Mishneh Torah that it is inclusive of the entire Torah. By learning Rambam, one effectively learns the entire Torah. If all Jewish people united in the daily study cycle, Jewish unity could be accomplished. This study aims to bring about Torah unity and Jewish unity simultaneously.

The completion of each cycle is celebrated with a Siyum Harambam. Such events are held worldwide with the participation of many thousands of people. These celebrations are attended by Jewish leaders from different communities.

On 9 July 2020 all three tracks completed the Rambam learning cycle. The 3 chapter daily track completed its 39th cycle while the one chapter daily track completed its 13th.

== See also ==
- Chayenu
- For other study cycles, see Torah study § Study cycles
