= Isaac de Leon =

Isaac de Leon, who lived at Ocaña, in Toledo, Spain, was one of the last rabbis of Castile. He was a native of Leon, and a pupil of Isaac Campanton, and, like Moses de Leon, a kabbalist and a believer in miracles. Joseph Caro and others honored him with the title of "the great teacher." He was more than seventy years of age at his death, which occurred some years before the expulsion of the Jews from Spain; he was mourned by many pupils. The work ascribed to him, Megillat Ester, an answer to Nahmanides' criticism of Maimonides' Sefer ha-Miẓwot, has been proved by Azulai to belong to Isaac Leon ibn Zur, a later writer.

== Jewish Encyclopedia bibliography ==
- David Conforte, Ḳore ha-Dorot, p. 28a;
- Zacuto, Yuḥasin, p. 226;
- Joseph Cohen, 'Emek ha-Bakah, p. 83;
- Azulai, Shem ha-Gedolim, i. 105;
- Heinrich Grätz, Gesch. viii. 225
