= Raphael Isaiah Azulai =

Italian rabbi

Personal life
- Born: c. 1743
- Died: 1826 (aged 82–83) (possibly 1830; see article) Ancona, Papal States
- Parent: Chaim Joseph David Azulai (father)

Religious life
- Religion: Judaism

Raphael Isaiah Azulai (Hebrew: רפאל ישעיה אזולאי; c. born in Hebron 1743 – 9 Shvat, 1826 or possibly 1830) was a rabbi in Ancona until his death. He was the firstborn of Rabbi Chaim Yosef David Azulai. One of his daughters married Abraham Pardo, son of the renowned rabbi David Pardo; and her grandson Moses Pardo was rabbi of Alexandria from 1871 to 1888. He was the author of a number of responsa and decisions, which appeared partly under the title Tiferet Mosheh (The Splendor of Moses), and partly in the Zikron Mosheh of his son Moses (No. 10).

Descendants currently live across the Middle East and North Africa.

== See also ==
- History of the Jews in Ancona
