= Abraham Saba =

Castilian preacher

Abraham Saba (1440–1508) was a rabbi in Castile who became a pupil of Isaac de Leon. At the time of the expulsion of the Jews from Spain he took refuge in Portugal, where he met with further misfortune; for scarcely had he settled in Porto when King Manuel I of Portugal ordered all Jews to be expelled from Portugal, all Jewish children to become Christians, and all Hebrew books to be burned (December 24, 1496). Saba's two sons were forcibly taken from him, and he fled from Porto, abandoning his entire library and succeeding only at the risk of his life in saving his own works in manuscript.

He fled to Lisbon, but before reaching there was told of a new order of the king decreeing the death of any Jew with whom a Hebrew book or tefillin (phylacteries) were found. He hid his manuscripts and tefillin under an olive-tree and entered the city. Upon leaving Lisbon he attempted to recover his hidden treasure, but being discovered by the king's guards, he was thrown into prison, and after a six months' confinement was sent across the frontier. He went to Fez, Morocco, where he resided for ten years. Soon after his arrival he fell ill; his great privations and terrible sufferings having undermined his health.

== Works ==
On his recovery he recommitted to paper from memory the following works, the original manuscripts of which had been lost in Portugal:

- Eshkol ha-Kofer (A Cluster of Camphire), a commentary on the Book of Ruth and Book of Esther. Fragments of commentary to Ecclesiastes, Lamentations, and Song of Songs were published under the same title by Betzalel Wicholder (Bnei Brak, 2012).
- Ẓeror ha-Mor (Bundle of Myrrh), a commentary on the Pentateuch, containing interpretations according to both the ordinary sense and the mystical method of the Zohar
- Ẓeror ha-Ḥayyim (Bundle of Life), commentary on Avot and the liturgy (Bnei Brak, 2015). Mentioned in his commentary on Genesis, pp. 3 and 5.
- Introduction to the Sefirot, published by Betzalel Wicholder in Tzeror ha-Hayyim (Bnei Brak, 2015)
- Ẓeror ha-Kesef (Bundle of Silver), halakhic. Lost.
- A manuscript of his commentary on the Book of Job was in Jellinek's library. Lost.

According to Chida, who read the anecdote in a work entitled Divrei Yosef, Abraham in journeying from Fez to Verona became sick on the ship in mid-ocean during a great storm. The captain, unable to control the ship, had given up all hope, and implored Rabbi Abraham to pray for divine assistance. Abraham stipulated that in case of his death his body should be delivered to the Jewish community of Verona, and then prayed for the safety of the vessel. His prayer was heard, the storm abated, and the ship went safely on. Two days later Abraham died, and the captain, keeping his promise, brought the body to Verona, where it was buried with great honors.

Abraham Saba is not to be confounded with Abraham Saba of Adrianpolou, who is mentioned in the responsa of Elijah Mizraḥi, No. 52.
