= Blanche Azoulay =

Algerian lawyer

- Occupation: Lawyer
- Years active: 1908–?
- Known for: First woman to become a lawyer in Algeria

Blanche Azoulay was the first woman to become a lawyer in Algeria, upon being called to the Bar of Algiers in 1908.
