= Tz'enah Ur'enah =

Yiddish-language devotional prose text for women

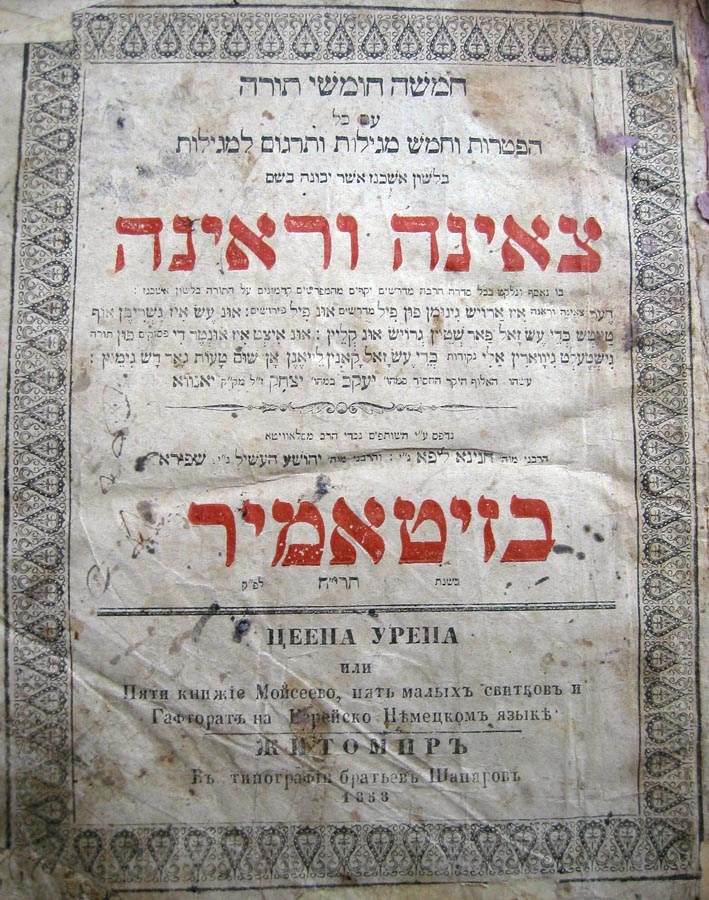
Title page of an 1853 edition.

The Tz'enah Ur'enah (Hebrew: צְאֶנָה וּרְאֶינָה Ṣʼenā urʼenā 'Go forth and see'; Yiddish pronunciation: [ˌʦɛnəˈʁɛnə]; Hebrew pronunciation: [ʦeˈʔena uʁˈʔena]), also spelt Tsene-rene and Tseno Ureno, sometimes called the Women's Bible, is a Yiddish-language prose work whose structure parallels the weekly Torah portions and Haftarahs used in Jewish prayer services. The book was written by Jacob ben Isaac Ashkenazi (1550–1625) of Janów Lubelski (near Lublin, Poland), and mixes Biblical passages with teachings from Judaism's Oral Torah such as the Talmud's Aggadah and Midrash, which are sometimes called "parables, allegories, short stories, anecdotes, legends, and admonitions" by secular writers.

The name derives from a verse of the Song of Songs that begins Ṣʼenā urʼenā bnoth Ṣiyyon (צְאֶינָה וּרְאֶינָה בְּנוֹת צִיּוֹן, "Go forth and see, O ye daughters of Zion", (Song 3:11)). The name indicates that the book was particularly directed at women, who would have been worse versed in Hebrew, although the title page markets it to men and women equally. The title page of the 1622 Hanau edition acknowledged among the book's sources various Talmudic texts and Biblical commentaries, including those of Rashi, Nachmanides, Hezekiah ben Manoah, Abraham Saba, Isaac Karo, and Bahya ben Asher.

Sol Liptzin describes the Tseno Ureno as "a fascinating, didactic book which could win the approbation of the strict moral leaders of Eastern European Jewry, and at the same time accompany women as their favorite literary and devotional text from girlhood to old age. For generations there was hardly a Yiddish home that did not possess a copy." Yisrael Meir Kagan wrote of earlier generations reading the book Tz'enah Ur'enah each Sabbath.

Because of its orientation toward women readers, the book is particularly focused on the biblical matriarchs, the various courtships mentioned in scripture, and the rescue of Moses by Pharaoh's daughter. Although there are vivid depictions of Paradise and Hell, there is an emphasis that righteousness is to be found in serving God willingly and wholeheartedly, rather than out of hope of reward or fear of punishment. Charity and almsgiving are also emphasized.

== Editions and translation ==
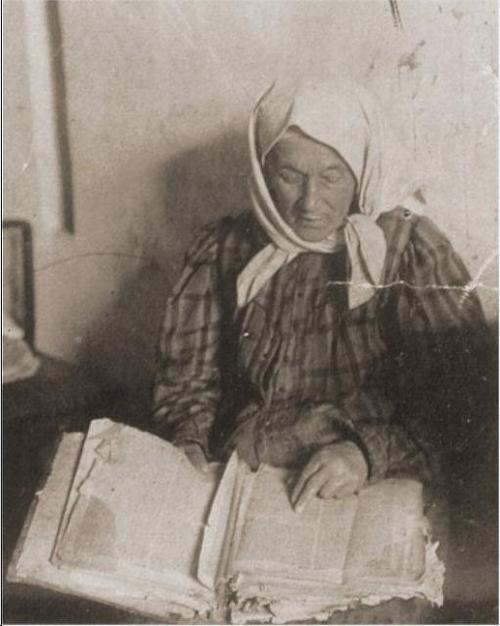
Jewish woman reading the Tseno Ureno in Vilnius, 1930.

There have been at least 300 editions of the book, starting in the 1590s. The oldest surviving edition dates to 1622, printed in Hanau. According to this edition, there were three previous editions - one printed in Lublin and two in Kraków - but they were already rare, and no copy of any of them has survived.

The format and contents of the book varied with the edition. The 1622 edition was published as two volumes, while later editions were mostly single volumes. Other modifications to later publications included illumination, the addition of Biblical apocryphal texts, and updating the text itself to reflect changes to the language of publication over time.

Parts of the Tseno Ureno were translated into German in 1910 by Bertha Pappenheim as Zennah u-Reenah. Only the first part of her translation of the Women's Bible appeared (Bereschit, corresponding to the Book of Genesis). The translations of the second and third books (Schemot and Wajikra) have apparently been lost.

The book continues in print today, especially for Hasidic communities.

ArtScroll published a two-volume English translation in 1993 (ISBN 0899069258), under the title The Weekly Midrash: Tz'enah Ur'enah the Classic Anthology of Torah Lore and Midrashic Commentary. In 2017, Morris M. Faierstein published a first critical translation into English, based on the 1622 edition.

== See also ==
- Bible translations into German
- Yiddish
- Yiddish literature
