= Heimann Joseph Michael =

German Jewish bibliographer (1792–1846)

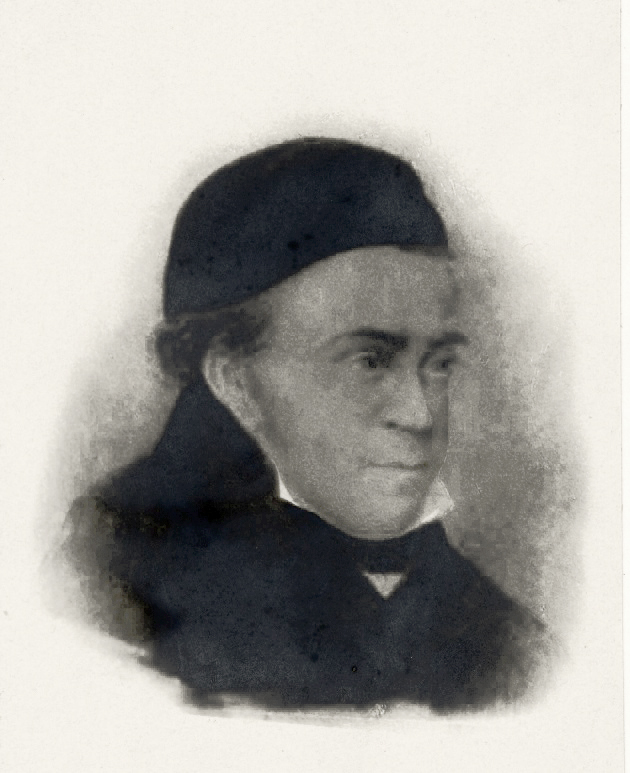
Heimann Joseph Michael

Heimann (Hayyim) Michael (April 12, 1792 – June 10, 1846) was a Hebrew bibliographer born at Hamburg. He showed great acuteness of mind in early childhood, had a phenomenal memory, and was an indefatigable student. He studied Talmudics and received private instruction in all the branches of a regular school education. He was a born bibliophile, and began to collect valuable works when still a boy of twelve. With his progress in Hebrew literature his love for books increased also, the result of which was his magnificent library of 862 manuscripts and 5,471 printed works, covering all branches of Hebrew literature. There were few books in his collection which he had not read, and he undertook the preparation of a full catalog of it. As far as he accomplished this task, it was the foundation of the Ozerot Hayyim, Katalog der Michael'schen Bibliothek, Hamburg, 1848.

Michael took an interest not only in Jewish literature, but in all the intellectual movements of the day, as is shown by the large number of contemporary books and leaflets found in his library. He never wrote directly for publication, but many scholars applied to him for information, and this he never withheld. His correspondence with Leopold Dukes, Franz Delitzsch, Wolf Heidenheim, J.L. Rapoport, Luzzatto, Gesenius, Lebrecht, Akiba Eiger, and Leopold Zunz is of great literary interest. Michael's only independent work was Or ha-Ḥayyim (Frankfort-on-the-Main, 1891), a comprehensive bibliographical and literary-historical dictionary of rabbinical literature, edited by his son, with preface by A. Berliner.
