= Isaac ben Jacob Benjacob =

Lithuanian bibliographer, author and publisher (1801–1863)

Isaac ben Jacob Benjacob (10 January 1801, Ramygala – 2 July 1863, Vilnius) was a Lithuanian Jewish maskil, best known as a bibliographer, author, and publisher. His 17-volume Hebrew Bible included Rashi, Moses Mendelssohn, as well as his own Mikraei Kodesh, which "emended" the biblical text and helped spread the Haskalah movement.

== Biography and works ==
Before he learned Russian, his parents moved to Vilnius, "and there he received instruction in Hebrew grammar and rabbinical lore".

Benjacob began to write early and composed short poems and epigrams in pure Biblical Hebrew that are among the best of their kind in Neo-Hebraic literature. For several years he lived in Riga, where he was engaged in business, but always studying and writing in his leisure hours. Later he became a publisher and bookseller and went to Leipzig, where he published his first work, Miktamim ve-Shirim "Epigrams and Songs", which also contains an important essay on epigrammatic composition (Leipzig, 1842). Of the other works he published there, his corrected edition of Bahya ibn Paquda's Chovot HaLevavot, with an introduction, a short commentary and a biography of the author, together with notes and fragments of Joseph Qimhi's translation by Adolf Ahron Jellinek, is the most valuable (Leipzig, 1846; Königsberg, 1859, without the introduction).

In 1848, Benjacob returned to Vilnius, and for the next five years, he and the poet Avraham Dov Ber Lebensohn were engaged in the publication of the Bible with a German language translation (in Hebrew type) and the new Biurim (Vilnius, 1848–1853, 17 vols.), which did much good as a means of spreading the knowledge of German and a proper understanding of the Hebrew text among the Jews in Russia. When this work was done, he brought out his corrected and amended edition of Chaim Yosef David Azulai's Shem ha-Gedolim (Vilnius, 1853; Vienna, 1862), which is still the standard edition of that important work. In 1862, Benjacob announced his intention to begin the publication of popular editions of classical Hebrew works which had become rare or high-priced. He died soon after the appearance of the first volume of Azariah dei Rossi's Meor 'Enayim, with which he started the series (Vilnius, 1863).

== Communal activities ==
In his later years, Benjacob was one of the leaders and representatives of the Jewish community of Vilnius and took an active part in all communal affairs. In his correspondence with Isaac Baer Levinsohn, which is partly published in HaKerem (pp. 41–62, Warsaw, 1888), Benjacob throws much light on the condition of the community at the beginning of the second half of the 19th century, and especially on the lamentable condition of the Rabbiner Schule (Rabbinical Seminary) which the government established there and in Jitomir in 1848 and closed in 1873.

Benjacob was originally intended to be one of the teachers of the Vilnius Seminary but never filled the position, and later he became one of the severest critics of that institution. These letters are also interesting on account of the idea they give of the perplexities of the old Maskilim of the Mendelssohnian school in Russia, such as Benjacob, who were being swept aside by the younger generation, which had the advantage of Russian training. He could not speak Russian and most of the representatives of the community also could not, excepting a few merchants who cared little for the fate of the seminary. The older members were at a great disadvantage when pitted against the young students, who could gain whatever they desired from the authorities on account of their correct Russian accent.

Benjacob corresponded with Jewish scholars in Western countries and was known during his lifetime for his great achievements as a bibliographer, although his monumental works, the Otzar ha-Sefarim, Thesaurus Librorum Hebræorum tam Impressorum quam Manuscriptorum, did not appear until seventeen years after his death (Vilnius, 1880). It was published by his son Jacob, and it contains 17,000 entries of Hebrew printed and manuscript works, with valuable notes by Moritz Steinschneider. An author-index to the work together with additions was promised (as of 1906) by Steinschneider (Hebr. Bibl. xx. 73; Festschrift, p. vii.). It is the greatest Jewish bibliographical work in the Hebrew language and is still the standard bibliography of printed books down to 1863.

Besides other minor works and articles published in various Hebrew periodicals and collections, Benjacob also commenced a German-Hebrew dictionary and a Mishnaic-Talmudic dictionary with a German translation, both of which were left unfinished.

== Jewish Encyclopedia bibliography ==
- Julius Fürst, Bibl. Jud. i.103-104 (see also vol. iii, Preface, p. vii);
- Nehemiah Brüll's Jahrbücher, v.217;
- Monatsschrift, xxx.375-384, 570-572;
- Kerem Ḥemed, v.8;
- Samuel Joseph Fuenn, Keneset Yisrael, pp. 597–599;
- Ha-Maggid, vii.234;
- Ha-Karmel, iii.365, 366.
