= Weekly Torah portion =

Portion of the Torah read during Jewish prayer

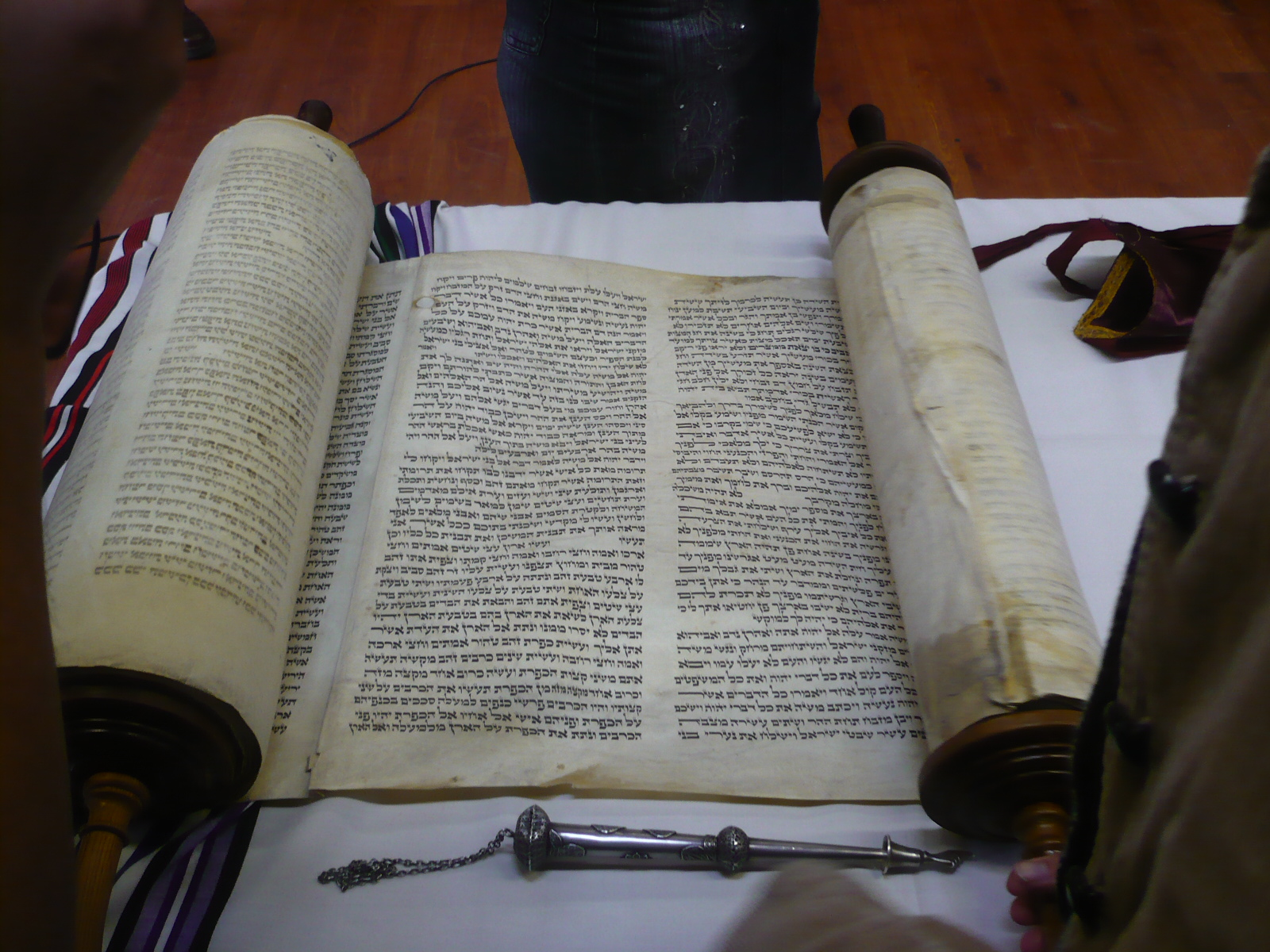
A Torah scroll and silver pointer (yad) used in reading.

The weekly Torah portion refers to a lectionary custom in Judaism in which a portion of the Torah (or Pentateuch) is read during Jewish prayer services on Monday, Thursday, and Saturday. The full name, Parashat HaShavua (Hebrew: פָּרָשַׁת הַשָּׁבוּעַ), is popularly abbreviated to parashah (also parshah /pɑːrʃə/ or parsha), and is also known as a Sidra or Sedra /sɛdrə/. The parashah is a section of the Torah used in Jewish liturgy during a particular week. There are 54 parshas, or parashiyot in Hebrew, and the full cycle is read over the course of one Biblical year.

== Content and number ==
Each Torah portion consists of two to six chapters to be read during the week. There are 54 weekly portions or parashot. Torah reading mostly follows an annual cycle beginning and ending on the Jewish holiday of Simchat Torah, with the divisions corresponding to the lunisolar Hebrew calendar, which contains up to 55 weeks, the exact number varying between leap years and regular years.

There are some deviations to the cyclic regularity noted above, all related to the week of Passover and the week of Sukkot. For both holidays, the first day of the holiday may fall on a Sabbath, in which case the Torah reading consists of a special portion relevant to the holiday rather than a portion in the normal cyclical sequence. When either holiday does not begin on a Sabbath, yet a different 'out of cycle' portion is read on the Sabbath within the holiday week.

Immediately following Sukkot is the holiday of Shemini Atzeret. In Israel, this holiday coincides with Simchat Torah; in the Jewish Diaspora, Simchat Torah is celebrated on the day following Shemini Atzeret. If Shemini Atzeret falls on a Sabbath, in the Diaspora a special 'out of cycle' Torah reading is inserted for that day. The final parashah, V'Zot HaBerachah, is always read on Simchat Torah.

Apart from this "immovable" final portion, there can be up to 53 weeks available for the other 53 portions. In years with fewer than 53 available weeks, some readings are combined to fit into the needed number of weekly readings.

The annual completion of the Torah readings on Simchat Torah, translating to "Rejoicing of the Torah", is marked by Jewish communities around the world.

== Name ==
Each weekly Torah portion takes its name from the first distinctive word or two in the Hebrew text of the portion in question, often from the first verse.

Examples
Parshah name	Passage	Name origin
Bereishit (בְּרֵאשִׁ֖ית)	Genesis 1:1-6:8	First word of the passage
Noach (נֹ֔חַ)	Genesis 6.9-11.32	Noach (Noah), the central figure of the passage
Lech Lecha (לֶךְ־לְךָ֛)	Genesis 12:1-17:27	Lech lecha means "go forth," a key phrase in the first line: "[God] said to Abram, 'Go forth from your native land...'"

== Practice ==
The appropriate parashah is chanted publicly. In most communities, it is read by a designated reader (ba'al koreh) in Jewish prayer services, starting with a partial reading on the afternoon of Shabbat, the Jewish Sabbath, i.e. Saturday afternoon, again during the Monday and Thursday morning services, and ending with a full reading during the following Shabbat morning services (Saturday morning). The weekly reading is pre-empted by a special reading on major religious holidays. Each Saturday morning and holiday reading is followed by an often similarly themed reading (Haftarah) from the Book of Prophets (Nevi'im).

== Origin ==
The custom of dividing the Torah readings dates to the time of the Babylonian captivity (6th century BCE). The origin of the first public Torah readings is found in the Book of Nehemiah, where Ezra the scribe writes about wanting to find a way to ensure the Israelites would not go astray again. This led to the creation of a weekly system to read the portions of the Torah at synagogues.

=== Alternative triennial cycle ===
In ancient times some Jewish communities practiced a triennial cycle of readings. In the 19th and 20th centuries, many congregations in the Reform and Conservative Jewish movements implemented an alternative triennial cycle in which only one-third of each weekly parashah was read in a given year; and this pattern continues. The parashot read are still consistent with the annual cycle, but the entire Torah is completed over three years. Orthodox Judaism does not follow this practice.

=== Differences between Israel and the diaspora ===
Due to different lengths of holidays in Israel and the Diaspora, the portion that is read on a particular week will sometimes not be the same inside and outside Israel. This only occurs when a Diaspora holiday—which are one day longer than those in Israel—extends into Shabbat.

== Differences between communities ==
While the Parshyot divisions are fairly standardized, there are various communities with differing parsha divisions. For example, many Yemenites combine Korach with the first half of Chukat and the second half of Chukat ("Vayis'u mi-kadesh") with Balak instead of combining Matot and Masei, and some Syrian communities combine Korach and Chukat instead of Matot and Masei. In Provence and Tunisia, Mishpatim and Im Kesef Talveh were occasionally divided so that Matot and Masei would always be read together.

== Table of weekly readings ==
In the table, a portion that may be combined with the following portion to compensate for the changing number of weeks in the lunisolar year, is marked with an asterisk. The following chart will show the weekly readings.

Book	Parsha name	English equivalent	Parsha Portion
Bereshit (Genesis): 12	Bereshit, בְּרֵאשִׁית	In the Beginning	Gen. 1:1-6:8
Bereshit (Genesis): 12	Noach, נֹחַ	Noah	6:9-11:32
Bereshit (Genesis): 12	Lech-Lecha, לֶךְ־לְךָ	Go Forth!	12:1-17:27
Bereshit (Genesis): 12	Vayeira, וַיֵּרָא	And He Appeared	18:1-22:24
Bereshit (Genesis): 12	Chayei Sarah, חַיֵּי שָׂרָה	The Life of Sarah	23:1-25:18
Bereshit (Genesis): 12	Toledot, תּוֹלְדֹת	Generations	25:19-28:9
Bereshit (Genesis): 12	Vayetze, וַיֵּצֵא	And He Went Out	28:10-32:3
Bereshit (Genesis): 12	Vayishlach, וַיִּשְׁלַח	And He Sent Out	32:4-36:43
Bereshit (Genesis): 12	Vayeshev, וַיֵּשֶׁב	And He Settled	37:1-40:23
Bereshit (Genesis): 12	Miketz, מִקֵּץ	At the End	41:1-44:17
Bereshit (Genesis): 12	Vayigash, וַיִּגַּשׁ	And He Approached	44:18-47:27
Bereshit (Genesis): 12	Vaychi, וַיְחִי	And He Lived	47:28-50:26
Shemot (Exodus): 11	Shemot, שְׁמוֹת	Names	Ex. 1:1-6:1
Shemot (Exodus): 11	Va'eira, וָאֵרָא	And I Appeared	6:2-9:35
Shemot (Exodus): 11	Bo, בֹּא	Come!	10:1-13:16
Shemot (Exodus): 11	Beshalach, בְּשַׁלַּח	When He Sent Out	13:17-17:16
Shemot (Exodus): 11	Yitro, יִתְרוֹ	Jethro	18:1-20:22
Shemot (Exodus): 11	Mishpatim, מִּשְׁפָּטִים	Laws	21:1-24:18
Shemot (Exodus): 11	Terumah, תְּרוּמָה	Donation	25:1-27:19
Shemot (Exodus): 11	Tetzaveh, תְּצַוֶּה	You Shall Command	27:20-30:10
Shemot (Exodus): 11	Ki Tissa, כִּי תִשָּׂא	When You Count	30:11-34:35
Shemot (Exodus): 11	*Vayakhel, וַיַּקְהֵל	And He Assembled	35:1-38:20
Shemot (Exodus): 11	Pekudei, פְקוּדֵי	Accountings	38:21-40:38
Vayikra (Leviticus): 10	Vayikra, וַיִּקְרָא	And He Called	Lev. 1:1-5:26
Vayikra (Leviticus): 10	Tzav, צַו	Command!	6:1-8:36
Vayikra (Leviticus): 10	Shemini, שְּׁמִינִי	Eighth	9:1-11:47
Vayikra (Leviticus): 10	*Tazria, תַזְרִיעַ	She Bears Seed	12:1-13:59
Vayikra (Leviticus): 10	Metzora, מְּצֹרָע	Leprous	14:1-15:33
Vayikra (Leviticus): 10	*Acharei Mot, אַחֲרֵי מוֹת	After the Death	16:1-18:30
Vayikra (Leviticus): 10	Kedoshim, קְדֹשִׁים	Holy Ones	19:1-20:27
Vayikra (Leviticus): 10	Emor, אֱמֹר	Speak!	21:1-24:23
Vayikra (Leviticus): 10	*Behar, בְּהַר	On the Mount	25:1-26:2
Vayikra (Leviticus): 10	Bechukotai, בְּחֻקֹּתַי	In My Statutes	26:3-27:34
Bemidbar (Numbers): 10	Bamidbar, בְּמִדְבַּר	In the Wilderness	Num. 1:1-4:20
Bemidbar (Numbers): 10	Naso, נָשֹׂא	Count!	4:21-7:89
Bemidbar (Numbers): 10	Behaalotecha, בְּהַעֲלֹתְךָ	When You Raise	8:1-12:16
Bemidbar (Numbers): 10	Shlach, שְׁלַח־לְךָ	Send Out!	13:1-15:41
Bemidbar (Numbers): 10	Korach, קֹרַח	Korach	16:1-18:32
Bemidbar (Numbers): 10	*Chukat, חֻקַּת	Statute	19:1-22:1
Bemidbar (Numbers): 10	Balak, בָּלָק	Balak	22:2-25:9
Bemidbar (Numbers): 10	Pinchas, פִּינְחָס	Phineas	25:10-30:1
Bemidbar (Numbers): 10	*Matot, מַּטּוֹת	Tribes	30:2-32:42
Bemidbar (Numbers): 10	Masei, מַסְעֵי	Journeys	33:1-36:13
Devarim (Deuteronomy): 11	Devarim, דְּבָרִים	Words	Deut. 1:1-3:22
Devarim (Deuteronomy): 11	Va'etchanan, וָאֶתְחַנַּן	And I Pleaded	3:23-7:11
Devarim (Deuteronomy): 11	Eikev, עֵקֶב	As a Consequence	7:12-11:25
Devarim (Deuteronomy): 11	Re'eh, רְאֵה	See!	11:26-16:17
Devarim (Deuteronomy): 11	Shoftim, שֹׁפְטִים	Judges	16:18-21:9
Devarim (Deuteronomy): 11	Ki Teitzei, כִּי־תֵצֵא	When You Go Out	21:10-25:19
Devarim (Deuteronomy): 11	Ki Tavo, כִּי־תָבוֹא	When You Come In	26:1-29:8
Devarim (Deuteronomy): 11	*Nitzavim, נִצָּבִים	Standing	29:9-30:20
Devarim (Deuteronomy): 11	Vayelech, וַיֵּלֶךְ	And He Went	31:1-31:30
Devarim (Deuteronomy): 11	Haazinu, הַאֲזִינוּ	Listen!	32:1-32:52
Devarim (Deuteronomy): 11	V'Zot HaBerachah, וְזֹאת הַבְּרָכָה	And This Is the Blessing	33:1-34:12

== See also ==
- Chumash
- Haftarah
- Hebrew cantillation
- Lectionary
- Sefer Torah
- Shnayim mikra ve-echad targum
- Tanakh
- Tikkun (book)
- Weekly Maqam
