= Joseph ibn Plat =

Joseph ibn Plat was a Rabbinical authority of the twelfth century CE. He is presumed to have been born in southern Spain, whence he went to Provence and settled in Lunel, though Epstein is of opinion that he was born in the Byzantine Empire. If this is so, he may be identical with the Joseph whom Benjamin of Tudela met in Damascus ("Itinerary," ed. Asher, i. 48). He also spent some time in Rome, Italy, and may have traveled in France, Lorraine, Lombardy, and Spain. According to Joseph ibn Tzaddik, he was flourishing in the year 1205; according to Abraham ben Solomon of Torrutiel, he died in 1225; but according to others he died before 1198. Abraham ben David, Asher ben Meshullam, and Zerahiah ha-Levi Gerondi, all of Lunel, received oral instruction from him, and he corresponded with Zerahiah and Abraham ben David in Posquières; in addition, he corresponded with Maimonides and Abraham ben Isaac of Narbonne. He wrote a treatise on the prayers entitled Tikkun Soferim, of which a fragment is extant. His halakic treatises, commentaries on various Talmudic books, such as Nedarim and Hullin, are quoted in the Ittur (ii. 18c), the Kol Bo (No. 106), and Shittah Mequbbetzet to Nedarim (fol. 7d), and extracts are to be found in the Pardes; his name, however, is cited in the last-named only in one long citation on the Benedictions (ed. Constantinople, fewl. 39b-41c).

== Resources ==
- Kayserling, Meyer and Richard Gottheil. "Joseph ibn Plat". Jewish Encyclopedia. Funk and Wagnalls, 1901–1906, which cites the following bibliography:

- Joseph ibn Tzaddik, Chronicles, ed. Neubauer, p. 94;
- David Conforte, Ḳore ha-Dorot, p. 8b;
- Zunz, Ritus, p. 26;

- idem, in Geiger's Wiss. Zeit. Jüd. Theol. ii. 308, 312;

- Solomon ben Adret, Response, No. 18;
- Kol Bo, Nos. 5, 8, 106;
- Benjamin Hirsch Auerbach, Sefer ha-Eshkol, Introduction, pp. x. et seq.;
- Heinrich Grätz, Gesch. vi. 287;
- Gross, Gallia Judaica, pp. 284 et seq.;
- A. Epstein, in Monatsschrift, xli. 475, xliv. 290.

Article written by Meyer Kayserling & Richard Gottheil.
