= Jonathan ben David ha-Cohen =

12th-century French commentator on the Talmud

Rabbi Jonathan ben David ha-Kohen of Lunel (Hebrew: יהונתן בן דוד הכהן מלוניל; c. 1135 – after 1210) was a leading French tosafist who took part in the Aliyah of the Tosafists.

He was also known as Jonathan of Lunel, and was one of several Jewish scholars associated with the town, including Meshullam ben Jacob of Lunel, Rabbi Abraham ben David (the "RABaD") who taught in Lunel before moving to Posquières, and Asher ben Meshullam of Lunel, the author of several rabbinical works.

Jonathan defended Maimonides against the severe attacks of Abraham ben David of Posquières (RABaD), and at Jonathan's instance Maimonides sent to Lunel his Moreh Nebukim, which Samuel ibn Tibbon translated into Hebrew. Jonathan is the author of a commentary on a work by Alfasi. About 1210, shortly before his departure for Palestine, where he went to with Tobiah ben Simson and Samuel ben Simson, he corresponded with Isaac ben Abraham of Dampierre, who had sent him a Talmudic responsum on a subject concerning the Holy Land.

== See also ==
- Hachmei Provence
