= Abraham ben Isaac of Narbonne =

12th-century Provençal rabbi

Abraham ben Isaac of Narbonne (Hebrew: ר׳ אַבְרָהָם בֶּן יִצְחָק מִנַרְבּוֹנָה)(c. 1080-85 – 1158) was a Provençal rabbi, also known as Raavad II, and author of the halachic work Ha-Eshkol (The Cluster).

== Biography ==
His teacher was Moses ben Joseph ben Merwan ha-Levi, during whose lifetime Abraham was appointed president (Av Beth Din) of the nine-member rabbinical board of Narbonne, and was made principal of the rabbinical academy. Talmudists he taught there included Abraham ben David III (who afterward became his son-in-law) and Zerahiah ha-Levi. Abraham ben Isaac died at Narbonne in 1158.

== Writings ==
Like most of the Provençal scholars, Raavad II was a diligent author, composing numerous commentaries upon the Talmud, all of which, however, have been lost with the exception of that upon the treatise Baba Batra, of which a manuscript has been preserved in Munich. Numerous quotations from these commentaries are to be found in the writings of Zerahiah Gerondi, Nahmanides, Nissim Gerondi, and others. Many of his explanations of Talmudical passages are also repeated in his responsa which give his method of treatment. In Abraham's comments on the Talmud he seems to have taken Rashi as his model; for they are marked by the same precision and clearness of exposition.

An idea of his Talmudic knowledge may be gathered from his book Ha-Eshkol. Benjamin Hirsch Auerbach published an 1867 edition of the Eshkol in three volumes with commentary which is now known to be a forgery. Most scholars assume it is an intentional forgery by Auerbach. (HaNigleh SheBaNistar pg. 144 n. 203). However, Auerbach's edition is known to contain a wide variety of much later material. Shalom and Hanoch Albeck published a separate edition from genuine manuscripts in 1935-1938. Albeck writes that the book is, in practice, mostly a redaction of the Sefer haIttim of Judah ben Barzillai. In 1985 a "fourth volume" of Auerbach's edition was published by Bernard Bergman, who had defended Auerbach's edition in a 1974 essay that makes clear that he did not then have access to any manuscript of either the Eshkol or Auerbach's commentary thereon. The fourth volume cites a book which had not yet been published at the time of Auerbach's death. Bergman, who was convicted of Medicaid fraud in 1976, never explained where he obtained the material for this "fourth volume."

His depth and acumen, however, are shown to much better advantage in his responsa, quoted in the collection Temim De'im and in the Sefer ha-Terumot of Samuel Sardi. Other responsa sent to Joseph ben Ḥen (Graziano) of Barcelona and Meshullam ben Jacob of Lunel are found in a manuscript belonging to Baron de Günzburg in Saint Petersburg. A collection of Raavad II's responsa preserved in Yemen, the only manuscript of its kind, was published by R. Yosef Qafih in 1962. As an acknowledged rabbinical authority and president of the rabbinical board, he was frequently called upon to give his decision on difficult questions: and his answers show that he was not only a lucid exegete, but also a logical thinker.

== Impact ==
Though he lacked originality, Abraham's influence upon Talmudical study in Provence ought not to be underrated. Languedoc formed politically a connecting link between Spain and northern France; in like manner Jewish scholars played the rôle of intermediaries between the Jews of these countries. Abraham ben Isaac represented this function; he was the intermediary between the dialectics employed by the tosafists of France and the systematic science of the Spanish rabbis. The French-Italian codifiers – Aaron ha-Kohen of Lunel, Zedekiah ben Abraham, and many others – took Abraham's Ha-Eshkol for their model; and it was not until the appearance of the Tur (by Jacob ben Asher) that Ha-Eshkol lost its importance and sank into comparative oblivion. The school founded by Abraham ben Isaac, as exemplified in RABaD III and Zerahiah ha-Levi, was nevertheless the creator of a system of Talmudic criticism; and the method it employed was the tosafist dialectic modified and simplified by Spanish-Jewish logic.

== See also ==
- Hachmei Provence
