= Levite =

Jewish men descended patrilineally from the Tribe of Levi

Levites
לויים

Total population
- ~500,000–600,000 worldwide (Note: Levites comprise a subgroup of about 4% of world Jewry. Combined with Kohanim, who are also Levites, the subgroup forms roughly 8% of the Jewish population worldwide, or about 1–1.1 million. Levites also comprise one of the four surviving families of Samaritans, where they serve the role of High Priests due to the fact that the last Samaritan High Priest Cohanic family went extinct in the 17th century.)

Regions with significant populations
- Israel: 240,000
- United States: 200,000
- France: 16,000
- Canada: 12,000
- India: 3,000

Languages
- Vernacular: Hebrew, English and numerous other languages in the Jewish diaspora Historical: Biblical Hebrew, Aramaic

Religion
- Judaism, Samaritanism

Related ethnic groups
- other Jews, Samaritans
- Total percentage of Levites among Jews is about 4%.

Levites (/ˈliːvaɪt/ LEE-vyte; Hebrew: לְוִיִּם, romanized: Lǝvīyyīm) or Levi are Jewish males who claim patrilineal descent from the Tribe of Levi. The Tribe of Levi descended from Levi, the third son of Jacob and Leah. The surname Halevi, which consists of the Hebrew definite article "ה" Ha- ('the') plus Levi ('Levite'), is not conclusive regarding being a Levite; a titular use of HaLevi indicates being a Levite. The daughter of a Levite is a Bat Levi (Bat being Hebrew for 'daughter').

The Tribe of Levi served particular religious duties for the Israelites and had political (administering cities of refuge) and educational responsibilities as well. In return, the landed tribes were expected to support the Levites with a tithe (Numbers 18:21–25), particularly the tithe known as the First tithe, ma'aser rishon. The Kohanim, a subset of the Levites, were the priests, who performed the work of holiness in the Temple. The Levites, referring to those who were not Kohanim, were specifically assigned to:

- Singing and/or playing music in the Temple
- Serving as guards
- Carrying (Note: a Levite assigned to one area was punishable by death for encroaching on one of the other two areas. Kohathites who carried the holy items could not look at the ark or they died, since they were not descendants of Aaron Numbers 4.17–20)

When Joshua led the Israelites into the land of Canaan (Joshua 13:33), the Sons of Levi were the only Israelite tribe that received cities but were not allowed to be landowners "because the Lord the God of Israel Himself is their inheritance" (Deuteronomy 18:2).

In modern times, Levites are integrated in Jewish communities, but keep a distinct status. There are estimated 300,000 Levites among Ashkenazi Jewish communities, and a similar number among Sephardic and Mizrahi Jews combined. The total percentage of Levites among the wider Jewish population is about 4%.

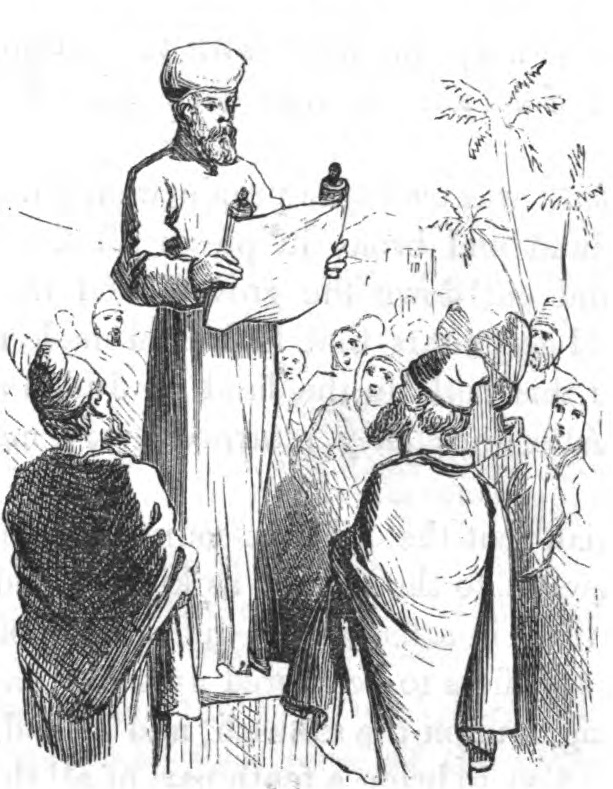
A Levite reads the Law to the people (1873 illustration).

Most scholars view the Torah as projecting the origins of the Levites into the past to explain their role as landless cultic functionaries.

== In contemporary Jewish practice ==
Today, Levites in Orthodox Judaism continue to have additional rights and obligations compared to lay people, although these responsibilities have diminished with the destruction of the Temple. For instance, Kohanim are eligible to be called to the Torah first, followed by the Levites. Levites also provide assistance to the Kohanim, particularly washing their hands, before the Kohanim recite the Priestly Blessing.

Since Levites (and Kohanim) are traditionally pledged to Divine service, there is no Pidyon HaBen (redemption of the firstborn) ceremony for:

- the son of a Kohen's or a Levite's daughter
- the son of a Kohen or a Levite.

Orthodox Judaism believes in the eventual rebuilding of a Temple in Jerusalem and a resumption of the Levitical role. A small number of schools, primarily in Israel, train priests and Levites in their respective roles. On November 28, 2025 Levites returned to sing on the Temple Mount.

Conservative Judaism—which believes in a restoration of the Temple as a house of worship and in some special role for Levites, although not the ancient sacrificial system as previously practised—recognizes Levites as having special status. Not all Conservative congregations call Kohanim and Levites to the first and second reading of the Torah, and many no longer perform rituals such as the Priestly Blessing and Pidyon HaBen in which Kohanim and Levites have a special role.

Reconstructionist and Reform Judaism do not observe distinctions between Kohanim, Levites, and other Jews.

=== Relationship with Kohanim ===
The Kohanim are traditionally believed and halachically required to be of direct patrilineal descent from the biblical Aaron of the Tribe of Levi. The origins of the name/term "Levy" in Hebrew remain unclear. Some hypotheses link this name with the Hebrew root lwh, the Aramaic root lwy, or the Arabic root lwy.

The noun kohen is used in the Torah to refer to priests, both Israelite and non-Israelite, such as the Israelite nation as a whole, as well as the priests (Hebrew kohanim) of Baal. During the existence of the Temple in Jerusalem, Kohanim performed the daily and holiday (Yom Tov) duties of sacrificial offerings.

Today kohanim retain a lesser though somewhat distinct status within Judaism, and are bound by additional restrictions according to Orthodox Judaism. During the Priestly Blessing, the Levites traditionally wash the hands of the Kohanim prior to the blessing of the House of Israel. ("A first-born son washes the Kohen's hands if there is no Levite".)

=== Bat Levi ===
In Orthodox Judaism, children of a Bat Levi, like those of a Bat-Kohen, regardless of the child's father's tribe or the mother's marital status, retain the traditional exemption for their children from the requirement of being redeemed through the Pidyon HaBen.

Conservative Judaism permits a Bat Levi to perform essentially all the rituals a male Levi would perform, including being called to the Torah for the Levite aliyah in those Conservative synagogues which have both retained traditional tribal roles and modified traditional gender roles. In Israel, Conservative/Masorti Judaism has not extended Torah honors either to a bat Kohen or to a bat Levi.

=== The Levites and the Holocaust ===
In 1938, with the outbreak of violence that would come to be known as Kristallnacht, American Orthodox rabbi Menachem HaKohen Risikoff wrote about the central role he saw for Priests and Levites in terms of Jewish and world responses, in worship, liturgy, and teshuva, repentance. In The Priests and the Levites (1940), he stressed that members of these groups exist in the realm between history (below) and redemption (above), and must act in a unique way to help move others to prayer and action, and help bring an end to suffering. He wrote, "Today, we also are living through a time of flood, Not of water, but of a bright fire, which burns and turns Jewish life into ruin. We are now drowning in a flood of blood. ... Through the Kohanim and Levi'im help will come to all Israel."

== Levite population ==
=== Levite Y-chromosome studies ===
A 2003 study of the Y-chromosome by Behar et al. pointed to multiple origins for Ashkenazi Levites, who comprise approximately 4% among the Ashkenazi Jews. It found that Haplogroup R1a1a (R-M17), uncommon in the Middle East or among Sephardic Jews, is present in over 50% of Ashkenazi Levites, while the rest of Ashkenazi Levites' paternal lineage is of certain Middle Eastern origin, including Y-chromosome haplogroups E3b, J2, F, R1b, K, I, Q, N and L. Haplogroup R1a1a is found at the highest levels among people of Eastern European descent, with 50 to 65% among Sorbs, Poles, Russians, and Ukrainians. In South Asia, R1a1a has often been observed with high frequency in a number of demographic groups, reaching over 70% in West Bengal Brahmins in India and among the Mohani people in Sindh, Pakistan. Behar's data suggested a founding event, involving an 'introgression' of anywhere from one to fifty non-Jewish European men, occurring at a time close to the initial formation and settlement of the Ashkenazi community as a possible explanation. As Nebel, Behar and Goldstein speculate:

although neither the NRY haplogroup composition of the majority of Ashkenazi Jews nor the microsatellite haplotype composition of the R1a1 haplogroup within Ashkenazi Levites is consistent with a major Khazar or other European origin, as has been speculated by some authors (Baron 1957; Dunlop 1967; Ben-Sasson 1976; Keys 1999), one cannot rule out the important contribution of a single or a few founders among contemporary Ashkenazi Levites."

A 2013 paper by Siiri Rootsi et al. confirmed a Near or Middle Eastern origin for all Ashkenazi Levites, including the R1a Y-chromosome carriers, and refuted the Khazar hypothesis of Ashkenazi ancestry:

Previous Y-chromosome studies have demonstrated that Ashkenazi Levites, members of a paternally inherited Jewish Levite caste, display a distinctive founder event within R1a, the most prevalent Y-chromosome haplogroup in Eastern Europe. Here we report the analysis of 16 whole R1 sequences and show that a set of 19 unique nucleotide substitutions defines the Ashkenazi R1a lineage. While our survey of one of these, M582, in 2,834 R1a samples reveals its absence in 922 Eastern Europeans, we show it is present in all sampled R1a Ashkenazi Levites, as well as in 33.8% of other R1a Ashkenazi Jewish males and 5.9% of 303 R1a Near Eastern males, where it shows considerably higher diversity. Moreover, the M582 lineage also occurs at low frequencies in non-Ashkenazi Jewish populations. In contrast to the previously suggested Eastern European origin for Ashkenazi Levites, the current data are indicative of a geographic source of the Levite founder lineage in the Near East and its likely presence among pre-Diaspora Hebrews.

In a later 2017 study Behar et al. revised their initially mitigated position, concluding that a "Middle Eastern origin of the Ashkenazi Levite lineage based on what was previously a relatively limited number of reported samples, can now be considered firmly validated", precising that a "rich variation of haplogroup R1a outside of Europe which is phylogenetically separate from the typically European R1a branches", referring to the R1a-Y2619 sub-clade.

=== Lineage ===
Having a last name of Levi or a related term does not necessarily mean a person is a Levite, and many well-known Levites do not have such last names.

Levitical status is passed down in families from father (Note: The child of a Bat Levi [daughter of a Levi] has no Levite status.) to child born from a Jewish mother, as part of a family's genealogical tradition. Tribal status of Levite is determined by patrilineal descent, so a child whose biological father is a Levite (in cases of adoption or artificial insemination, status is determined by the genetic father), is also considered a Levite. Jewish status is determined by matrilineal descent, thus conferring levitical status onto children requires both biological parents to be Israelites and the biological father to be a Levite.

Accordingly, there is currently no branch of Judaism that regards levitical status as conferrable by matrilineal descent. It is either conferrable patrilineally with a Jewish mother, in the traditional manner, or it does not exist and is not conferred at all.

=== Levite surnames ===
Some Levites have adopted a related last name to signify their status. Because of diverse geographical locations, the names have several variations:

- Alouwi – Arabic variant, of Sephardic origin
- Aguiló – surname to the Jews from Mallorca (Xuetes)
- Bazes – a Levite surname.
- Benveniste – a Sephardic Levite surname
- Epstein – one of the European lineages descended from Zerahiah Ha-Levi of Sepharad
- HaLevi, Halevi and Halevy – Hebrew, meaning 'the Levi' or 'the Levite'
- Horowitz HaLevi, or simply Horowitz/Hurwitz/Gurvich/Gurevich – a European Levite surname, tracing to Isaiah Horowitz HaLevi, a descendant of Zerahiah Ha-Levi of Sepharad
- Lavi – a common Levite surname
- Leefsma – Frisian surname
- Leevi – Finnish variation
- Lev – simplified Russian variation of Levi
- Levai, Lévai and Lévay – a Levitic surname, originally meaning "a person from Levice" but subsequently used by Jews who were forced to change their name during the Holocaust
- Leven – Swedish variation
- Levente – Hungarian variation
- Lévi, Levi, Lévy or Levy – Hebrew for "Levite", equally common in Ashkenasic and Sephardic groups
- Levian/Livian/Benlevi/Liviem – Persian-Jewish variations
- Lević, also Levinić, Prelević – Croatian or Serbian variations
- Levin – Russian variation, also Levine, Lavin or Lavine (/ləˈviːn/, rhyming with "ravine", or in some cases further anglicised to /lɪˈvaɪn/, rhyming with "divine") and Lewin a Polish variation. Sometimes supplemented with German "thal" (valley) to Levinthal or Leventhal and -sohn and -son to Levinson or Levinsohn as a patronymic, and with Slavic -ski and -sky suffixes Levinski, Levinsky, Lewinski and Lewinsky (the "e" often replaced with "a" in German areas).
- Levit, also Levitt – typically from the Bessarabia region of Romania, Moldova and southern Ukraine
- Levita – Elia Levita, an ancestor of David Cameron
- Levits – the surname in Latvia (adding the s for men or a for women), president of Latvia Egils Levits.
- Leviyev – the Russified surname (adding the yev/ev) that many Bukharian Jews of Central Asia have. Sometimes spelled Leviev or even Levaev.
- Lewi or Lewj (Polish, Levi and Levy)
- Lewicki – Polish "of the Levites", also Lewicka, Lewycka, Lewycki, Lewycky, Lewicky, Levicki, Levicky (can also originate from placenames in Poland)
- Lewita – Polish Levite or Levita Latinized, with Slavic suffix -an/in Lewitan, Levitan, Levitin, Lewitin, Lewitinn, and with additional suffix -ski/sky Levitanski, Lewitanski, Levitansky, also Lewitas, Levitas, Lithuanian, Belarusian, Leyva Spanish Sephardic, also but rare Lefite, Lafite, Lafitte, of French Sephardic origin.
- Variants from Yiddish Leyvik, a pet form of Leyvi: Levitch Ukrainian variant, also Levicz, Levis, Levitz, Lewicz, Lewitz, Lewis, and with -ski and -sky suffixes Leviczky, Levitski, Levitsky, Lewitski and Lewitsky ("e" and "s" often replaced with "a" and "z" in German areas)
- Loewy, Löwi, Löwy and Loewe German or Swiss variations (although the usual origin for these names is Löwe, the German word for "lion").
- Moss (Hebrew for Moses; descendant of Moses God's most important prophet according to the torah) also ancient Gaelic for Devotee, which Moses was a Levite devoted to his mission to free the Hebrew.
- Segal – shortened "Segen Levi" (secondary Levite)
- Urfali or Levi Urfali (also Levi Abud, Levi Aslan, Levi Hamami) – an Urfalim community surname, which was mostly Levite in origin
- Zemmel – shortened "Zecher mi-Shevet Levi" (descendant of the Levite tribe)

==== Modern Levites ====
The following are some Levites with non-Levite-like last names in modern times:

- Frank Gehry
- Chaim Herzog
- Norman Lear

== Notable Levites ==
- Levi
- Moses
- Aaron
- Samuel
- Caiaphas
- Yehoshua ben Levi
- Judah Halevi
- Aharon HaLevi
- Shlomo Halevi Alkabetz
- Maharsha
- Shlomo Wahrman
- Issachar Berend Lehmann
- Avraham Bromberg
- Max Letteris
- Joseph ibn Migash
- Zerahiah Ha-Levi
- Yechezkel Landau
- Yaakov ben Moshe Levi Moelin
- Luis de Torres
- Abraham Fraenkel
- Shmuel Wosner
- Meir Abulafia
- Samuel ibn Naghrillah
- Yehuda Ashlag
- Yitzchok Zev Soloveitchik
- Pinchas Horowitz
- Hillel Paritcher
- Yechezkel Levenstein
- Yisroel Belsky
- Baruch ha-Levi Epstein
- Chaim Herzog
- Yosef Dov Soloveitchik
- Chaim Soloveitchik
- Joseph B. Soloveitchik
- Mordechai Willig
- Moe Howard (Moses Harry Horwitz)
- Shemp Howard (Samuel Horwitz)
- Curly Howard (Jerome Lester Horwitz)

== See also ==
- Kohen
- Samaritans
- Urfalim
