= Aharon HaLevi =

Rabbi

Aharon ben Joseph haLevi (Hebrew: אהרון הלוי; c. 1235 – c. 1303), known by his Hebrew acronym Ra'AH (רא״ה), was a medieval rabbi, Talmudic scholar and Halakhist.

Aharon haLevi was born in Girona, Catalonia (present-day Spain) in 1235 to his father Joseph haLevi, son of Benveniste haLevi, son of Rabbi Joseph haLevi, who was the son of Rabbi Zerachiah haLevi of Girona Baal Hamaor. Ra'AH's mother Clara was a granddaughter of Aaron of Lunel, who was the son of Meshullam ben Jacob of Lunel.

Aharon haLevi studied under his father Joseph haLevi and brother Pinchas ben Joseph haLevi, as well as Nachmanides, and was a colleague of Shlomo ben Aderet (1235–1310). He published critical notes on the Rashba's Torat HaBayit, which he entitled Bedeq HaBayit. He also wrote a commentary on the Talmud, select parts of which have been published.

Gedaliah ibn Yaḥyah suggested that haLevi might also be the anonymous "Levite of Barcelona" (Note: The editio princeps of the Hinukh (Venice, 1523) attributes it to "Rabbi Aaron", as do some later editions. Ibn Yahya apparently relied on this attribution, but scholars have not been able to discover its source. The manuscripts say only that the author was "A Jew of the House of Levi in Barcelona".) who wrote the Sefer haHinukh, but this theory has been rejected due to discrepancies between opinions expressed, and the authorities cited, in the Bedeq HaBayit and the Hinukh.

Yom Tov Asevilli was one of Aharon HaLevi's students.

== Works ==
- Bedeq haBayit (Sefaria)
- Commentaries to Berakhot (Sefaria), Sukkah, Beitzah, Taanit, Ḥullin, Ketubbot, and Avodah Zarah have been printed. The Novellae of Ra'AH to Qiddushin are not his. Some fragments of his Novellae to Pesaḥim survive in manuscript (link), and others are quoted by Joseph ben Saul Kimhi in Mezuqqaq Shiv'atayim f. 47v-48r.
