= Aaron ben Meshullam ben Jacob of Lunel =

Jewish scholar

Aaron ben Meshullam ben Jacob of Lunel was a French Jewish ritualist who flourished about the end of the twelfth century in Lunel and died in about 1210 (according to the "Scepter of Judah"). He was one of the five sons of Meshullam ben Jacob and seems to have written a book on Dinim, from which the author of the "Sefer Asufot" (MS. in the Montefiore College Library) quotes several passages. His decisions and interpretations are also referred to in the "Sefer ha-Hashlamah" of his nephew, Rabbi Meshullam, who calls him "ḥakam" for his general knowledge. He was an advocate for the spread of scientific literacy among the Jewish intelligentsia.

== Teachings and controversies ==
Judah ibn Tibbon, in his ethical will, recommends his son Samuel to seek in all things the advice of Rabbis Aaron and Asher, these being trusted friends; and he refers to Aaron's skill in computation of the calendar and in other branches of rabbinic knowledge. In the literary controversy about certain theories and decisions of Moses Maimonides, carried on at the time by the Maimonists and Anti-maimonists, Rabbi Aaron sided with the former.

Rabbi Meir ha-Levi Abulafia informed Rabbi Aaron of his criticisms on the works of Maimonides. The reply of R. Aaron, in defense of Maimonides, is distinguished by its elegance of style, its appropriate use of Biblical and Talmudic phrases, and its skill in literary criticism. After a long panegyric on the greatness of Maimonides, R. Aaron places him above ordinary criticism. He says that if R. Abulafia discovered in the works of Maimonides passages that appeared strange and unintelligible, he should have expressed his doubts in moderate terms, like a disciple who seeks information, and not like a master who corrects his pupil.
