= Bonastruc Desmaëstre =

Prominent citizen of Girona

Bonastruc Desmaëstre was a Spanish Jewish controversialist at the disputation of Tortosa 1413-14. Bonastruc was a prominent citizen in Girona, Catalonia.

When, under a penalty of 1,000 florins, he was summoned to appear with his fourteen-year-old son and his little granddaughter before the queen dowager of Aragon in order to defend himself against a charge brought against his family, the lawyers of the town interceded in his behalf (April 21, 1411) before the council of the queen dowager, seeking to excuse his absence, and saying that it would be impossible for him to obey the royal summons, since the hostility against the Jews rendered the journey dangerous (see Girbal, "Los Judios en Gerona," p. 35).

In February of the same year Bonastruc wrote to Zerahiah ha-Levi, called Don Ferrer Saladin, concerning a lawsuit which he was prosecuting, in consequence of the betrothal of his son Bonastruc with a young orphan already affianced to another ("Rev. Et. Juives," xv. 34). Whether the summons to the presence of the queen was in any way connected with the lawsuit, or whether the letter of Bonastruc to Zerahiah ha-Levi was wrongly dated, has not been determined.

On December 8, 1412, at the request of Pope Benedict XIII, Bishop Ramon de Castellar of Girona, through a notary, invited Bonastruc, Azday Todroç, Nissim Ferrer, Jafudà Alfaquim, and Bonastruc Jucef (the last-named not a physician) members of the Jewish community of Girona, in order to communicate to them the letter from the pope requesting the city to send four, or at least two, of its most learned men to the disputation at Tortosa, adding,

"et quia Bonastruch maestre eruditus in talibus asseritur, ipsum volumus inter ceteros principaliter transmittatis, ministrando eis expensas seu salaria in similibus assueta" (Girbal, ib. pp. 35, 83).

Hence Bonastruc, together with the rabbis Todros and Ferrer, was sent as a delegate from Girona. Bonastruc, who disputed with Geronimo de Santa Fé on Feb. 10, 11, and 15, on one occasion aroused the anger of the pope (who was present) to such an extent that his fellow-delegates became frightened, and on their return bitterly reproached him, saying: "We had not agreed among ourselves to speak as you have done." Bonastruc, together with the rabbis Todros and Ferrer, the delegates from Girona, conducted the dispute. The report sent as a circular letter to the community at Girona was probably not written by Bonastruc.
