= Hôtel de Ville, Lunel =

Town hall in Lunel, France

Hôtel de Ville
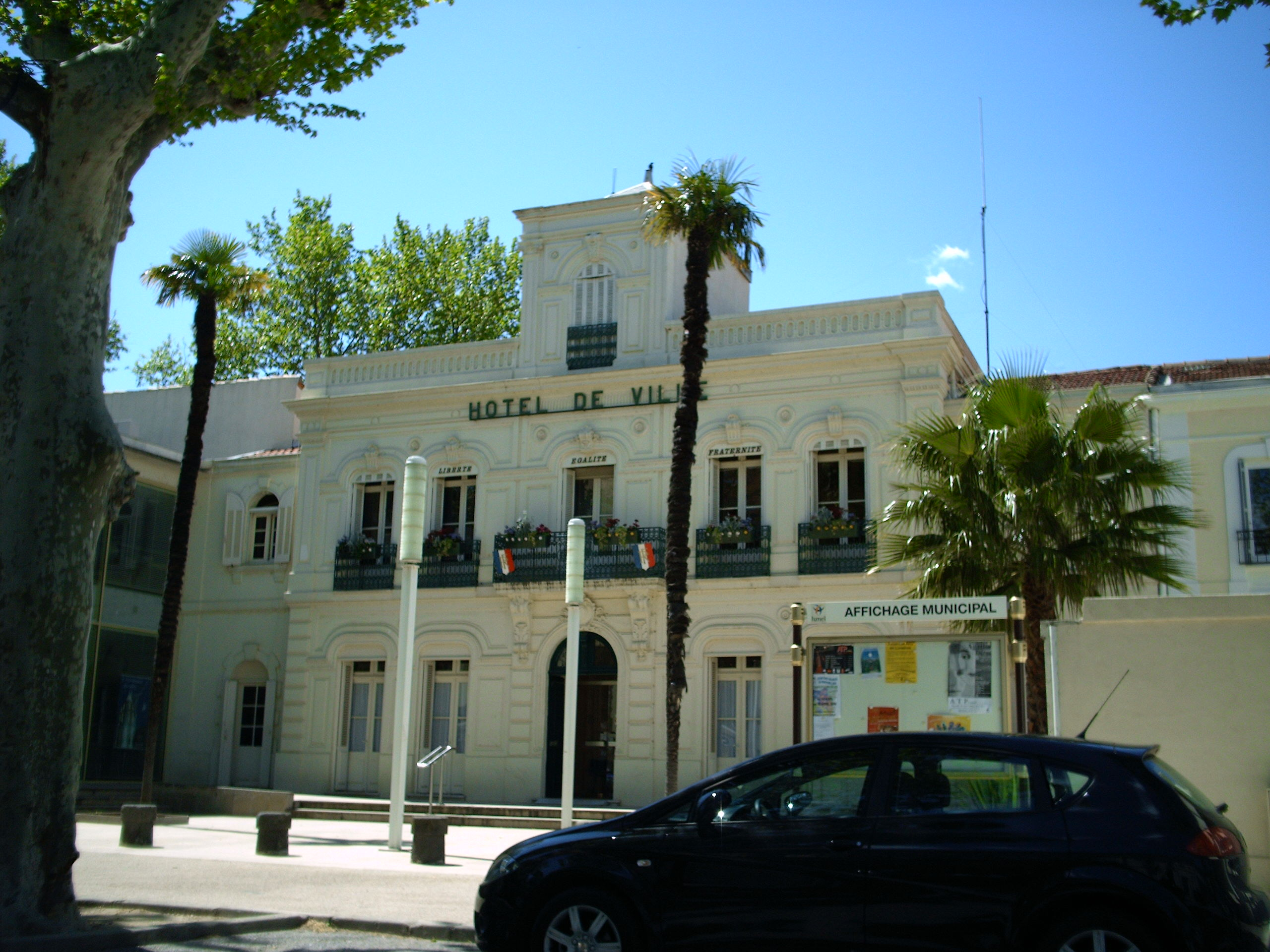
- The main frontage of the Hôtel de Ville in April 2008
- Interactive map of the Hôtel de Ville area

General information
- Type: City hall
- Architectural style: Italianate style
- Location: Lunel, France
- Coordinates: 43.6788°N 4.1323°E
- Completed: Remodelled c. 1950

The Hôtel de Ville (French pronunciation: [otɛl də vil], City Hall) is a municipal building in Lunel, Hérault, in southern France, standing on Avenue Victor Hugo.

== History ==
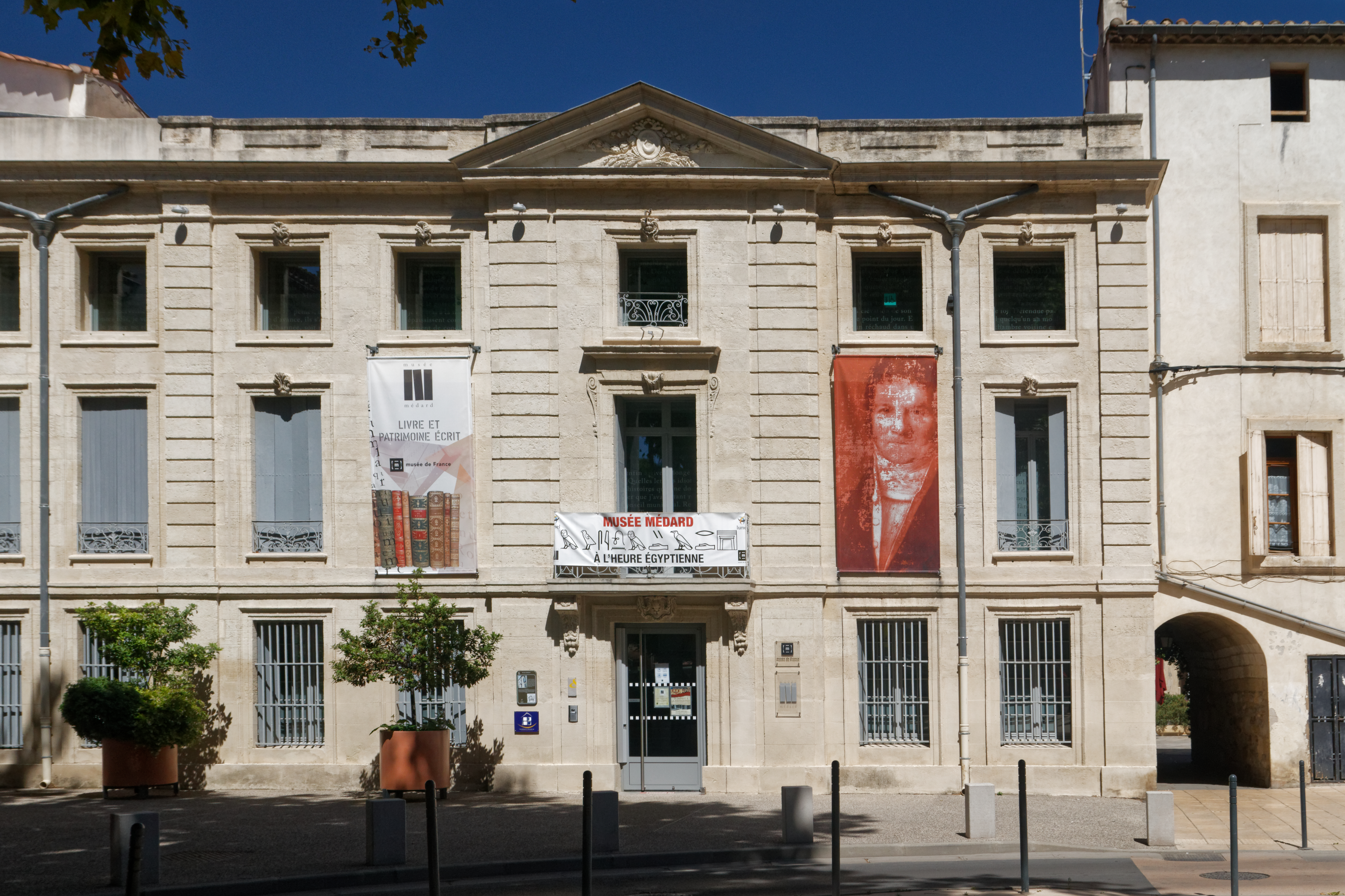
The old town hall

After the French Revolution the town council originally met in the house of the mayor of the time. This arrangement continued until the mid-19th century when the council acquired a private mansion, known as the Hôtel Paulet, in the northeast corner of what is now Place des Martyrs de la Résistance. It was designed in the neoclassical style, built in ashlar stone and had been completed in mid-18th century.

The design involved an asymmetrical main frontage of seven bays facing onto the square. The fifth bay on the left, which was slightly projected forward, featured a doorway with a moulded surround and a keystone on the ground floor, a French door with a stone surround and a balcony and on the first floor, and a square window with a stone surround on the second floor. The bay was flanked by banded pilasters supporting an entablature and a pediment with a carving in the tympanum. The other bays were fenestrated by casement windows with stone surrounds on the first two floors and by square windows with stone surrounds on the second floor. There was a cornice and a parapet at roof level.

A statue depicting Captain Marie Charles François Joseph Ménard, who died in action in February 1892 during the Second Mandingo War, was created by the sculptor, Auguste Maillard, and installed in front of the town hall in October 1897. Following the liberation of the town on 29 August 1944, during the Second World War, the president of the local liberation committee, Ernest Périer, appeared on the balcony of the town hall and waved to the crowd. After the building was no longer required for municipal use, it served as a public library and, in 2013, became the Musée Médard commemorating the life of the merchant, Louis Médard, who left his collection of 5,000 books and manuscripts to the town when he died in July 1841.

After the war, following significant population growth, the council decided to acquire and remodel a more substantial building for use as their town hall. The site they selected was occupied by a fine townhouse on Avenue Victor Hugo. The building had been designed in the Italianate style, built in ashlar stone and was probably completed in the 19th century. The design involved a symmetrical main frontage of seven bays facing onto the street, with the outer bays slightly recessed. The central bay featured a round headed doorway with a moulded surround and a keystone on the ground floor, a French door with a moulded surround and a hood mould on the first floor, and a square tower with a round-headed window and a pyramid-shaped roof above. The other bays were fenestrated by segmental headed windows with hood moulds on both floors. The building was remodelled to create municipal offices and a new Salle du Conseil (council chamber).
