= Abraham ben David =

Provençal rabbi and Talmud commentator (c.1125–1198)

Abraham ben David (c. 1125 – 27 November 1198), also known as Abraham ben David of Posquières and by the abbreviations RABaD (for Rabbeinu Abraham ben David), Ravad or RABaD III, was a wealthy Provençal ḥakham and French Jewish Talmudist, noted as an important commentator on the Talmud, the Sefer Halachot of Isaac Alfasi and the Mishneh Torah of Maimonides. He is also regarded as a father of Kabbalah and as one of the principal links in the chain of Jewish mystics.

A man of considerable wealth, Abraham founded a yeshiva in Posquières, where scholars such as Meir ben Isaac and Abraham's own son, Isaac the Blind, were educated. Nachmanides remarked upon his piety and erudition. His reputation was particularly established by his criticism of Maimonides' Mishneh Torah, which he faulted especially for failing to provide sources or explanations and for its very tendency to codify the law. He also wrote commentaries on the Mishnah and Talmud, as well as hassagot, or critical glosses, on the works of several contemporary scholars.

His best-known work was Baʿalei ha-Nefesh ("Masters of the Soul"), which discusses laws relating to women.

== Biography ==
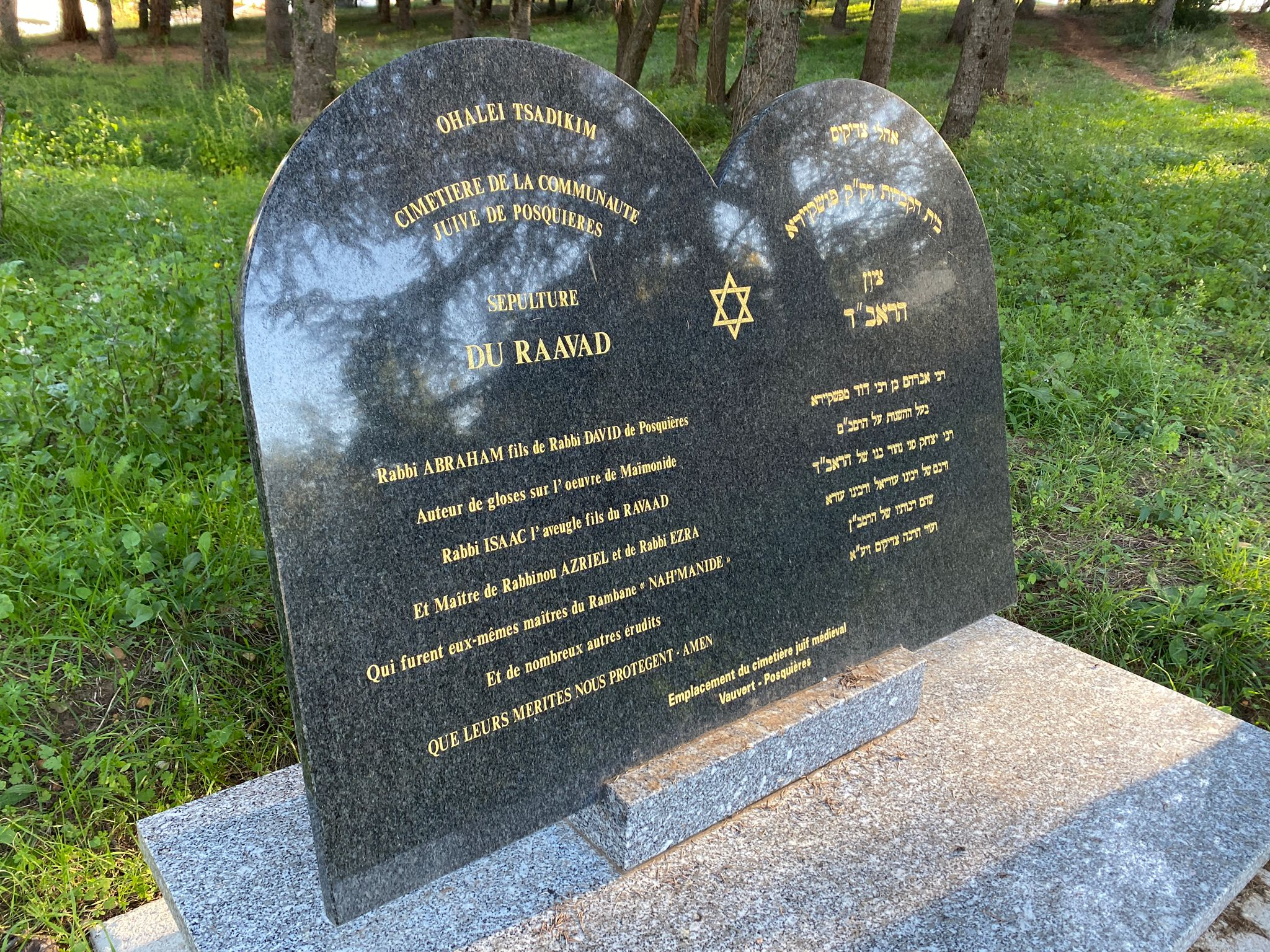
Burials of Kabbalists Abraham ben David le Rabad III and his son Isaac the Blind

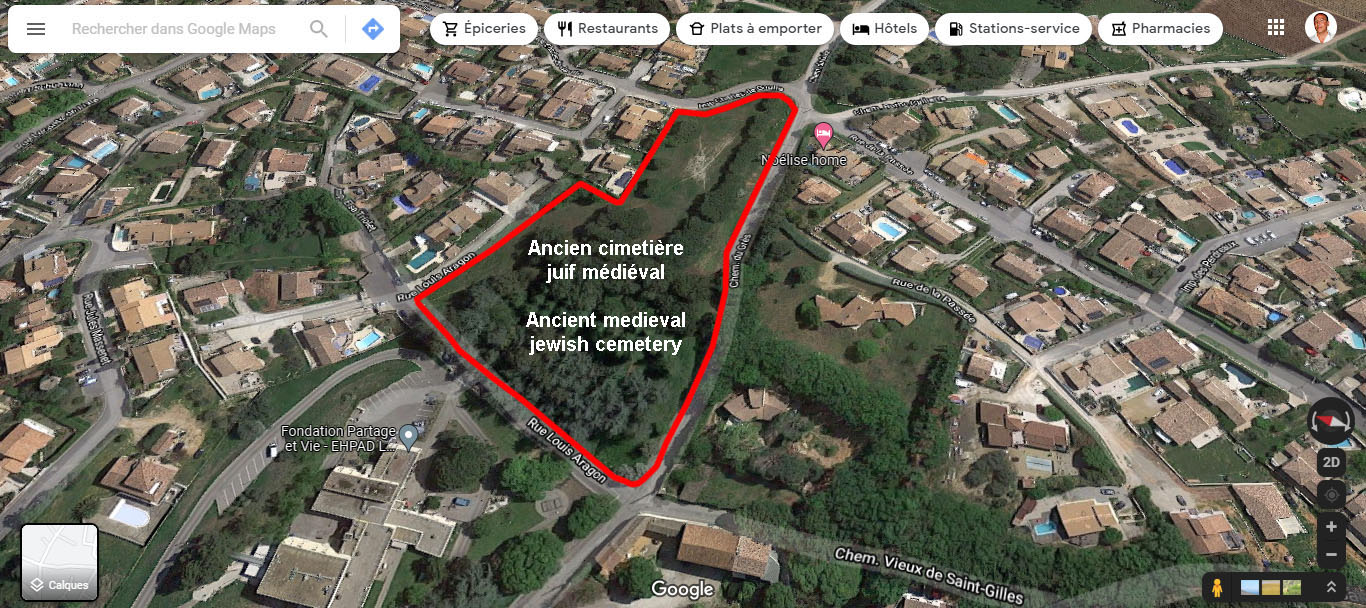
link to burial site

RABaD's maternal grandfather, Rabbi Yitzhak b. Yaakov Ibn Baruch of Mérida (1035–1094), who had compiled astronomical tables for the son of Shemuel ha-Nagid, was one of five rabbis in Spain renowned for their learning. Concerning the oral history of his maternal grandfather's family and how they came to Spain, the RABaD wrote: "When Titus prevailed over Jerusalem, his officer who was appointed over Hispania appeased him, requesting that he send to him captives made-up of the nobles of Jerusalem, and so he sent a few of them to him, and there were amongst them those who made curtains and who were knowledgeable in the work of silk, and [one] whose name was Baruch, and they remained in Mérida."

RABaD was born in Provence, France, and died at Posquières. He was the son-in-law of Abraham ben Isaac of Narbonne Av Beth Din (known as the RABaD II). He was the father of R' Isaac the Blind, a Neoplatonist and important Jewish mystical thinker. The teachers under whose guidance he acquired most of his Talmudic learning were R' Moses ben Joseph and R' Meshullam ben Jacob of Lunel.

RABaD remained in Lunel after completing his studies, and subsequently became one of the city's rabbinical authorities. He went to Montpellier, where he remained for a short time, and then moved to Nîmes, where he lived for a considerable period. R' Moses ben Judah refers to the rabbinical school of Nîmes, then under RABaD's direction, as the chief seat of Talmudic learning in Provence.

The center of the RABaD's activity was Posquières, after which place he is often called. The town is known as Vauvert today. It is difficult to determine when he moved to Posquières; but about 1165, Benjamin of Tudela, at the outset of his travels, called upon him there. He spoke of the Ravad's wealth and benevolence. Not only did he erect and keep in repair a large school-building, but he also cared for the material welfare of the poor students. A street exists in Vauvert with the name "Rue Ravad"' dedicated after him on the 800 anniversary of his death. His great wealth brought him into peril of his life because, to obtain some of it, Elzéar, the lord of Posquières, had him cast into prison, where, like Rabbi Meir of Rothenburg, he might have died, had not Count Roger II Trencavel, who was friendly to the Jews, intervened, and by his sovereignty banished the lord of Posquières to Carcassonne. Thereupon he returned to Posquières, where he remained until his death.

Among the many learned Talmudists who were his disciples in Posquières were Rabbis Isaac ha-Kohen of Narbonne, the first commentator upon the Jerusalem Talmud; Abraham ben Nathan of Lunel, author of HaManhig; Meir ben Isaac of Carcassonne, author of Sefer haEzer; and Asher ben Meshullam of Lunel, author of several rabbinical works. RABaD's influence on Jonathan of Lunel is also evident, though the latter did not attend his lectures.

== Literary works ==
RABaD was a prolific author. He not only wrote answers to hundreds of learned questions, to which responsa are still partially preserved in the collections Temim De'im, Orot Hayyim, and Shibbolei haLeket, but he also wrote a commentary on the whole Talmud and compiled several compendiums of halakha. In 1991, Rabbi Yosef Qafih published a compendium of his responsa which he gleaned from various sources, forty-two of which derived from handwritten manuscripts in his possession.

Most of his works are lost, but some survive, such as the "Sefer Ba'alei ha-Nefesh" (The Book of the Conscientious), a treatise on the laws relating to women, published in 1602, and his commentary on Torath Kohanim, published in 1862 at Vienna.

While Rashi's commentary furnished a well-paved road to the Talmud; Raavad, by his acute criticism, pointed out the way intelligently and with discrimination. This critical tendency is characteristic of all of Raavad's writings. Thus, in his commentary upon Torath Kohanim (pp. 41a, 71b), he made the caustic observation that many obscure passages in rabbinical literature owe their obscurity to the fact that occasional explanatory or marginal notes not tending to elucidate the text have been incorporated.

The title of "Ba'al Hasagot" (Critic), given to Raavad frequently by the rabbis, showed that they viewed the direction in which his ability lay. Indeed, critical annotations display his powers at their best, and justify his being ranked with the Rif, Rashi, and Maimonides. The tone he employed is also characteristic of his attitude toward the persons under criticism. He treated the Rif with the utmost respect, almost with humility, and referred to him as "the sun by whose brilliant rays our eyes are dazzled". His language toward R' Zerachiah ha-Levi of Girona ("Baal Hamaor") was harsh, almost hostile. Though only eighteen years old, Zerachia possessed the courage and the ability to write a sharp criticism of the Rif, and Raavad referred to him as an immature youth who dared to criticize his teacher.

According to Louis Ginzberg, Raavad's hasagot are notable for having prevented the replacement of the Talmud study with the exclusive study of the codes of Isaac Alfasi and Maimonides. While Jews in Muslim countries had a wide variety of serious intellectual outlets besides the Talmud (such as the sciences, philosophy, literature, and the Hebrew language), Ginzberg asserted that Ashkenazi Jews had no such outlets apart for Talmud study. Without the intricacies of the study of the Talmud and its commentaries, Ashkenazi Jews would have been left with no serious intellectual outlets.

=== Hasagot to Mishneh Torah ===
Raavad's criticism of Maimonides' code of Jewish law, Mishneh Torah, was very harsh. This was not due to any personal ill-feeling, but rather a result of the radical differences of view in matters of faith between two of the greatest Talmudists of the twelfth century.

Maimonides aimed to bring order to the vast labyrinth of Halakha by presenting final results in a definite, systematic and methodical manner. But to Raavad, this very aim was the main defect of the work. A legal code that did not state the sources and authorities from which its decisions were derived, and offered no proof of the correctness of its statements, was (in Raavad's opinion) entirely unreliable for practical rulings, for which purpose Maimonides had specifically designed it. Such a code (Raavad thought) could be justified only if written by a man claiming infallibility; by one who could demand that his assertions be accepted without question. If Maimonides had intended to stem the further development of Talmud study by reducing it to the form of a code, Raavad felt it his duty to oppose such an attempt, as contrary to the free spirit of rabbinical Judaism, which refuses to surrender blindly to authority.

Raavad was thus an opponent to the codification of the Halakha; but he was even more strongly opposed to the construction of a system of dogmas in Judaism, particularly according to the method followed by Maimonides, who often set up the concepts of the Aristotelian philosophy as Jewish theology. For example, Maimonides (in accordance with his philosophical conviction) declared God's incorporeality to be a principle of faith, or, as he formulates it, "whosoever conceives God to be a corporeal being is an apostate". In Raavad's circles a certain mystical anthropomorphistic conception of the Deity was common, and naturally Raavad resented a statement which practically declared his friends to be apostates. He, therefore, appended to Maimonides' formula this brief but emphatic criticism: "Why does he call such persons apostates? Men, better and worthier than he, have held this view, for which they believe they have found authority in the Scriptures and in a confusing view of the Aggadah." While the phrase concerning the Aggadah shows that Raavad himself was not a corporealist, he nevertheless opposed Maimonides' elevating incorporeality into a dogma. When Raavad conversely found Maimonides' opinions on the World to Come and the eternity of the world to be heretical, he has no word of vituperation for Maimonides, but merely contented himself with recording his difference of opinion. Thus, the ultra-conservative Talmudist showed himself to be more theologically tolerant than the greatest of the medieval Jewish philosophers.

Raavad was particularly severe on what he saw as Maimonides' attempts to smuggle in his philosophic views under cover of Talmudic passages. For example: Talmudic opinions on the definition of forbidden divination differ widely, perhaps because it was impractical to view every superstitious practice, many common among Jews at the time, as forbidden. Maimonides (who, from the point of view of his philosophy, viewed divination as a pure absurdity) ruled that even the innocent actions of Eliezer (Gen 24:14) and Jonathan (1 Sam 14:8–10) were forbidden divination. Here Raavad was not content with ruling Eliezer's and Jonathan's actions to have been permitted, but he declared that Maimonides deserved to be stricken with the Pulsa diNura, similar to a junior rabbi who had misrepresented the opinion of Levi ben Sisi. Such philosophical differences suffice to explain the intensity of Raavad's opposition to Maimonides, and particularly to Mishneh Torah, a work which Raavad himself describes as a great achievement.

Abraham Zacuto recorded an anecdote whereby he claims that Rambam, during his lifetime, eventually conceded to the correctness of his disputant, the Ravad, saying of him, "In all my life, no one has ever beaten me, except a certain artisan."

== Kabbalist and philosopher ==
Many Kabbalists view the Ravad as one of the fathers of their system, and this is true to the extent that he was inclined to mysticism, which led him to follow an ascetic mode of life and gained for him the title of "the pious." He wrote that "the holy spirit has appeared in our beit midrash" and taught them specific halachic rulings, and attributed rulings to "The Lord's counsel to those who fear Him".

A commentary to Sefer Yetzirah was once attributed to him, but has been shown instead to be the work of Yosef ben Shalom Ashkenazi.

The Ravad is widely considered to be the source of the commonly used diagram of the Sephirot of the Tree of Life that was ultimately written down by his son Isaac the Blind.

The Ravad was not an enemy of science, as many deem him. His works show that he was a close student of Hebrew philology, and the fact that he encouraged the translation of R' Bahya ibn Paquda's Chovot HaLevavot shows that he was not hostile to philosophy. This philosophic work argues strongly against the anthropomorphic conception of the Deity; and the favor with which Raavad looked upon it is sufficient grounds to acquit him of the charge of having held anthropomorphic views.

Some of his works show acquaintance with philosophy; for instance, his remark on "Hilchot Teshuvah", 5, end, is a literal quotation from Honein ben Isaac's "Musre ha-Philosophim," pp. 11, 12 (or Loewenthal, p. 39), which is extant only in Al-Charizi's translation.

== Descendants ==
The Ravad had many descendants, who today could carry the family name Raivid, Rayvid, Ravid, and Ravad. Family records indicate they made their way to Spain, where they appeared in Toledo and Barcelona and were reputedly advisers in the court of Ferdinand and Isabella. After the Expulsion, they were exiled to Italy, from whence they made their way to northern, and later to eastern, Europe, where they served as rabbis in Telšiai, Lithuania, and teachers in its Telshe yeshiva. Before the First World War, they emigrated to countries throughout the world, and today they live on every inhabited continent.
