= Gallician =

Village in France

Coordinates: 43.644°N 4.296°E

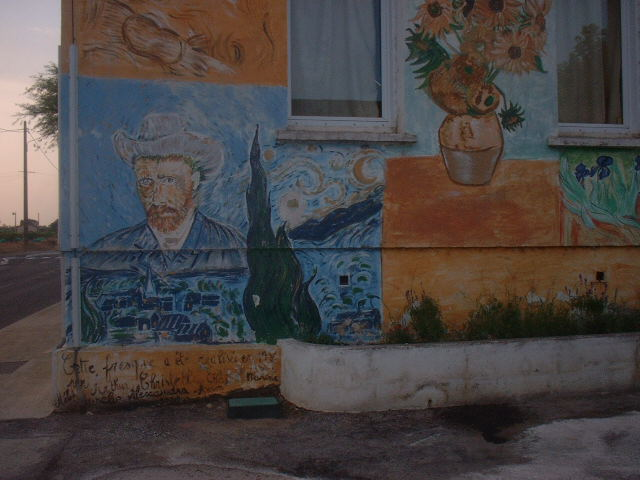
Murals from outside the school.

Gallician (French pronunciation: [ɡalisjɑ̃]) is a village in the commune of Vauvert in the département of Gard, in the region of Languedoc-Roussillon, southern France. It has a population of about 1,000 people. It is located 6 km south of Vauvert, on the Canal du Rhône à Sète, which links the river Rhône with the Canal du Midi at Sète.

== Features ==
The village contains a church, three large houses (Mas Beata, Mas du Notaire and Mas de Mourgues), a bakers, a small supermarket and two bar/restaurants, a bullfight arena, a camp site, a cooperative winery and the Van Gogh school for younger children.

At Gallician is the start of the Via Rhôna, a new long-distance cycle path which follows the Rhône, and links the village to Palavas-les-Flots in Hérault.
