= Louis Médard =

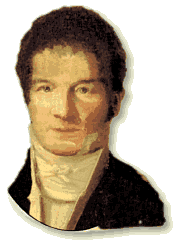
- Born: 2 July 1768; Lunel
- Died: 26 July 1841 (aged 73); Montpellier

Louis Médard (2 July 1768 – 26 July 1841) was a French indiennes merchant and rare books bibliophile.

== Biography ==
From a family, member of the Reformed Church and originated from Marsillargues, student at the Collège des Jésuites of Nîmes, canut in Lyon during two years and then, director of his own company Médard & Parlier founded with Jean Parlier, descent of an important silk manufacturer family, from Le Pompidou in Barre-des-Cévennes. Childless, Louis Médard wanted to turn his beloved collection of books into a study collection.

I hereby bequeath the sole ownership of my reading room to my native town of Lunel, but with express conditions that the College be maintained for all time, that my collection of books never be altered and that the inhabitants of Lunel be granted full enjoyment of it with the help of a librarian...

By this testament, Louis Médard bequeathed his collection of nearly 5,000 printed works and manuscripts to his fellow citizens of Lunel, whom he wanted to serve.

== Collection components ==
The library, stored in an 18th-century building in the historic center of Lunel, offers a little journey into history of the book. Out of respect for his books, for all of the works are rare and precious. Manuscripts from the Middle Ages, first editions from the 16th and 17th centuries, engraved books from the 18th century, special collections about the French Revolution. The bindings are remarkable, most dating from the 19th century; many were created in the great Parisian workshops as René Simier, Thouvenin, Bauzonnet, Purgold,... In addition, 250 came from workshops in Montpellier. For the purposes of teaching, this book lover had all of his works itemized in two catalogues, and dictated forewords which were placed at the beginning of works on which he wished to comment.
