= Asher ben Meshullam =

12th-century French Jewish theologian and Talmudic scholar

Asher ben Meshullam was a Jewish theologian and Talmudic scholar who lived at Lunel in the second half of the 12th century CE. A renowned Talmudist, he was a son of the well-known Meshullam ben Jacob, and a pupil of Joseph ibn Plat and the Raavad.

He shared Raavad's ascetic tendencies. Benjamin of Tudela, in the first part of his "Travels," says that Asher lived in complete seclusion, wholly devoted to the study of the Torah, and that he never tasted meat. At the same time Asher was not hostile to philosophy. Yehudah Ibn Tibbon, in a letter to Asher, praised his fondness for science, and in his testament exhorted his son to cultivate Asher's friendship.

== Works ==
Asher was the author of several Talmudic works, including:

- Hilkhot Yom Tov, ("Rules for the Holidays")
- Sefer haMatanot, ("The Book of Gifts") a work referring perhaps to the tithes payable to the kohanim.

Neither of these writings seems to have been preserved.

According to an entry in the manuscript of the small Midrash Aseret ha-Dibberot, Asher was its author, but the statement is not verifiable.
