= Urfalim =

Jewish Levite community from Urfa

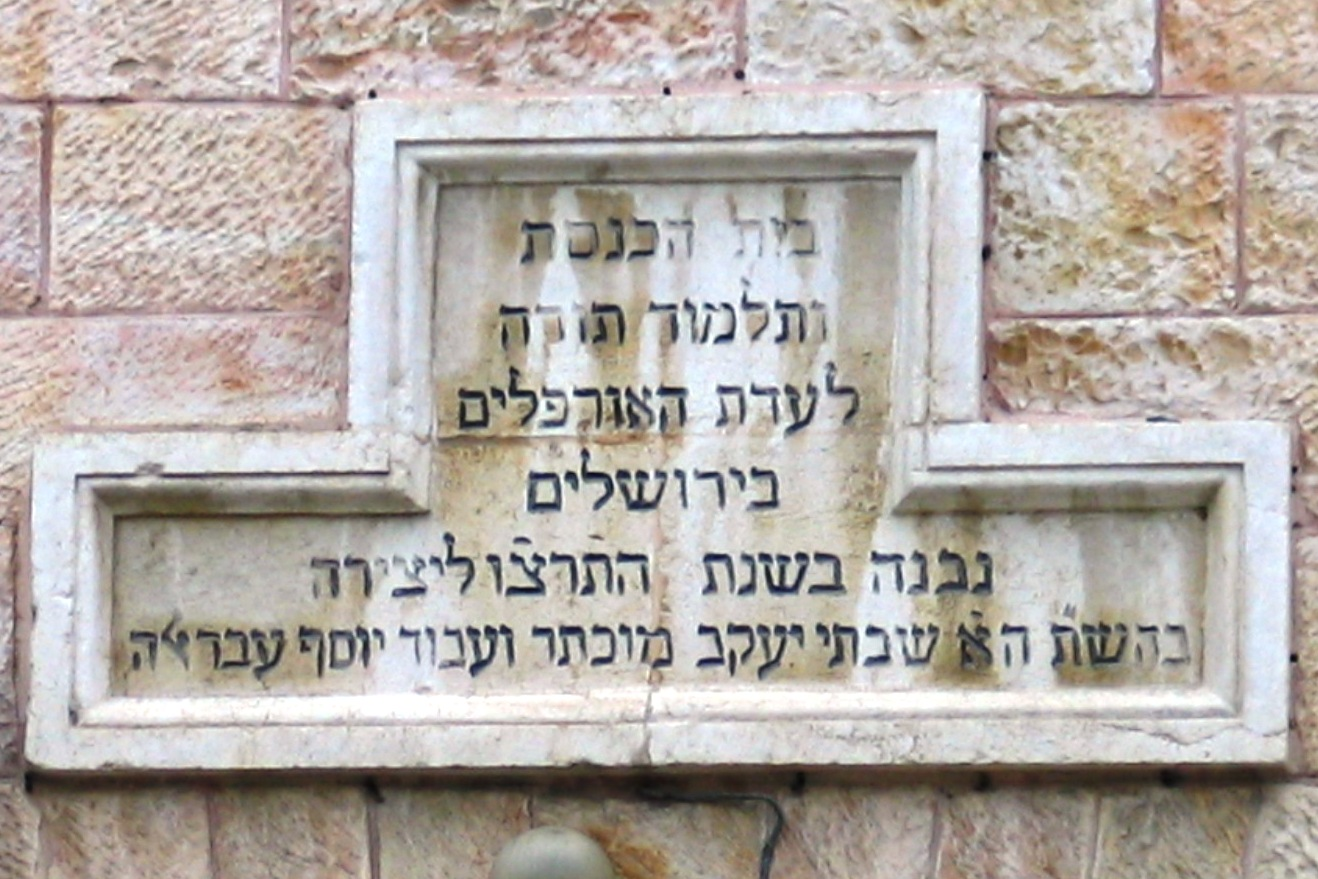
Writing on Urfalim synagogue in Jerusalem

Urfalim (Hebrew: אוּרְפָלִים) or Urfan Jews, also known as Urfan Levites, are a Jewish (predominantly Levite) community originating from Urfa, in south-eastern Anatolia, in modern Turkey. Jews from the Anatolian villages of Suruç and Çermik (named Surucalim and Cermikalim) are also included within the Urfalim definition, due to the geographic proximity among those communities, and due to marriage relations between the three. The community fled Urfa in 1896, eventually relocating to Jerusalem and Tiberias.

== History ==
According to several traditions, Urfa is the Biblical Ur Kaśdim (Ur of the Chaldees, or City of the Chaldees), though most archaeologists establish the location of Ur Kaśdim as being identical with Ur in modern-day Iraq. When Alexander the Great conquered Urfa, he renamed it Ruha. During a significant period of history, the city was called in its Greek variation as Edessa. Tradition of the Urfalim tells, the community was quite small, and had grown over 500 years by influx of Mizrahi Jews from Iraq and Aleppo. During the 19th century, the community included about 1,000 people.

== Religious style ==
Many of the Urfalim are named Levi (descendants of the Levi tribe). In order to make a distinction between many Levi families, a nickname had been added, such as: "Levi Abud", "Levi Aslan", "Levi Hamami", "Levi Urfali" etc. Other family names of Urfalim include Ba'sher, Gila (Gil), Yagen, Gazoli and simply Urfali.

== Migration ==
Most of the Urfalim community migrated to Ottoman Syria in December 1896, fleeing the Hamidian massacres of Armenians, instigated by Ottoman Sultan Abdul Hamid II. The massacres marked the end of the multicultural period, which had characterized Urfa and Anatolia in general for millennia. On their way to the Land of Israel, some Urfalim settled in Aleppo, whereas most moved on, settling in Tiberias (Beirut Vilayet) and mostly Jerusalem (Mutesarrifiyyet of Jerusalem). Some later moved from Jerusalem to Rishon LeZion to work in orchards. In 1947, with the eruption of the Aleppo pogrom, most of the Jews of Aleppo fled the city, relocating to Israel as well.

== Urfalim today ==
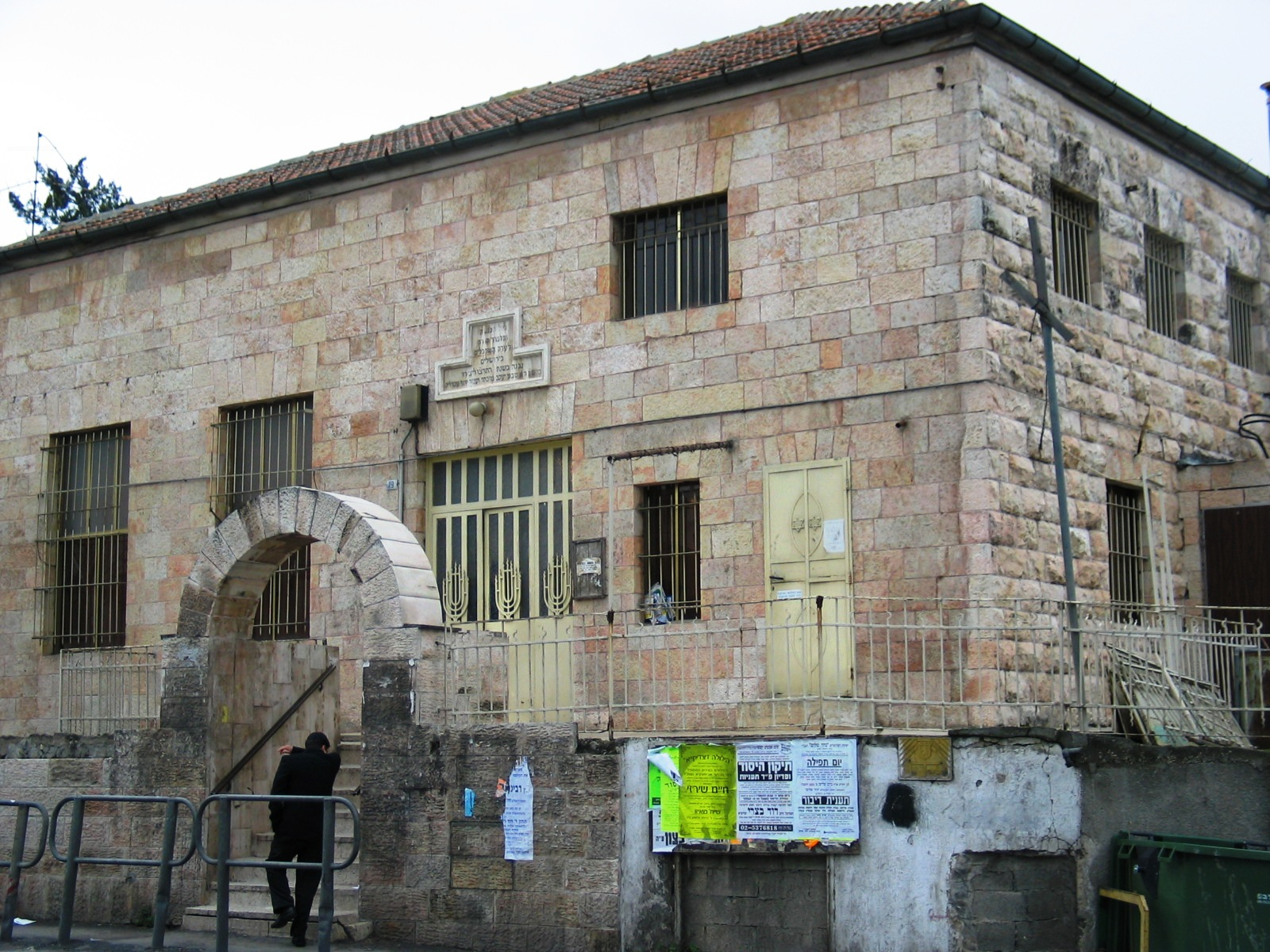
Urfalim synagogue in Jerusalem

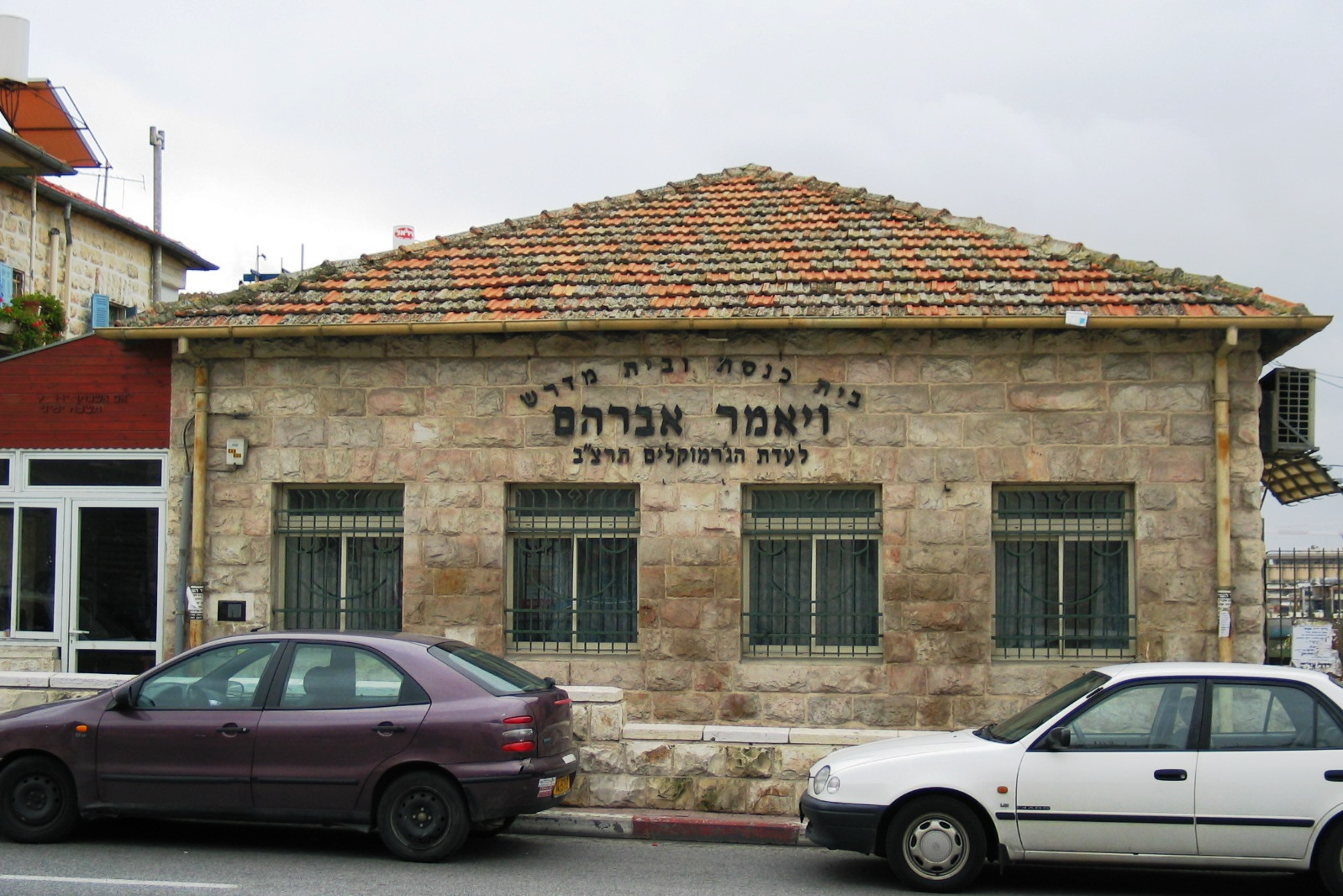
Cermikalim synagogue in Jerusalem

== See also ==
=== Other Levites ===
- Horowitz family
- Benveniste family
- Cohen
