= Ezra Malki =

Religious life
- Religion: Judaism

Ezra Malki was rabbi of Rhodes in the seventeenth century; he was brother-in-law of Hezekiah de Silva, the author of "Peri Ḥadash."

Malki was the author of "Malki ba-Ḳodesh" (Salonica, 1749). This work contains novellæ on the laws of Passover given in the Shulchan Aruch (Oraḥ Ḥayyim) and in the "Bet Yosef"; commentaries on the Pesaḥ Haggadah and on the parts of the Mishneh Torah which contain the laws concerning the Passover lamb, Rosh ha-Shanah, Yom Kippur, and lulav; novellæ on the Sefer Mitzvot Gadol; and collectanea.

Malki also wrote "Shemen la-Ma'or" (Constantinople, 1760), novellæ on the first chapter of Baba Meẓi'a, in which he defends Zerahiah ha-Levi against the attacks of Naḥmanides; "'En Mishpaṭ" (ib. 1770), responsa; "'Enot Mayim" (Salonica, 1811), sermons.
