= Meshullam ben Jacob =

12th-century Franco-Jewish Talmudist

Meshullam son of Jacob (or Meshullam HaKohen ben Ya'akov) also known as Rabbeinu Meshullam hagodol (Rabbi Meshullem the great) was a Franco-Jewish Talmudist of the twelfth century CE. He led a Talmudic Yeshiva in Lunel which produced several famous scholars, and was an intimate friend of Abraham ben Isaac, Av beth din of Narbonne, who addressed to him several responsa, and spoke of him in high terms. His Talmudic decisions are quoted in Sefer ha-Terumot.

He was interested also in philosophy. According to Yehudah ibn Tibbon, whom he encouraged to translate Bahya ibn Paquda's Al-Hidayah ila Fara'id al-Qulub (Chovot ha-Levavot) into Hebrew, he wrote several works dealing with moral philosophy, advised and assisted other Jewish writers, and possessed a large library. R' Yehudah Ibn Tibbon never wearied of praising R' Meshullam's zeal in investigating the various branches of knowledge.

Meshullam was the father of the renowned Asher ben Meshullam HaKohen. Meshullam's disciples include the Raavad and the Baal Hama'or. Meshullam died in Lunel in 1170.

== Resources ==
- which cites:

- Henri Gross, Gallia Judaica, p. 229.

- Gitlitz, David M. & Linda Kay Davidson. “Pilgrimage and the Jews’’ (Westport: CT: Praeger, 2006), 43-.
