= Azaria Piccio =

Venetian preacher (1579–1647)

Azaria Piccio (Venetian: Azarìa Piccio; Hebrew: עזריה בן אפרים פיגו, romanized: Azarya ben Efrayim Figu; Portuguese: Azarias Figo; 1579 – 6 February 1647) was a Venetian Talmudist, sofer (scribe) and darshan (preacher) who served in the Jewish communities of Venice and Pisa.

== Biography ==
Piccio was born in Venice in 1579. Originally destined for a medical career, Piccio left medical school and devoted himself to the study of the Talmud. Referring to this episode in his life, Piccio wrote the nowadays oft-quoted passage, “I abandoned my girlfriend,” referring to his medical studies and general preoccupation with the secular world, “and went to my true love.”

As a rabbi, Piccio became known for his oratory skills. His sermons were skilfully laced with scientific—particularly medical—references, and were composed according to classical models. His sermons in Hebrew are noted for their erudite but direct style. He was especially close to his mentor Leon of Modena, with whom he shared an openness toward the modern world. David B. Ruderman wrote that, “while [Piccio] argues for the insufficiency of the sciences, he clearly does not dismiss their validity altogether.”

Piccio had two sons, Lazzaro and Efrem, who together wrote a commentary on Yeruẖam ben Meshullam’s Toldot Adam veH̱avva. Piccio outlived both, who had perished during the 1629–31 Italian plague. Piccio died in Rovigo on 6 February 1647 and was buried there. He is today considered as having been “one of the last great talmudists produced by Italian Jewry”.

== Publications ==
Piccio was the author of Iggerot uteshuvot (“Letters and Responsa”), published within Issacar Eilenburg's Be’er sheva (Venice, 1614). As rabbi in Pisa, he wrote Giddulei Terumah (1643), a commentary on Shmu’el haSardi's Sefer Haterumot. A compilation of 75 Sabbath and holiday sermons that he delivered in Venice was published under the title Binah Le’ittim (1647–1648), a work which remains popular to this day, particularly among Eastern Jews.
