= Judah ben Saul ibn Tibbon =

Spanish translator and rabbi

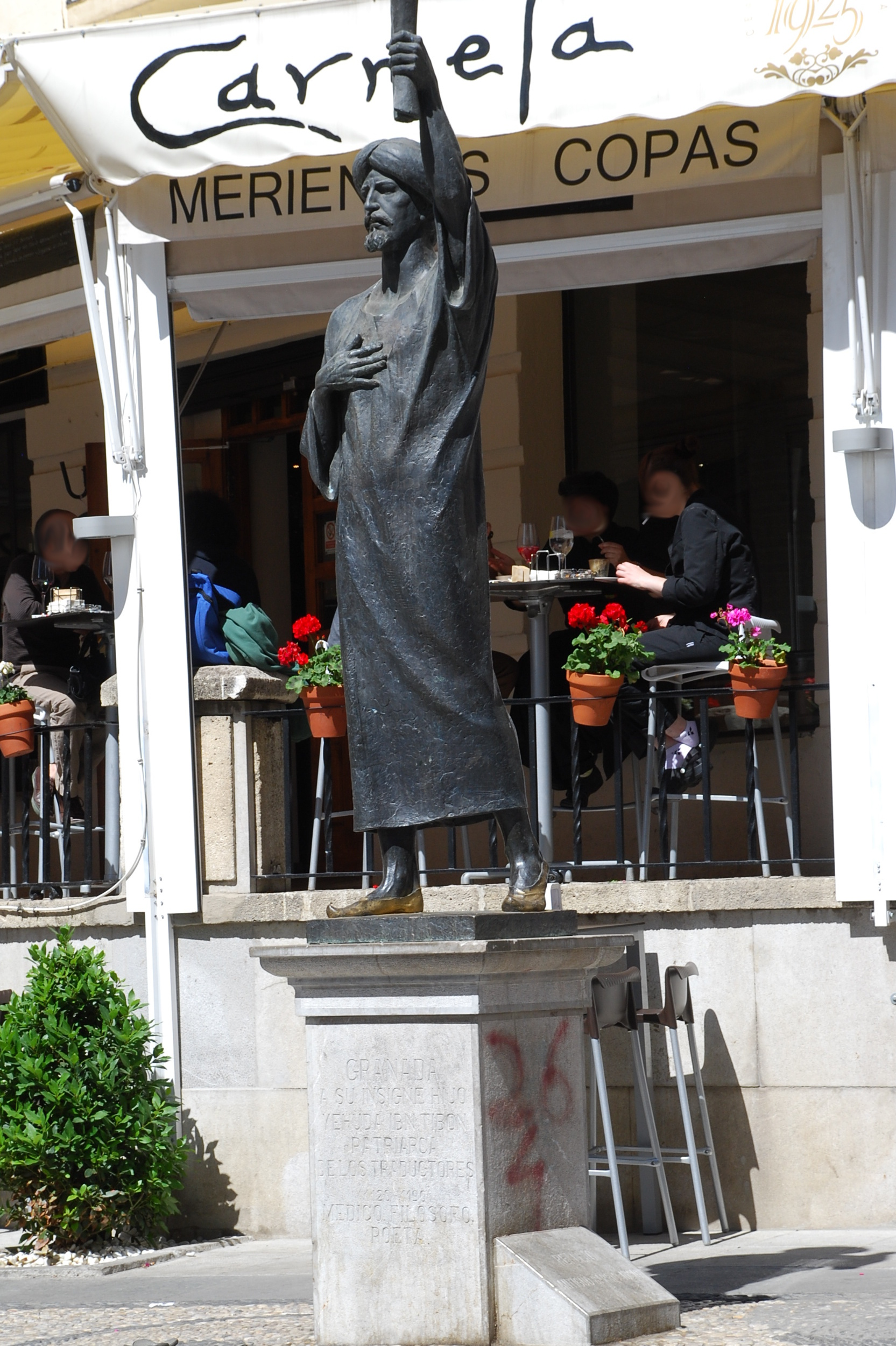
- Statue of Judah ben Saul ibn Tibbon in Granada, Spain.
- Born: 1120; Granada
- Died: c. 1190; Marseille
- Known for: translations
- Children: Samuel ibn Tibbon

Judah ben Saul ibn Tibbon (1120 – after 1190) was a translator and physician.

Born in Granada, he left Spain in 1150, and went to Lunel in southern France. Benjamin of Tudela mentions him as a physician there in 1160. He died around 1190, in Marseille, France.

Judah lived on terms of intimacy with Meshullam ben Jacob and with Meshullam's two sons, Asher and Aaron, whom in his will he recommends as friends to his only son, Samuel. He was also a close friend of Abraham ben David of Posquières and of Zerahiah ha-Levi, the latter of whom he freely recognized as a greater scholar than himself, and whose son he also wished to have as a friend for his own son. He had two daughters whose marriage caused him much anxiety.

== Translations ==
Judah's works include the translation into Hebrew of the following:

- Bahya ibn Paquda's Chovot ha-Levavot. The Arabic title of this work was "Al-Hidayah ila Fara'id al-Qulub." In English, 'The Duties of the Heart'.

He was induced to undertake this work by Meshullam ben Jacob and his son Asher, at whose desire he translated the first treatise, in 1161. After its completion Joseph Kimhi translated the other nine treatises and afterward the first one also. At the wish of Abraham ben David of Posquières, Judah continued his translation of the work. Judah's translation is the only one that has held its place.

- Solomon ibn Gabirol's Tikkun Middot ha-Nefesh (printed together with the first-mentioned translation at Constantinople in 1550).
- Judah ha-Levi's Kitab al-Ḥujjah, under the title Sefer ha-Kuzari (1167). In this instance as well, Judah's translation drove that of his rival, Judah ibn Cardinal, out of the field, so that only a small portion of the latter's work has been preserved.
- Two works by Ibn Janah:

- His grammar, Kitab al-Luma' , under the title Sefer ha-Rikmah (1171; edited by B. Goldberg, with notes by R. Kirchheim, Frankfurt-on-the-Main, 1856). The translator's preface is interesting for the history of literature, and it gives Judah's opinions on the art of Hebrew translation.

- Kitab al-Uṣul, under the title Sefer ha-Shorashim (edited by Bacher, Berlin, 1896). Isaac al-Barceloni and Isaac ha-Levi had already translated this dictionary as far as the letter lamed, and Judah finished it in 1171.

- Saadia's Kitab al-Amanat wal-I'tiḳadat, under the title Sefer ha-Emunot weha-De'ot (1186; first ed. Constantinople, 1562).

== Testament ==
Judah's ethical will, with its homely style and frankness, is one of the most interesting in this class of literature. It gives insight into the soul of the man and his relation to his son, also a scholar and translator, Samuel. Against the latter his chief complaint is that he never initiated his father into his literary or business affairs, never asked for his advice, and, in fact, hid everything from him.

He recommends Samuel to practise writing in Arabic, since Jews like Samuel ha-Nagid, for example, attained rank and position solely through being able to write in that language. He exhorts him to morality and to the study of the Torah as well as of the profane sciences, including medicine. He is to read grammatical works on Sabbaths and festivals, and is not to neglect the reading of "Mishle" and of "Ben Mishle." In regard to his medical practise he gives his son sage advice. He further advises his son to observe rigorously the laws of diet, lest he, like others, become ill frequently in consequence of intemperate and unwholesome eating, which would not fail to engender mistrust in him as a physician on the part of the general public. Interesting are Judah's references to his library as his "best treasure", his "best companion", and to his book-shelves as "the most beautiful pleasure-gardens." He adds:

I have collected a large library for thy sake so that thou needest never borrow a book of any one. As thou thyself seest, most students run hither and thither searching for books without being able to find them. . . . Look over thy Hebrew books every month, thy Arabic ones every two months, thy bound books every three months. Keep thy library in order, so that thou wilt not need to search for a book. Prepare a list of the books on each shelf, and place each book on its proper shelf. Take care also of the loose, separate leaves in thy books, because they contain exceedingly important things which I myself have collected and written down. Lose no writing and no letter which I leave thee. . . . Cover thy book-shelves with beautiful curtains, protect them from water from the roof, from mice, and from all harm, because they are thy best treasure.

His fine linguistic sense and his conception of the art of translating are shown by his counsels on this subject.

== See also ==
- Ibn Tibbon a family list.
- Hachmei Provence
