= Samuel ben Samson =

13th-century Jewish rabbi who visited the Land of Israel

Rabbi Samuel ben Samson
- שמואל בן שמשון
- Title: Rabbi

Personal life
- Born: France
- Era: 13th century
- Notable work(s): Travel accounts (pilgrimage writings)
- Known for: Pilgrimage to the Land of Israel (1210)
- Other names: Shmuel ben Shimshon
- Occupation: Rabbi, traveler

Religious life
- Religion: Judaism
- Movement: Rabbinic Judaism

Samuel ben Samson (שמואל בן שמשון also Shmuel ben Shimshon) was a rabbi who lived in the Kingdom of France and made a pilgrimage to Palestine in 1210, visiting a number of villages and cities there, including the Old City of Jerusalem. There, he ascended and prayed on the Temple Mount and the Mount of Olives. He also visited the Tomb of the Patriarchs in Hebron, as well as Beth-Shean, Tiberias, and Safed. Among his companions were Jonathan ben David ha-Cohen, and it is likely that ben Samson served as his secretary. Two other rabbis were travelling with them, and the four travelled as far east as Mosul. According to George Sarton, some 300 medieval English and French Jews inspired by ben Samson's account settled in the land of Israel in 1211.

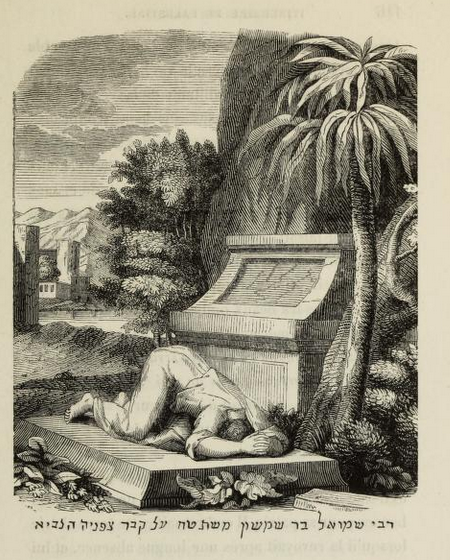
A 19th-century illustration depicting Samuel ben Samson prostrating on the tomb of the prophet Zephaniah.

The first mention of Safed in Jewish history appears in the writings of ben Samson from the 13th century, where he notes the existence of a Jewish community of at least 50 members there.

== Bibliography ==
- Adler, Elkan Nathan (2004), Jewish Travellers, RoutledgeCurzon, p. 107, ISBN 0-415-34466-2
- Janin, Hunt (2002), Four Paths to Jerusalem: Jewish, Christian, Muslim, and Secular Pilgrimages, 1000 BCE to 2001 CE, McFarland, ISBN 978-0-7864-1264-8
- Sarton, George (1931), Introduction To The History Of Science Volume II From Rabbi Ben Ezra To Roger Bacon, The Williams & Wilkins Company
- Schechter, Solomon (2003), Studies in Judaism: Second Series (Jewish Studies Classics 3), Gorgias Press LLC, ISBN 978-1-59333-039-2
