= Zerachiah ha-Levi of Girona =

12th century Catalonian rabbi and poet

Zerachiah ben Isaac ha-Levi Gerondi (Hebrew: זרחיה הלוי), called the ReZaH, RaZBI or Baal Ha-Maor (author of the book Ha-Maor) was born about 1115 in the town of Girona in the Kingdom of Aragon (now Catalonia), hence the name Gerondi. He died after 1186 in Lunel in Provence. He was a famous hakham, Torah and Talmud commentator, and a poet.

== Biography ==
Zerachiah was born into a rabbinic family called the Yitzhari of Girona. His father was Isaac Ha-Levi, a Talmudic scholar in Provence, and the son of Zerachiah Ha-Levi, his namesake. The elder Zerachiah was a son of Shem Tov Ha-Levi, one of the greatest Talmudic scholars of Hakhmei Provence. The family name HaYitzhari originates in their claim to direct descent from the prophet Samuel, who according to Jewish tradition was a direct descendant of Yitzhar, son of Kohath, son of Levi, son of Jacob.

In his youth, Zerachiah moved to Provence and studied with the Talmudic scholars of Narbonne; another was Moses ben Joseph ben Merwan ha-Levi. At the age of 19 he wrote a piyyut in Aramaic and devoted himself to halakhic problems. For many years thereafter, he lived in Lunel (studying with Meshullam of Lunel), but the conflicts, disputes and quarrels constantly splitting the community forced him to leave.

Zerachiah was not only a thorough Talmudist of great erudition, with an analytic and synthetic mind, but he was also deeply versed in Arabic literature, in philosophy, and in astronomy, and was, also, a gifted poet, combining elegance of style with elevation of sentiment. Judah ben Saul ibn Tibbon said of Zerachiah: "he was unique in his generation and wiser than I", and praised him for his elaborate style of writing.

== Works ==
=== Sefer Ha-Maor ===
Zerachiah knew Arabic well and quickly absorbed the disciplines studied in Provence, but from his writings one could easily feel the tension that existed between him and his surroundings. Fame of a scholar and expert on halakhic problems came to him thanks to his book Sefer Ha-Maor which was begun when he was 19 years old, and was completed in the 1180s.

The book is divided into two parts: Ha-Maor Ha-Gadol (the great light) and Ha-Maor Ha-Katan (the small light). In the first part the issues connected to Talmudic tractates "Berakhot", "Mo'ed" and "Hullin" are discussed, and in the second part - "Nashim" and "Nezikin". In this book, he consistently and critically objects to Isaac Alfasi's views, but simultaneously holds him and his works in high esteem. Aware of the fact that he was much younger than Alfasi, whose halakhic decisions were accepted by the Sefardim, and his authority was undisputed, Zechariah vindicates himself in his prologue by bringing examples of other young scholars who differed with acknowledged sages, such as Jonah ibn Janah. He is apologetic in criticizing Alfasi and justifies himself by saying that his insights only enhance this indispensable code. In a comic and poetic style, he writes about himself, "Do not classify this youth as an empty barrel, for ofttimes aged wine may be found in a new vessel". His father also wrote a poem about him, praising him and blessing his creator for giving him such a gifted prodigy.

These writings belong to a special kind of Rabbinical literature: so-called "objections" raised by the scholars of Provence against attempts by the scholars from the Muslim world to force the adoption of their halakhot and commentaries. From this point of view, Zerachiah stands together with Abraham ben David of Posquieres, known because he objected to Maimonides. However, as Rabbi Abraham was much more accepting of Alfasi, prompting his criticism of Zerachiah's criticism of him, this classification is vague. Zerachiah, in many cases, prefers the variants of commentaries supplemented by Rashi, and, to a great extent, he relies upon the methods of the scholars of France in commentaries on the Gemara. From this point of view, the works of Zerachiah reflect a mingling of the school of halakha and the drasha of Sefardic scholars and France not uncommon in Provence.

Zerachiah's independence also displeased the conservatives, however, and refutations of his criticisms were written by Nahmanides under the title Milḥamot Hashem, "Wars of God" and by Abraham ben David of Posquières, who alluded in his harsh fashion to Zerahiah as an immature youth who had dared to criticize his master, and even accused him of having appropriated some of Abraham's interpretations without mentioning the author. A justification of Zerahiah's critique was written by Ezra Malki under the title Shemen la-Ma'or, and since 1552, the Sefer ha-Ma'or has always been printed alongside Alfasi.

=== Sefer Ha-Tsava ===
Additionally, Zerachiah wrote the book Sefer Ha-Tsava, which explained 13 principles of drasha used in Gemarah and composed various halakhoth related to shechita and niddah, etc. At the same time, he endeavored to show that Alfasi had not observed the principles laid down in the Talmud for halakic interpretation.

Like its predecessor, this work was criticized by Naḥmanides, who justified Alfasi's position. Significant differences in opinion also emerged between Zerachiah and Abraham ben David, who wrote objections to the Sefer Ha-Maor. Zerachiah replied in kind, writing objections to Abraham's work Baalei Ha-Nefesh full of sarcasm and personal attacks. Both the Sefer Ha-Tsava and the criticism of Naḥmanides were inserted in the Sefer Temim De'im (§§ 225, 226, Venice, 1622), and were also published separately at Shklov in 1803.

=== Other works ===
Zerachya was likewise the author of the following works: Hilkot Sheḥiṭah u-Bediḳah, mentioned in the Sefer ha-Ma'or at the end of the first chapter on the treatise Ḥullin; Hassagot 'al Ba'ale ha-Nefesh, a critique of RABaD's treatise on the laws relating to women, published in part with the Ba'ale ha-Nefesh (Venice, 1741; Berlin, 1762); Dibre Ribot, a controversy with RABaD on civil jurisprudence, mentioned in the Sefer ha-Ma'or on Baba Meẓi'a and cited in part by Bezaleel Ashkenazi in his Shiṭṭah Meḳubbeẓet on Baba Meẓi'a, p. 98a; Sela' ha-Maḥaloḳot, mentioned in the Sefer ha-Ma'or at the end of the first chapter of Shebu'ot; Pitḥe Niddah, quoted by the author's grandson in his Bedeḳ ha-Bayit (vii. 3); a dissertation on the Mishnah Kinnim, published at Constantinople in 1795; and responsa, mentioned in the "Sefer ha-Ma'or" at the end of the second chapter of Giṭṭin and quoted in the Sefer ha-Terumot (xlv. 1).

Zerachya was the author of numerous liturgical poems, eighteen of which are found in the Sephardic Maḥzor. His poetry is included in various liturgical rites and was published in a critical edition by B. Bar-Tikva.

== Legacy ==
Zerachia Halevi influenced greatly the following generations of rabbis and scholars, and some of them wrote responsa in his defense, among them Nahmanides, who previously had been his irreconcilable critic. Even Ravad, who outlived his friend and rival by 13 years, softened his tone after Zerachiah's death and wrote about him with great respect, criticizing him only on the substance of issues under consideration.

== See also ==
- Hachmei Provence

== Jewish Encyclopedia bibliography ==
- Leopold Zunz, Z. G. p. 476;
- idem, in Allg. Zeit. des Jud. iii. 679;
- Sachs, Religiöse Poesie, p. 257;
- Dukes, in Orient, Lit. ix. 760;
- Leser Landshuth, 'Ammude ha-'Abodah, p. 63;
- Reifmann, Toledot R. Zeraḥyah ha-Lewi, Prague, 1853;
- Eliakim Carmoly, La France Israélite, p. 107;
- Moritz Steinschneider, Cat. Bodl. cols. 2589-2593;
- Fuenn, Keneset Yisrael, p. 570;
- Henri Gross, Gallia Judaica, pp. 255, 282;
- Michael, Heimann Joseph, (1891) Or ha-Ḥayyim, Frankfort-on-the-Main (in Hebrew). p. 367, No. 826
