= Chovot HaLevavot =

Book by Rabbi Bahya ibn Paquda

Chovot HaLevavot (Hebrew: חוֹבוֹת הַלְּבָבוֹת, romanized: Ḥoḇoṯ hal-Leḇāḇoṯ; Judeo-Arabic: כתאב אל-הידאיה אילא פרעיד אל-קולוב, romanized: Kitāb al‑Hidāyah ilā Farāʾiḍ al‑Qulūb, lit. 'Book of Guidance to the Duties [of] the Heart[s]'), (Note: Arabic: كتاب الهداية إلى فرائض القلوب, romanized: Kitāb al-Hidāyat ilá Farāʾiḍ al-Qulūb) known in English as The Duties of the Hearts, is the primary work of the Jewish scholar Bahya ibn Paquda, a rabbi believed to have lived in the taifa of Zaragoza in al-Andalus in the eleventh century. It was written in Judeo-Arabic c. 1080 CE and translated into Hebrew by Judah ben Saul ibn Tibbon during 1161–1180 as Torat Chovot HaLevavot (תּוֹרַת חוֹבוֹת הַלְּבָבוֹת, 'Teaching of [the] Duties [of] the Heart'). There was another contemporary translation by Joseph Kimhi, but its complete text did not endure time. In 1973, Yosef Qafih published his Hebrew translation from the original Judeo-Arabic, the latter appearing beside his Hebrew translation.

== Organization and influences ==
The Duties of the Heart is divided into ten sections termed "gates" (שערים, šeʿārîm), which correspond to the ten fundamental principles that, according to ibn Paquda's view, constitute human spiritual life. The book makes numerous references to both Hebrew Biblical and Talmudic texts.

== Contents and message ==
The core principle of spirituality, according to ibn Paquda, is the acknowledgment of God as the singular creator and designer of all things. He sets "Sha'ar HaYihud" (Gate of the Divine Unity) as the introductory section of the work. Using the Jewish declaration of faith—"Shema Yisrael: the LORD is our God, the LORD is One!"—as his thought's foundation, the author underscores that Jewish religious life primarily involves an emotional connection with God, emphasizing love and ownership over intellectual understanding.

Ibn Paquda posited that acceptance of belief should not be based solely on unexamined faith, as exemplified by children, or on the teachings of predecessors, which may characterize those who adhere blindly to tradition and lack independent thought. He argued that belief in God should not be interpreted in an anthropomorphic manner but based on conviction stemming from thorough knowledge and research. The Torah encourages the use of reason and knowledge as validation for the existence of God, suggesting that it is the responsibility of individuals to engage in speculative reasoning and knowledge in pursuit of true faith.

Instead of intending to give a compendium of metaphysics, ibn Paquda furnishes a system of religious philosophy with merit in this first "gate". Unfamiliar with Avicenna's works, which replaced Neoplatonic mysticism with clear Aristotelian thought, ibn Paquda, like many Arabic philosophers before him, bases his arguments upon a creation myth. He starts from the following three premises:

1. A thing does not create itself which is known on account of that before it existed there is no it to create itself, whereas after it exists it already exists (see also Saadia, "Emunot," i. 2).
2. The causes of things are necessarily limited in number and lead to the presumption of a first cause (i.e., God) that is necessarily self-existent, having neither beginning nor end, because everything that has an end must have a beginning.
3. All composite beings have a beginning; on account of that, it must have a composer.

The world is arranged and furnished like a great house: the sky forms the ceiling, the earth forms the floor, and the stars form the lamps. Humankind is the proprietor, to whom the three kingdoms—the animal, the vegetable, and the mineral—are submitted for use, each composed of the four elements. (The celestial sphere, composed of a fifth element—quinta essentia, according to Aristotle, or fire, according to others—makes an exception.) The four elements are composed of matter and form, substance and accidental qualities, such as warmth and cold, state of motion and rest, and so forth. Consequently, by combining many forces, the universe must have a creative power as its cause. Furthermore, the existence of the world cannot be due to mere chance. Where there is purpose manifested, there must have been wisdom at work.

=== Unity of God ===
Ibn Paquda then proceeds, following chiefly Saadia Gaon and the Mutakallimin ("Kalamists"), to prove the unity of God (tawhid) by showing:

1. All classes, causes, and principles of things lead back to one principal cause.
2. The harmony of all things in nature, the interdependence of all creatures, the wondrous plan and wisdom displayed in the structure of the greatest and smallest of animal beings, from the elephant to the ant, all point to one great designer—the physico-theological argument of Aristotle.
3. There is no reason for assuming more than one Creator since the world manifests but one plan and order everywhere. Without sufficient cause, no one would ascribe a letter in the same style and handwriting to more than one writer.
4. The assumption of many creators would necessitate either a plurality of identical beings, which, having nothing to distinguish them, could not but be the same—that is, God—or of different beings which, having various qualities and lacking some qualities which others possess, can no longer be infinite and perfect, and therefore must themselves be created, not self-existent.
5. Every plurality, being a combination of units, presupposes an original unity; hence, even those that assume a plurality of gods must logically admit the prior existence of a divine unity—a Neoplatonic argument borrowed by ibn Paquda from the Brethren of Purity.
6. The Creator cannot share accidents and substances with the creatures. Assuming a plurality, an accident and not a substance would lower God, the Creator, to the level of creatures.
7. The assumption of two creators would necessitate insufficiency of either of them or interference of one with the power of the other; and as the limitation deprives the Creator of his power, unity alone establishes divine omnipotence.

Ibn Paquda then endeavours to define God as absolute unity, distinguishing it from all other possible unities. Ibn Paquda's work, in this regard, prompted Yemeni 12th-century Jewish philosopher Natan'el al-Fayyumi to compile a work that counters some of the basic arguments espoused by ibn Paquda; al-Fayyumi argues for a more profound unity of God than that expressed.

=== Attributes of God ===
Adopting his Neoplatonic idea of God as the one who can be only felt by the longing Soul (not grasped by reason), ibn Paquda finds it superfluous to prove the incorporeality of God. The question ibn Paquda poses about God is, how can one know a being so far beyond our mental comprehension that we can not even define him? In answering this, ibn Paquda distinguishes between two kinds of attributes: essential attributes and those derived from activity.

Three attributes of God are essential, though one derives them from Creation:

1. God's existence, since a non-existent being can not create things.
2. God's unity.
3. God's eternity since the last cause of all things is necessarily one and everlasting.

Ibn Paquda holds that these three attributes are one and inseparable from the nature of God; in fact, they are only negative attributes: God cannot be non-existent, or a non-eternal, or a non-unit, or else he is not God.

The second class of attributes, derived from activity, is most frequently applied to God in the Hebrew Bible and equally applies to the creatures and the Creator. These anthropomorphisms, however, whether they speak of God as having human form or as displaying a human-like activity, are used in the Hebrew Bible only to impart knowledge of God to humans who would otherwise not comprehend him in homely language. At the same time, the thinker will gradually divest the Creator of every quality that renders him human-like or similar to any creature. The true essence of God is inaccessible to our understanding, and the Hebrew Bible offers the name of God as a substitute, making it the object of human reverence and the center of ancestral tradition.

Just because the wisest of humans learn to know only their inability to name God adequately, the appellation "God of the Fathers" will strike with peculiar force all people alike. All attempts to express in terms of praise all the qualities of God will necessarily fail. Man's inability to know God parallels his inability to understand his Soul, whose existence is manifested in every one of his acts. Just as each of the five senses has its natural limitations—the sound that is heard by the ear, for instance, not being perceptible to the eye—so human reason has limits regarding the comprehension of God. Insistence on knowing the sun beyond what is possible to the human eye causes blindness in man; so does the insistence on knowing Him who is unknowable, not only through the study of His work but through attempts to ascertain His essence, bewilder and confound the mind, to impair man's reason. To reflect on the greatness and goodness of God, as manifested throughout Creation, is consequently the highest duty of man; and to this is devoted the second section of the book, entitled "Sha'ar ha-Behinah" (Gate of Reflection).

=== His natural philosophy ===
Ibn Paquda points out a sevenfold manifestation of creative wisdom in:

1. The combination of the elements of which the earth forms the center, with water and air surrounding it, and fire placed above
2. the perfection of man as the microcosm
3. The physiology and intellectual faculties of man
4. the order of the animal kingdom
5. that of the plant kingdom
6. the sciences, arts, and industries of man; and
7. the divine revelation as well as the moral and social welfare of all the nations.

Ibn Paquda held that man should think about his wondrous formation to recognize the wisdom of his Maker. Ibn Paquda then surveys the then-understood physiology and psychology of humanity, showing the wisdom displayed in the construction of each organ and of each faculty and disposition of the Soul, as well as in such contrasts as memory and forgetfulness—the latter being as necessary for human peace and enjoyment as the former for his intellectual progress. In nature, likewise, the consideration of the sublimity of the heavens and the motion of all things, the interchange of light and darkness, the variety of colour in the realm of Creation, the awe with which the sight of living man inspires the brute, the extraordinary fertility of each grain of corn in the soil, the ample supply of those elements that are essential to organic life, such as air and water, and the lesser frequency of those things that form the objects of industry and commerce in the shape of nourishment and clothing—all these and similar observations tend to fill man's Soul with gratitude and praise for the providential love and wisdom of the Creator.

=== Worship of God ===
In this view, such understanding necessarily leads man to worship God, to which the third section, "Sha'ar Avodat Elohim" (Gate of Divine Worship), is devoted. Every benefit received by man, says ibn Paquda, will evoke his thankfulness in the same measure as intentions of doing good prompt it, though a portion of self-love be mingled with it, as is the case with what the parent does for his child, which is but part of himself, and upon which his hope for the future is built; still more so with what the master does for his slave, who is his property. Also, charity bestowed by the rich upon the poor is more or less prompted by commiseration, the sight of misfortune causing pain of which the act of charity relieves the giver; likewise, does all helpfulness originate in that feeling of fellowship, which is the consciousness of mutual need. However, God's benefits rest upon love without considering self. On the other hand, no creature is so dependent upon helpful love and mercy as humanity from the cradle to the grave.

=== Pedagogical value of halakha ===
Worship of God in obedience to halakha, Jewish law, is undoubtedly of unmistakable value since it asserts the higher claims of human life against the lower desires awakened and fostered by the animal man. Yet it is not the highest mode of worship, as it may be prompted by fear of divine punishment or a desire for reward, or it may be altogether formal, external, and void of that spirit which steels the Soul against every temptation and trial. Still, Jewish law is necessary as a guide for man, says ibn Paquda, since man tends to lead only a sensual life and indulge in worldly passions. There is another tendency to despise the world of the senses altogether and to devote oneself only to the life of the spirit. In his view, both paths are abnormal and injurious: one is destructive to society, and the other is destructive to human life in both directions. Jewish law, therefore, shows the correct mode of serving God by following "a middle way," like being remote from sensuality and contempt of the world. The mode of worship prescribed by the Law has, therefore, mainly a pedagogical value, asserts ibn Paquda. It educates the whole people, the immature and the mature intellects, for the true service of God, which must be that of the heart. A lengthy dialogue follows between the Soul and the Intellect on Worship and the relation of Free Will to Divine Predestination; ibn Paquda insists on human reason as the supreme ruler of action and inclination, constituting the power of self-determination as man's privilege. Another subject of the dialogue is the physiology and psychology of man, with special regard to the contrasts of joy and grief, fear and hope, fortitude and cowardice, shamefulness and rudeness, anger and mildness, compassion and disrespect, pride and modesty, love and hatred, generosity and miserliness, idleness and industry.

=== Divine providence ===
Trust in God forms the title and the subject of the fourth "gate", "Sha'ar HaBitachon." Greater than the magical power of the alchemist who creates treasures of gold by his art is the power of trust in God, says ibn Paquda; for he alone who confides in God is independent and satisfied with what he has, and enjoys rest and peace without envying anyone. Yet only God, whose wisdom and goodness comprise all times and all circumstances, can be implicitly confided in, or God provides for all His creatures out of true love and with the full knowledge of what is good for each. Particularly, does God provide for man in a manner that unfolds his faculties more and more by new wants and cares, trials and hardships that test and strengthen his powers of body and Soul? Confidence in God, however, should not prevent man from seeking the means of livelihood by pursuing a trade, nor must it lead him to expose his life to perils. Particularly, suicide is a crime often resulting from a lack of confidence in an all-wise Providence. Likewise, is it folly to put too much trust in wealth and those who own great fortunes? All that the world offers will disappoint man in the end; for this reason, the Saints and the Prophets of old often fled their family circles and comfortable homes to lead a life of seclusion devoted solely to God.

=== Immortality of the Soul ===
Ibn Paquda here dwells at length on the hope of immortality, which, in contradistinction to the popular belief in bodily resurrection, he finds intentionally alluded to only here and there in the Scriptures. For ibn Paquda, the belief in immortality is purely spiritual, as expressed in Zech. iii. 7, "I give thee places among these that stand by."

=== Hypocrisy and skepticism ===
Sincerity of purpose is the theme treated in the fifth "gate", called "Yihud ha-Ma'aseh" (Consecration of Action to God); literally, "Unification of Action." According to ibn Paquda, nothing is more repulsive to the pious Soul than the hypocrite. Ibn Paquda regarded skepticism as the chief means of seducing people to Hypocrisy and all other sins. At first, says ibn Paquda, the seducer will cast doubt into man's heart concerning immortality, offering a welcome excuse for sensualism, and, should he fail, he will awaken doubt concerning God and divine worship or revelation. Not succeeding therein, he will endeavour to show the lack of justice in this world and deny the existence of an afterlife; and, finally, he will deny the value of every thought that does not redound to bodily welfare. Therefore, man must exercise continual vigilance regarding the purity of his actions.

=== Humility ===
The sixth "gate," "Sha'ar HaKeni'ah," deals with humility. Humility manifests in gentle conduct toward fellow humans, whether of equal standing or superior, but especially in one's attitude toward God. Humility springs from a consideration of the low origin of man, the vicissitudes of life, and one's failings and shortcomings compared with the duties of man and the greatness of God so that all pride, even regarding one's merits, is banished. Pride in outward possessions is incompatible with humility and must be suppressed; pride is still more so derived from the humiliation of others. However, pride stimulates nobler ambitions, such as the pride of acquiring knowledge or achieving good: this is compatible with humility and may enhance it.

=== Repentance ===
The book's practical tendency is particularly evident in the seventh section, Shaar HaTeshuvah, the Gate of Repentance. The majority, even of the pious, ibn Paquda says, are not those who have been free from sins but have once sinned and felt regret. As there are sins, both omission and commission, man's repentance should be directed to stimulate good action where such had been neglected or to train him to abstain from evil desires that had led to evil actions.

Repentance consists of:

1. the full consciousness of the shameful act and profound regret for having committed it;
2. a determination of change of conduct;
3. a candid confession of the sin, and an earnest supplication to God asking His pardon;
4. in a perfect change of heart.

True repentance shows itself in awe of God's justice, in contrition of Soul, in tears, in outward signs of grief — such as moderation of sensual enjoyment and display, and foregoing pleasures otherwise legitimate preceding a humble, prayerful spirit and an earnest contemplation of the Soul's future. Most essential is the discontinuance of sinful habits, because the longer they are adhered to, the more difficult they are to end. Procrastination hinders repentance, which waits for a tomorrow that may never come. After having quoted the sayings of the rabbis to the effect that the sinner who repents may rank higher than he who has never sinned, ibn Paquda quotes the words of one of the masters to his disciples: "Were you altogether free from sin, I should be afraid of what is far greater than sin — that is, pride and hypocrisy."

=== Seeing God ===
The following "gate", entitled Shaar Heshbon HaNefesh, Gate of Self-Examination, contains an appeal to take as serious view as possible of life, its obligations and opportunities for the Soul's perfection to attain to a state of purity in which is unfolded the higher faculty of the Soul, which beholds the deeper mysteries of God, the sublime wisdom and beauty of a higher world inaccessible to other men. Ibn Paquda devotes Shaar HaPerishut, Gate of Seclusion from the World, to the relationship between true religiousness and asceticism. According to ibn Paquda, some abstinence is necessary to curb man's passion and turn the Soul toward its higher destiny. Still, human life requires cultivating a world that God has formed for habitation and the perpetuation of the race. As such, asceticism can only be the virtue of a few who stand forth as exemplars.

=== An ascetic life ===
There are different modes of seclusion from the world. Some want to lead a life devoted to the higher world, flee this world altogether, and live as hermits, contrary to the design of the Creator. Others retire from the world's turmoil and live secluded in their homes. A third class, which comes nearest to the precepts of Jewish law, participates in the world's struggles and pursuits but leads a life of abstinence and moderation, regarding this world as a preparation for a higher one. According to ibn Paquda, the object of religious practice is the exercise of self-control, curbing passion, and placing at the service of the Most High all personal possessions and all the organs of life.

=== Love of God ===
The aim of ethical self-discipline is the love of God, which forms the contents of the tenth and last section of the work, Shaar Ahavat Elohim, The Gate of the Love of God. This is explained as the soul's longing, amid all the attractions and enjoyments that bind it to the earth, for the fountain of its life, in which it finds joy and peace, even though the greatest pains and suffering are imposed on it. Those imbued with this love find every sacrifice they are asked to make for their God easy, and no selfish motive mars the purity of their love. Ibn Paquda is not so one-sided as to recommend the practice of the recluse, who has at heart only the welfare of his Soul. A man may be as holy as an angel, yet he will not equal in merit the one who leads his fellow to righteousness and to love of God.

== Translations ==
Besides the Hebrew translations mentioned above, Chovot HaLevavot has been translated into several languages.

=== Judaeo-Spanish ===
- Chovot HaLevavot, translated into Judaeo-Spanish by Zaddik ben Joseph Formon before the end of the sixteenth century, was printed at Constantinople, and republished several times (Amsterdam, 1610 by David Pardo in Latin characters; Venice, 1713 in Hebrew characters; Vienna, 1822 by Isaac Bellagrade). Julius Fürst ("Bibliotheca Judaica" i. 78, iii. 67) attributes the translation to Joseph Pardo, rabbi of Amsterdam.

=== Latin ===
- Jacob Roman of Constantinople intended to publish the Arabic text with a Latin translation in 1643.

=== Portuguese ===
- Amsterdam, 1670, by Samuel b. Isaac Abbas.

=== German ===
- Amsterdam, 1716, by Isaac b. Moses .
- Fürth, 1765, by Samuel Posen.
- Breslau, 1836.
- Vienna, 1854, by Mendel Baumgarten.
- Vienna, 1856, by Mendel E. Stern.

=== Italian ===
- An Italian translation was published in 1847.

=== English ===
- Hyamson, Moses. Duties of the Heart. Feldheim Publishers: Jerusalem — New York, 1970 (2-volume edition). Originally published in 5 volumes (1925-1947). Translation from Judah ibn Tibbon's Hebrew translation.
- Mansoor, Menahem. The Book of Direction to the Duties of the Heart. The Littman Library of Jewish Civilization. London: Routledge & Kegan Paul, 1973. Translation from the Arabic.
- Haberman, Daniel. Duties of the Heart. Feldheim Publishers: Jerusalem — New York, 1996 (2-volume set). Translation based on Yehudah ibn Tibbon's Hebrew translation, though with consultation of Kafih (Hebrew) and Mansoor (English) translations from the Arabic.
- Gateoftrust.org - English translation of Duties of the Heart.
