= Samuel ben Isaac ha-Sardi =

13th-century Spanish rabbi

Samuel ben Isaac Ha-Sardi (Hebrew: שמואל בן יצחק סרדי) was a Spanish rabbi who flourished in the first half of the 13th century. In his youth he attended the school of Rabbi Nathan ben Meir of Trinquetaille, Provence, and later he returned to Spain, his native country. David Conforte (Ḳore ha-Dorot, p. 20a) derives the name "Sardi" from the city of Sardinia. Zacuto (Yuḥasin, ed. Filipowski, p. 221a) calls Samuel "Ha-Sefaradi"; so does Heilprin in Seder ha-Dorot, i.216b, 292a in the Warsaw edition of 1883, but in iii.108b of the Warsaw edition of 1882 he designates him "Ha-Sardi."

Samuel was a contemporary of Nahmanides, whom he consulted on Talmudical questions. Solomon ben Abraham of Montpellier, who in his implacable hatred of philosophy denounced the works of Maimonides and appealed to the Inquisition to burn them, wrote a letter to Samuel in which he speaks highly of his learning and reminds him of their friendly relations in their youth. This letter, one of the many that Solomon addressed to French and Spanish rabbis against Maimonides, was published by Solomon Joachim Halberstam in Kobak's Jeschurun, viii.98.

Samuel wrote in 1225: Sefer ha-Terumot (ספר התרומות, sometimes abbreviated סה"ת) Salonica, 1596 and 1628; Prague, 1605, with Azaria Piccio's commentary Giddule truma, Venice, 1643), novellæ on the civil laws of the Talmud, divided into "she'arim" (gates) and "peraḳim" (chapters). In the preface the author mentions another work written by him, Sefer ha-Zikronot, on the arrangement of the tractates and chapters of the Mishnah; but it was not printed, and the manuscript is no longer extant.

== Jewish Encyclopedia bibliography ==
- Azulai, Shem ha-Gedolim, i.124b, No. 129; ii.115b, No. 98, Warsaw, 1876;
- Isaac Benjacob, Oẓar ha-Sefarim, p. 673, No. 978;
- Frankel, Der Gerichtliche Beweis, p. 111;
- Henri Gross, Gallia Judaica, p. 326;
- Heimann Joseph Michael, Or ha-Ḥayyim, No. 1208;
- Moritz Steinschneider, Cat. Bodl. col. 2476.
