= Vauvert =

- Commune
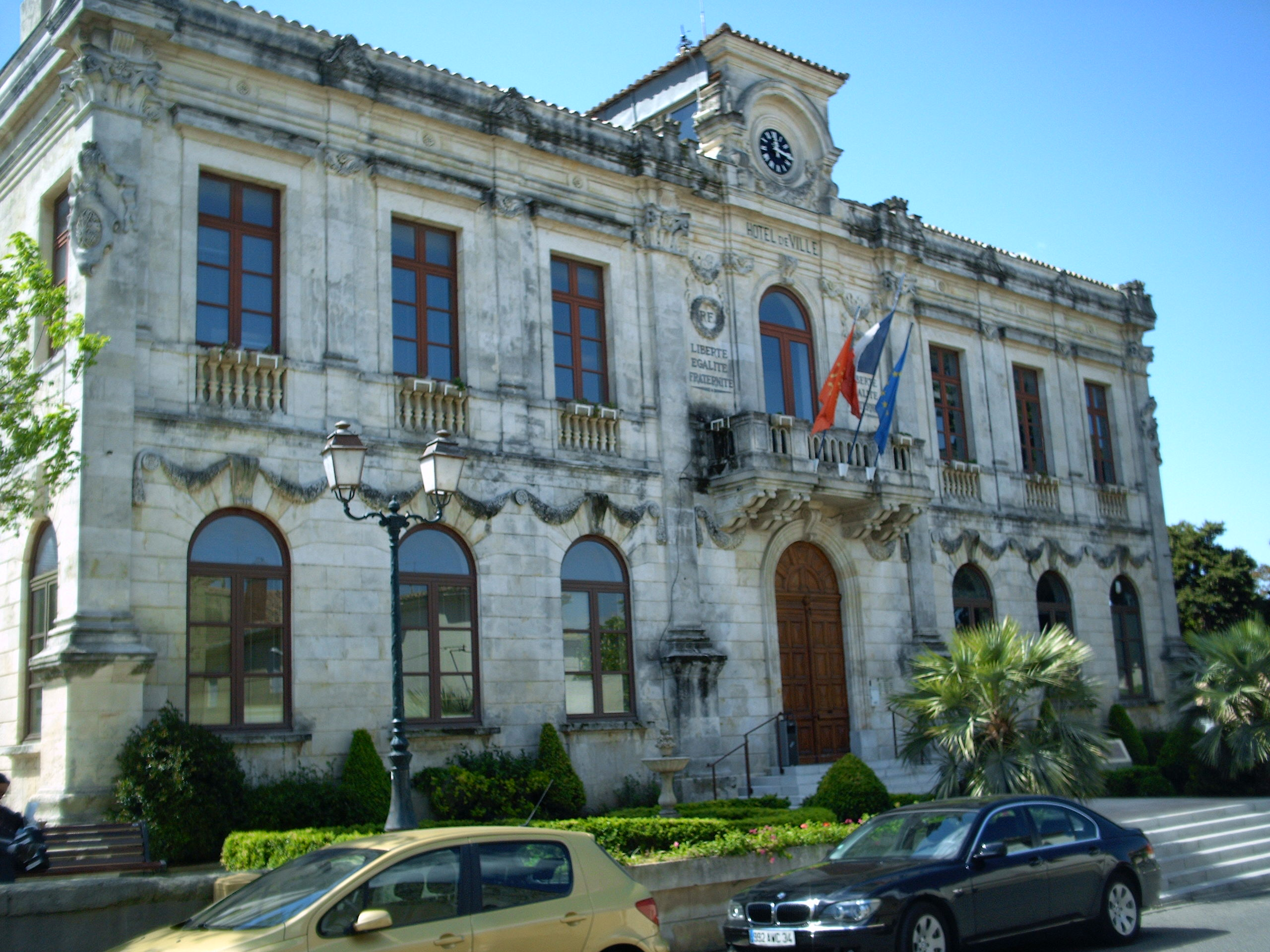
- Vauvert town hall

- Coat of arms
- Location of Vauvert
- Location within France Location within Occitanie
- Coordinates: 43°41′39″N 4°16′37″E
- Country: France
- Region: Occitania
- Department: Gard
- Arrondissement: Nîmes
- Canton: Vauvert
- Intercommunality: CC Petite-Camargue

Government
  - Mayor (2020–2026): Jean Denat
- Area^{1}: 109.86 km^{2} (42.42 sq mi)
- Elevation: 18 m (59 ft)
- Highest elevation: 97 m (318 ft)
- Lowest elevation: 0 m (0 ft)
- Population (2023): 11,671
  - Density: 106.24/km^{2} (275.15/sq mi)
- Time zone: UTC+01:00 (CET)
  - Summer (DST): UTC+02:00 (CEST)
- INSEE/Postal code: 30341 /30600
- ^{1} French Land Register data, which excludes lakes, ponds, glaciers > 1 km^{2} (0.386 sq mi or 247 acres) and river estuaries.

Vauvert (French pronunciation: [vovɛʁ]; Occitan: Vauverd) is a commune in the far south of the Gard department in southern France. It was known as Posquières in the Middle Ages. The commune comprises the town of Vauvert and the villages of Gallician and Montcalm. Over a third of the population work in industry, which is largely the food industry, especially wine production. The original settlement was called Posquières and was first mentioned in a document of 810. Since then the town has increased in importance and has had a rich history. At its heyday in the mid-nineteenth century it had a population of 6,000 but this decreased by a third after disease struck the grape crop, the mainstay of the economy of the area. Today, the population has grown again to over 11,000.

Leimistin Broussan, opera manager, was born in Vauvert on 3 November 1858.

== History ==
Vauvert is first mentioned as the fief of Posquières (meaning "place of wells") when it was donated by Raymond Raphiel to Saint-Thibéry Abbey in 810. In the Middle Ages, a little village grew up around the frequently besieged castle on top of the Motte-Foussat, now known as Castellas. The Christians and the Jews created two separate communities in the village. In the 12th century, the rabbinical school was an important centre of Jewish teaching, recognized across Europe thanks to the contributions of Abraham ben David and Isaac the Blind. From the 13th century, the Christian sanctuary Notre-Dame du Val-Vert, just outside the village, gained increasing importance when it was visited by Louis IX, Charles IX, Francis I and Pope Clement V. As a result, in the 14th century the name of the village was changed to Vauvert. In 1540, the sanctuary was destroyed by the Protestants. The town was considered strategically important by Montmorency in his campaign of 1627 during the reign of Louis XIII. After the revocation of the Edict of Nantes, the Protestant church, Temple Vielh, was destroyed in 1685 and the Catholic church was rebuilt and consecrated in 1689.

From the Middle Ages, the inhabitants of Posquières-Vauvert enjoyed special rights to hunting, fishing, grazing and agriculture which had been granted by the barons. They are all listed in a document from 1299. Over the centuries, the hills known as "Costière" were increasingly acquired by the villagers from the barons, especially after the French Revolution. There they developed vineyards and wineries which became the major source of income during the Second Empire in the mid-18th century, resulting in an increase in population to some 6,000. The prosperity was however short-lived as the vines suffered when phylloxera hit the region at the beginning of the 19th century. The population was reduced to around 4,000 and did not start to grow again until the 1950s when people were attracted by new opportunities in livestock rearing, vineyards and the food processing industry.

== Geography ==
Vauvert occupies about 11 square kilometres (4.2 sq mi) and is one of the largest municipalities in the Camargue. It extends for about 20 kilometres (12 mi) in a north–south direction and 3 to 6 kilometres (1.9 to 3.7 mi) in an east–west direction. The northern half is generally dry while the southern half is marshy. Located in the flatlands of La Petite Camargue in Languedoc-Rousillon, Vauvert is some 22 km (14 mi) southwest of Nîmes, 35 km (22 mi) west of Arles and 44 km (27 mi) east of Montpellier. It is easily accessible by the Autoroute A9 or by rail on the line from Nîmes to Le Grau-du-Roi from Vauvert station. The Mediterranean beaches to the southwest can be reached in about half an hour.

Vauvert is typical of the historic towns in the area. To the north it is bordered by vineyards, pine forests and orchards, and to the south by further vineyards, rice fields, ponds and marshes. The town itself consists of a 17th-century Catholic church, a belfry, and narrow streets with houses mainly from the 18th and 19th centuries. The economy of the area is based on the production of wine with several vineyards in the vicinity, and the town also has an industrial zone. A new enterprise which has opened in 2013 is a community garage supported by the social services. It is specially designed to help those receiving social support who are unable to pay the high rates normally charged for repairs. In addition to savings of up to 40% on parts, customers can reduce costs by handling some of the repair work themselves. They are also able to pay bills in several more manageable instalments.

== Landmarks ==
Vauvert has a number of historic landmarks.

The Panapée Gate formed part of the town's medieval fortifications but is now crowned by the clock tower and belfry which were restored in 1849.

The Protestant church "Le Grand Temple" (1811) was designed by Charles Durand in the Neoclassical style to satisfy the needs of the local Protestant community which represented three-quarters of the population. It is now a listed monument.

Notre Dame Church, which has a history going back to 810 when a sanctuary became one of the oldest stone-built places of worship in the Diocese of Nîmes. It was destroyed in the 16th century but today's 17th-century church commemorates its history with a stained-glass window showing Louis IX praying before the statue of Notre Dame.

The town hall reflects the prosperity the town enjoyed as a result of its successful wineries. It was completed in 1859.

The Jean Brunel Arena is Vauvert's fourth bullring. With seating for 3,300, it was inaugurated in 2004. It is the centre of the town's traditional festivities especially around the Ascension weekend.

== Population ==
Historical population
Year	Pop.	±% p.a.
1968	6,345	—
1975	7,472	+2.36%
1982	9,103	+2.86%
1990	10,296	+1.55%
1999	10,261	−0.04%
2007	11,138	+1.03%
2012	11,261	+0.22%
2017	11,608	+0.61%
2023	11,671	+0.09%
Source: INSEE

== See also ==
- Communes of the Gard department
- Costières de Nîmes AOC

== Bibliography ==
- Prosper Falgairolle (2007). Histoire civile, religieuse et hospitalière de la ville de Vauvert du Xe siècle à l'année 1790: d'après les documents originaux (in French). Livre d'Histoire. ISBN 978-2-7586-0024-4. (First published 1918)
- I. Sausse-Villiers (1991). Histoire de Vauvert (in French). Office d'édition du livre d'histoire. ISBN 978-2-87760-562-5.
