= Lunel, Hérault =

Lunel
- Commune
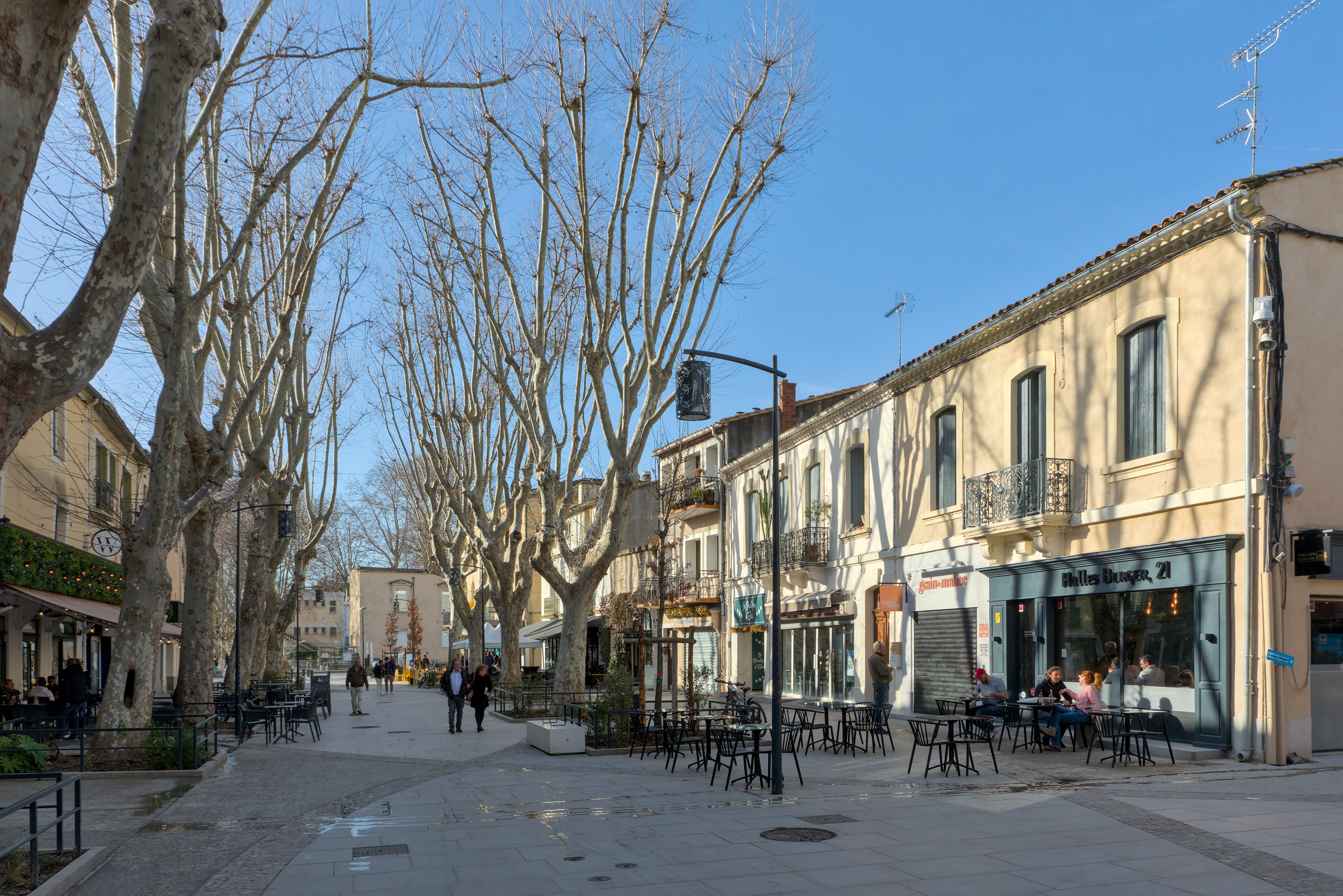
- Cours Gabriel Péri, a large street with cafés and shops in the town center.

- Coat of arms
- Location of Lunel
- Location within France Location within Occitanie
- Coordinates: 43°40′40″N 4°08′10″E
- Country: France
- Region: Occitania
- Department: Hérault
- Arrondissement: Montpellier
- Canton: Lunel
- Intercommunality: CA Lunel Agglo

Government
  - Mayor (2026–32): Paulette Gougeon
- Area^{1}: 23.90 km^{2} (9.23 sq mi)
- Highest elevation: 53 m (174 ft)
- Lowest elevation: 2 m (6.6 ft)
- Population (2023): 26,623
  - Density: 1,114/km^{2} (2,885/sq mi)
- Time zone: UTC+01:00 (CET)
  - Summer (DST): UTC+02:00 (CEST)
- INSEE/Postal code: 34145 /34400
- ^{1} French Land Register data, which excludes lakes, ponds, glaciers > 1 km^{2} (0.386 sq mi or 247 acres) and river estuaries.

Lunel (French pronunciation: [lynɛl]; Provençal: Lunèl) is a commune in the Hérault department in southern France. Lunel is located 21 km (13 mi) east of Montpellier and 28 km (17 mi) southwest of Nîmes (Gard). Lunel station has rail connections to Narbonne, Montpellier, Nîmes and Avignon.

== History ==
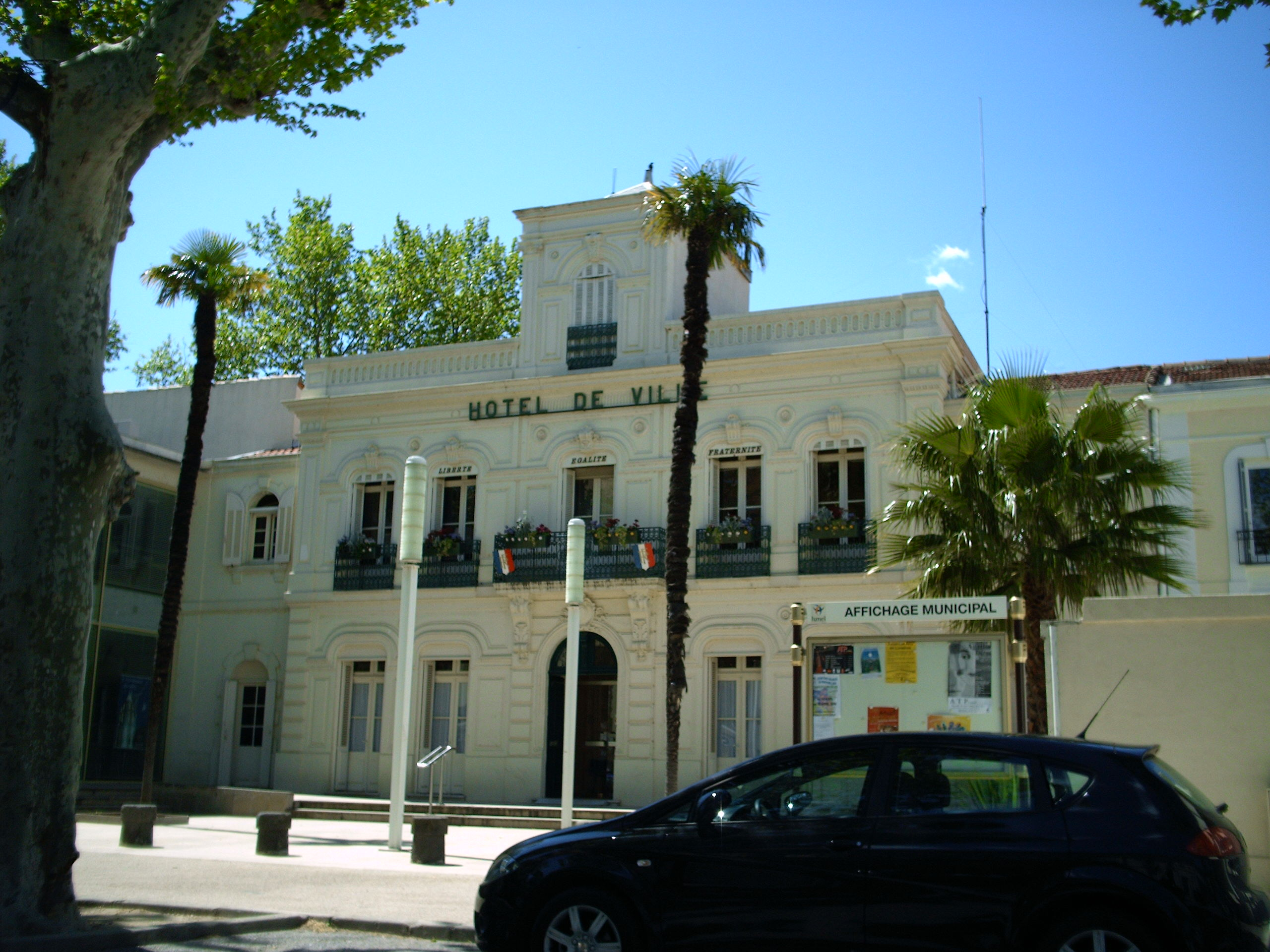
The Hôtel de Ville

The ancient Roman site of Ambrussum is located nearby. The troubadour Folquet de Lunel was from Lunel.

According to legend, Lunel was founded by Jews from Jericho in the first century. It had a Jewish population by the first millennium, and an ancient synagogue is located there. Lunel was a centre of Jewish learning. It is thought that the family of Rashi (1040–1105) originated in Lunel. Other scholars include Jonathan of Lunel, Meshullam ben Jacob of Lunel, his son Aaron ben Meshullam ben Jacob of Lunel, Abraham ben David who taught in Lunel before moving to Posquières, Abraham ben Nathan, and Asher ben Meshullam of Lunel.

Lunel was the birthplace of Louis Feuillade (1873–1925), film director from the silent era. The artist Jean Hugo (1894-1984) lived in the Lunel area for most of his life and painted scenes from the surrounding countryside. The Parc Jean Hugo in the centre of the town was named after him.

The Hôtel de Ville is former townhouse which was acquired and remodelled by the town council after the Second World War.

Since the 20th century, the town has been a destination for Muslim immigrants from Algeria and other parts of North Africa. In 2015 the New York Times reported that 10% of all the French nationals killed fighting in Syria for ISIS came from Lunel.

== Population ==
Historical population

Year	Pop.	±% p.a.
1793	4,170	—
1800	4,227	+0.19%
1806	4,196	−0.12%
1821	5,554	+1.89%
1831	6,260	+1.20%
1836	6,320	+0.19%
1841	6,385	+0.20%
1846	6,639	+0.78%
1851	6,392	−0.76%
1856	6,712	+0.98%
1861	6,737	+0.07%
1866	6,989	+0.74%
1872	7,281	+0.68%
1876	8,315	+3.38%
1881	6,487	−4.84%
1886	6,667	+0.55%
1891	6,793	+0.38%
1896	7,203	+1.18%
1901	7,532	+0.90%

Year	Pop.	±% p.a.
1906	7,489	−0.11%
1911	7,730	+0.64%
1921	7,539	−0.25%
1926	8,268	+1.86%
1931	8,435	+0.40%
1936	7,665	−1.90%
1946	7,775	+0.14%
1954	7,758	−0.03%
1962	8,872	+1.69%
1968	10,735	+3.23%
1975	13,452	+3.28%
1982	15,648	+2.18%
1990	18,404	+2.05%
1999	22,352	+2.18%
2007	24,044	+0.92%
2012	25,405	+1.11%
2017	26,239	+0.65%
2023	26,623	+0.24%

Source: EHESS and INSEE (1968-2023)

== See also ==
- Hachmei Provence
- Communes of the Hérault department
