= Kiddush levana =

Jewish ritual and prayer service

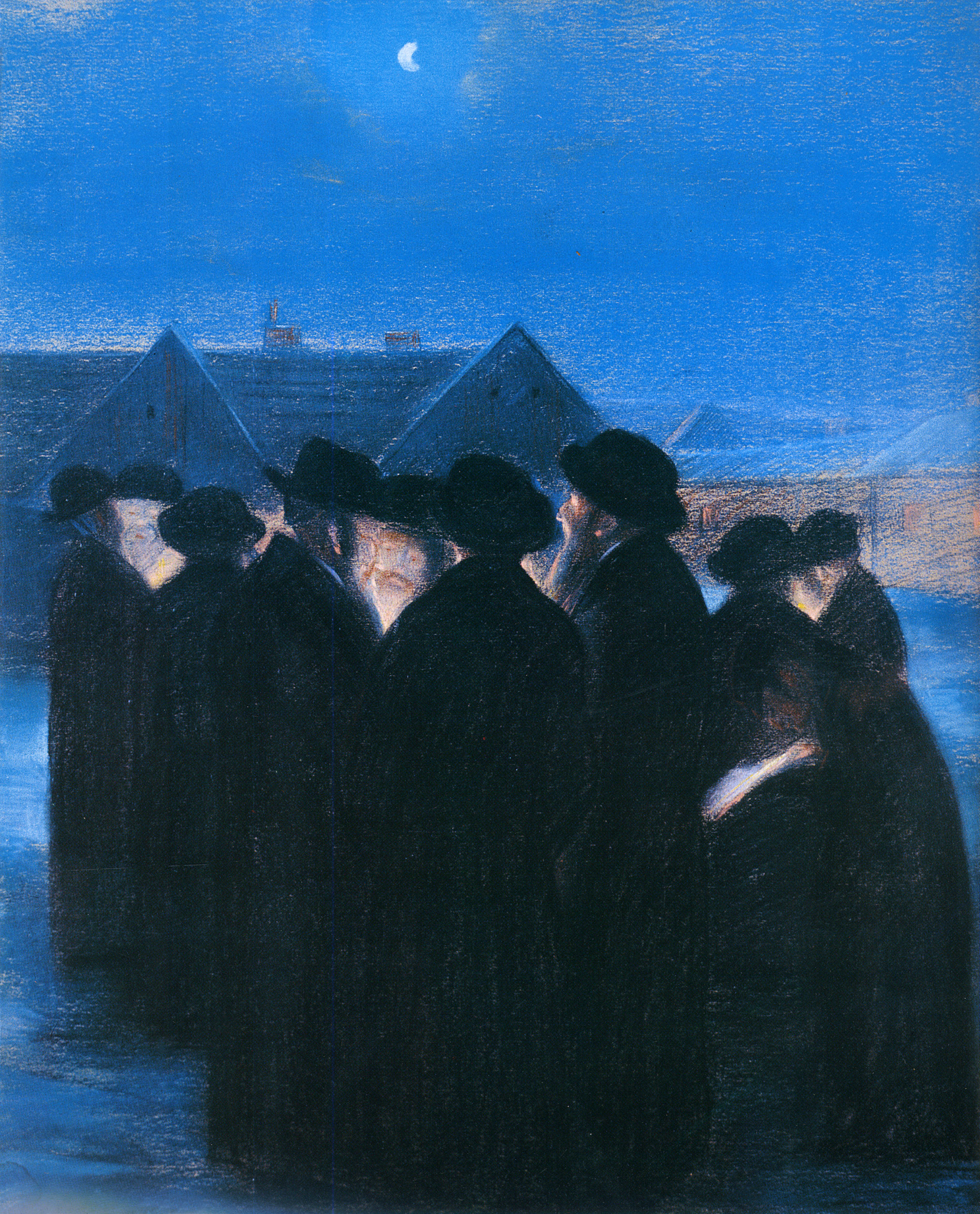
- As depicted by Artur Markowicz (1933)

Halakhic texts relating to this article
- Babylonian Talmud: Sanhedrin 41b–42a
- Jerusalem Talmud: Berakhot 9:2
- Mishneh Torah: Laws of Blessings 10:16–17
- Shulchan Aruch: Orach Chaim 426
- Other rabbinic codes: Halakhot Gedolot 1:135 Or Zarua II 456 Sefer Mitzvot Gadol Asin 27 Arba'ah Turim OC 426 Shibbolei Haleket 167:4 Kol Bo 43:14

Kiddush levana, also known as Birkat halevana, (Note: Hebrew: קידוש לבנה, romanized: qidduš ləḇānā, lit. 'Sanctification of the Moon' and Hebrew: ברכת הלבנה, romanized: birkath haləḇānā, lit. 'Blessing of the Moon'. Also called Kiddush hachodesh (קידוש החודש), Birkat hachodesh (ברכת החודש), and Birkat hayare'ach (ברכת הירח). Today, Birkat hachodesh more often refers to the announcement of the molad on the previous Shabbat morning. Romaniote Jews referred to this other ceremony as Kiddush Yarcha, and Eliezer of Worms, too, refers to it as mekadeshim hahodesh. Medievals debate the relationship between announcing the molad and the original Kiddush hahodesh, the Sanhedrin's declaration of the New Moon. According to Baruch Epstein, who prefers Birkat hiddush levana, the announcement of the molad was originally intended to help worshippers recite Kiddush levana at the right time.) is a Jewish ritual and prayer service, generally observed on the first or second Saturday night of each Hebrew month. The service includes a blessing to God for the appearance of the new moon and further readings depending on custom. In most communities, ritual elements include the shalom aleikhem greeting and jumping toward the moon, with some also incorporating kabbalistic practices.

The oldest part of Kiddush levana, the blessing, is described by the Talmud. Other elements were introduced by Massechet Soferim in the 8th century, although their ultimate origin is obscure. In the years since, different Jewish communities have incorporated various quotations from the Bible and Talmud, liturgical compositions, and mystical customs into their version of the ritual. In the Ashkenazic rite it is an individual recitation, but a cantor may lead in Mizrahi communities. In Orthodox Judaism, it is almost exclusively reserved for men, but non-Orthodox Kiddush levana may involve men, women, or both.

Kiddush levana has featured in popular artwork, poems, jokes, stories, and folklore. Tunes based on its liturgy, especially "David Melekh Yisrael Hai veKayyam" and "Siman Tov uMazel Tov Yehei Lanu ulkhol Yisrael", have spread far beyond the original ritual. Marcia Falk has called it Judaism's most "colorful and intriguing" liturgy, while to Shai Secunda it is "one of the most peculiar and mysterious".

Since the 15th century, Kiddush levana has been "a highly visible target for rationalist critiques, both Jewish and non-Jewish". Generations of the Authorised Daily Prayer Book expurgated all ritual elements, and some other 20th-century prayerbooks ignored it entirely. By the 1970s, it was widely described as defunct, although it soon began to regain Orthodox popularity. In 1992, Chabad announced a campaign to popularize its observance.

As of 2024, Kiddush levana is included with ritual elements in all mainstream Orthodox prayerbooks, including recent editions of the Authorised Daily Prayer Book. It is endorsed by Conservative Judaism, Reconstructionist Judaism, and Jewish Renewal. Although Kiddush levana remains controversial within Reform Judaism, it has recently been endorsed by Dalia Marx, Sylvia Rothschild, and other Reform leaders. Since 1976, many non-Orthodox women's groups have adopted Kiddush levana, and non-Orthodox masculine versions began appearing circa 1993. The ritual has been adapted for use in same-sex weddings, coming-out ceremonies, Brit bats, and the 2024 solar eclipse. It continues to evolve.

== Development ==
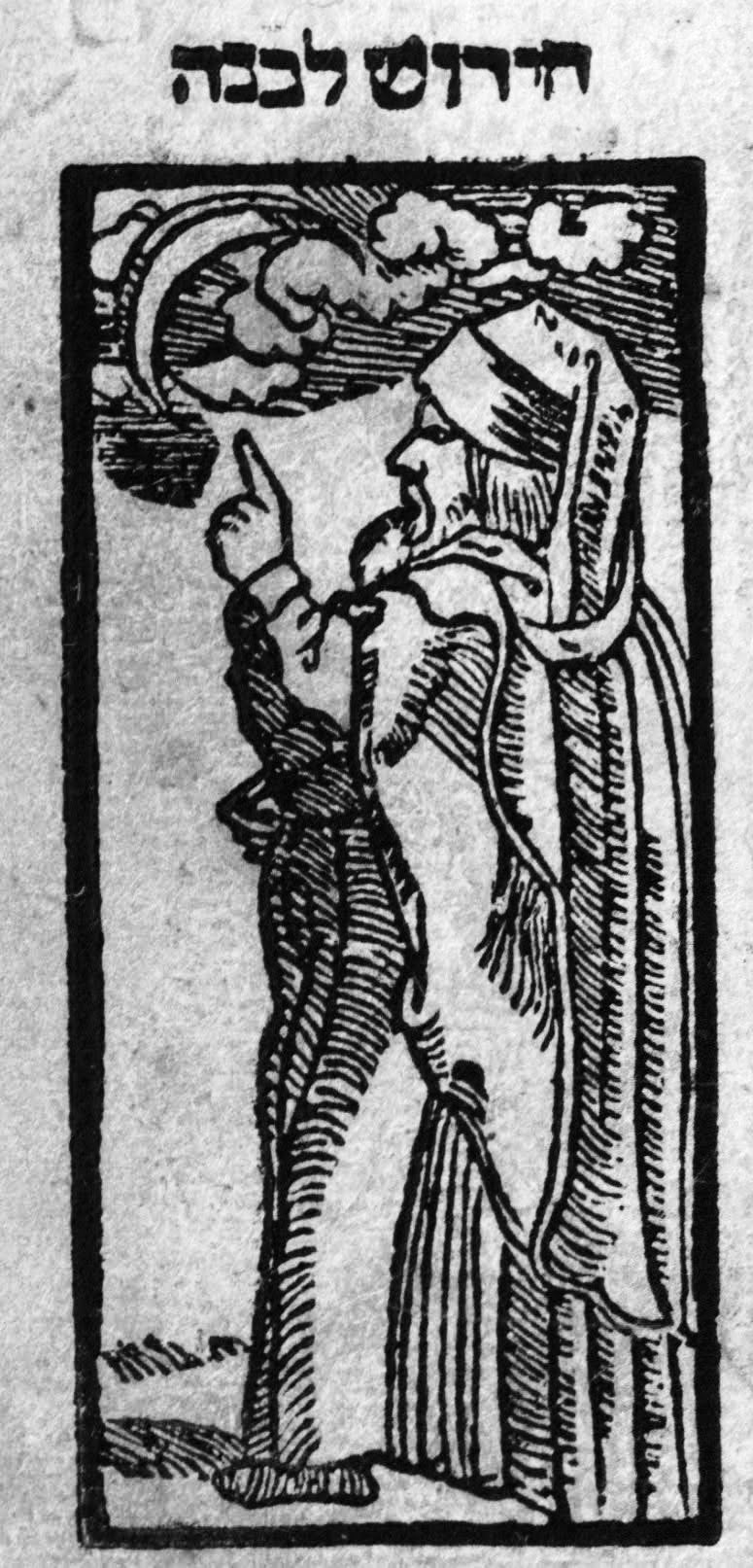
A woodcut in the Prague Haggadah (1526) shows a new moon ritual. (Note: See Sperber, Daniel (1990). "Bedikat hatzel le-or hayareiach beleil Hoshana rabbah". Minhagei Yisrael (in Hebrew). Vol. 6. Mosad Harav Kook. pp. 179–180 n. 24. Retrieved January 22, 2025 - via Otzar. Compare discussion of a similar image (1589) in MS Nuremberg Oct. Hs. 7058 at Feuchtwanger-Sarig, Naomi (2021). Thy Father's Instruction. p. 207.)

The Talmud includes many blessings for the occasion of observing natural phenomena, but only the blessing over the moon has expanded into an elaborate service. Kiddush levana is generally understood to have resulted from the special importance provided to the moon by the rituals associated with declaring a new calendar month, which date back at least to the Second Temple period. Some scholars say that Kiddush levana evolved under their influence, while others say it was intended to replace these rituals, abandoned after the Hebrew calendar was fixed in the 4th century.

A few argue that it was originally a device for secret communication during the Bar Kokhba revolt, but this is unlikely given its late date. According to Julius Eisenstein, Kiddush levana was instituted by the rabbis to comfort their flock in a time of oppression, as a protection against any harm that might come to them in that month. According to Leon Mandelshtam, it was intended as a substitute for regular observances in times of oppression, and maintained especially for marranos. Others say that it was instituted to protest Zoroastrian moon-worship or the Karaite calendar. Avram Arian calls it "primarily a redemptive rite", and Israel Zolli sees it as mostly penitential.

However, many other scholars ascribe Kiddush levana a pagan origin. According to Jacob Reifmann, it was originally a magical practice to protect Jews from eclipses; Israel Drazin explains it as resulting from "ancient superstitious fear that the new moon might not return to its original fullness due to satanic interference". Others say it was borrowed from Zoroastrianism. Arthur A. Feldman traces it to worship of Astarte, George Margoulioth and David Sidersky, to Sin, Abraham Danon, to Ishtar, and Gerda Barag, to "the cult of the Mother-Goddess", while M. H. Segal, Theodor Reik, and Gnana Robinson argue that it was originally a form of moon-worship. Siegfried Passarge thought it had evolved from a fertility rite.

=== Talmudic blessing ===
The oldest part of the Kiddush levana ritual is the blessing. The Talmud describes both men and women reciting a special blessing when they see the new moon, recording several different liturgies and attributing them to 2nd and 3rd-century sages. According to Arian, the early attributions are false. The oldest form was a simple "Blessed be the Creator", but in time the version attributed to Judah bar Ezekiel (220–299) became canonical:

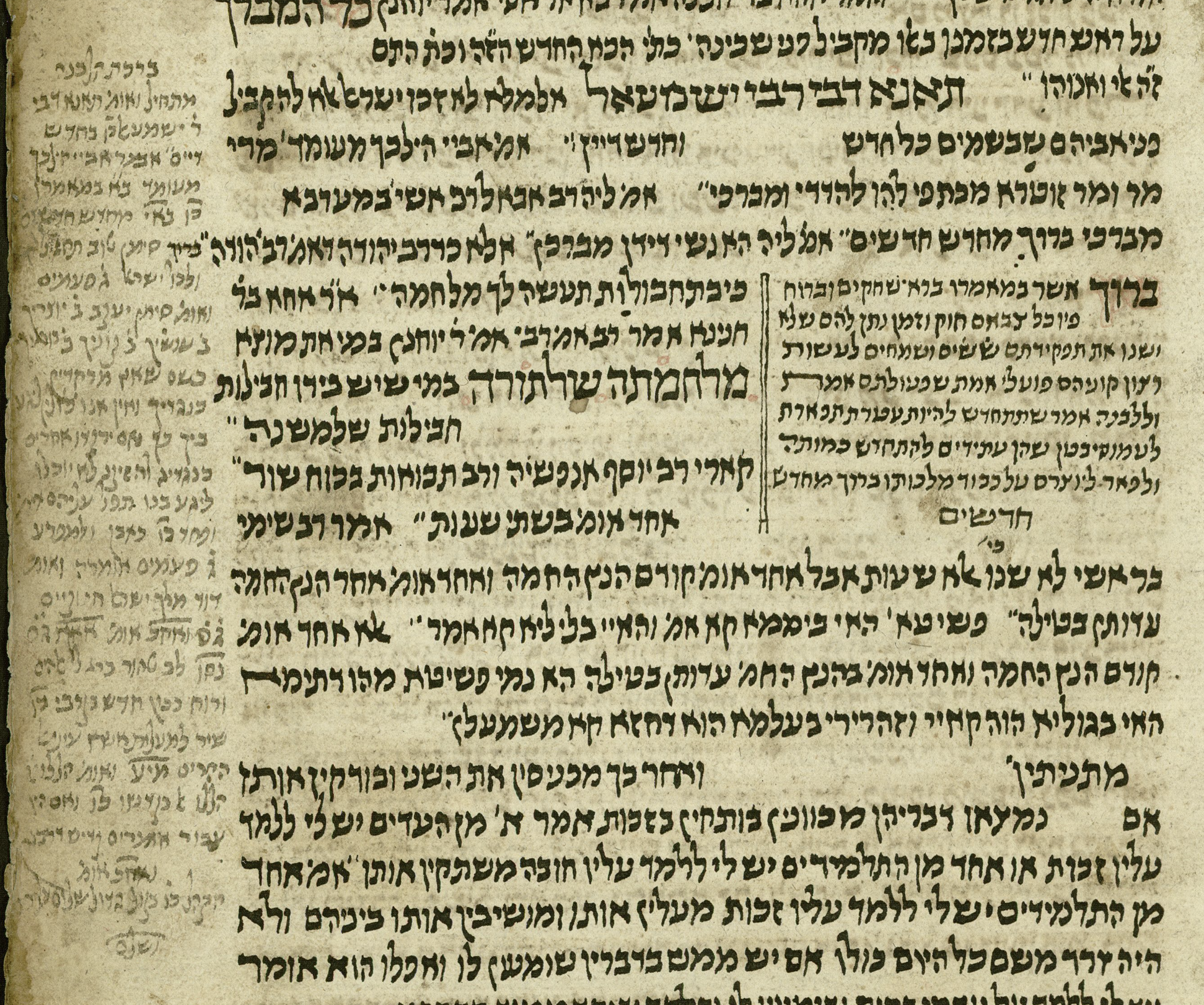
The blessing in MS Yad HaRav Herzog 1, a 16th-century Talmudic manuscript from Yemen which claims to reflect an 8th-century version. A modern Kiddush levana liturgy has been added in the margin.

Blessed art thou, Lord our God, King of the universe, who didst create the heavens by thy command, and all their host by thy mere word. Thou hast subjected them to fixed laws and time, so that they might not deviate from their set function. They are glad and happy to do the will of their Creator, the true Author, whose achievement is truth. He ordered the moon to renew itself as a glorious crown over those he sustained from birth, who likewise will be regenerated in the future, and will worship their Creator for his glorious majesty. Blessed art thou, O Lord, who renewst the months.

Johanan bar Nappaha (d. 279) attempted to upgrade its status by comparing it to "welcoming the shekhinah". Abaye (d. 337) taught that the blessing should be recited while standing upright, (Note: However, at least some Sephardic Jews of Ferrara would recite it while sitting in an alley. See Lampronti, Isaac (1750). Pahad Yitzhak. Vol. 1. f. 56v. Retrieved August 11, 2025 - via Google Books. These may have been Kabbalists, according to Malkiel, David (2006). "The Burden of the Past in the Eighteenth Century: Authority, Custom and Innovation in the Pahad Yitzhak". The Jewish Law Annual. 16: 127. Ibid. (2022). Isaac's Fear. pp. 97-98. See also the 1786–1800 engraving by Giovanni Maria de Pian, below in §Gallery, which depicts a similar scene.) but Maremar and Mar Zutra (d. 417) would recite it while being carried.

In the Talmud, the blessing for the new moon is one of many recommended for the occasion of observing a natural wonder; liturgies are also given to mark the full moon, (Note: Hebrew: לבנה בגבורתה, romanized: lǝbānâ bigbûrātāh, perhaps lit. "the moon in its strength". See Lieberman, Saul (2001) [1954]. Tosefta kefshuta, t. Berakhot 6:6. Retrieved March 20, 2025 - Sefaria. Also interpreted as "the full moon" by Schwarz, Jacob D. (1906). The New Moon Benediction. Hebrew Union College (Thesis). pp. 3–4. Retrieved January 22, 2025 - via HUC Library. Bialik, Hayim Nahman (1929). Sefer ha-aggada (in Hebrew). Vol. 4. Devir. p. 420. Rabinowitz, Zev Wolf. "Sha'arei Torat Eretz Yisrael (1940) on Jerusalem Talmud Berakhot 9:2:13:1". Sefaria. Ginzberg, Louis (1941). Perushim vehiddushim beyerushalmi. Vol. 1. p. 24 n. 28. Gandz, Solomon (1954). "The Benediction over the Luminaries and the Stars". The Jewish Quarterly Review. 44 (4), p. 307, JSTOR 1452803 (subscription required). Retrieved February 16, 2025 - via JSTOR. Zeitlin, Solomon (1957). Review of The Tosefta, by S. Lieberman. The Jewish Quarterly Review. 47 (4), p. 397. JSTOR 1453106 (subscription required). Retrieved February 16, 2025 - via JSTOR. Reimund, Leicht (2011). "The Beginnings of Jewish Astrology". Continuity and Innovation in the Magical Tradition. p. 281. But compare Roth, Abraham Naftali Zvi (1967). "Kiddush levana" (in Hebrew). Yeda Am. Vol. 12 [misprinted 13]. p. 4, who follows an alternate religious interpretation.) thunder, lightning, rainbows, mountains, and the changing of the seasons. Some Orthodox halakhists maintain that this blessing should be recited immediately upon seeing the new moon for the first time. However, in general practice the blessing has been uprooted from this context and remade into a special ritual.

=== Soferim ritual ===
Massechet Soferim (c. 775) is the first text to describe a complex ritual, to be exclusively performed "at the conclusion of the Sabbath, when perfumed and beautifully attired". According to Soferim,

One looks toward the moon (Note: Originally the entire service was recited while facing the moon. 16th-century Kabbalists considered the moon too holy to be observed and revived Meir Abulafia's thirteenth-century injunction against looking at it, only allowing even one reciting Kiddush levana to look at the moon for a moment before beginning the service. Roth, Abraham Naftali Zvi (1967). "Kiddush levana" (in Hebrew). Yeda Am. Vol. 12 [misprinted 13]. pp. 4–5. Later authorities also justified this change as lessening the appearance of idolatry; see e.g. Benamozegh, Elia (1914). Israël et l'humanité. pp. 208. Baadani, Netanel (2012). Friedman, Shamma (ed.). Hayu Bodeqin (in Hebrew). p. 133. Retrieved January 22, 2025 - via HaIggud leFarshanut haTalmud. On the promulgation of this ban, see also Ta-Shma, Israel (1968). "Yetzirato hasifrutit shel R. Meir Abulafia" (in Hebrew). Kirjath Sepher. 44: 430. Retrieved January 30, 2025 – via NLI. Liberman, Khayim (1971). "Defusei Korets". Sinai. 68 (3–4): 182–189. Some Mizrahi Jews associate the recital of Ps. 8:4 with this glance, following Yosef Hayyim, or with a second glance. Atia, Meir (2015). Mishulhan avoteinu (in Hebrew). p. 101. Nonetheless, according to Paolo Sebastiano Medici, the Jews of Florence "kept their eyes fixed on it". Ibid. (1636). Riti e Costumi Degli Ebrei. p. 234. Retrieved May 22, 2025 - via Google Books. See also engraving by Giovanni Maria de Pian, in §Gallery, which was based on this description and captioned similarly by the artist. Isaac Cavellero's 1552 prayerbook advises the reader to "recite this blessing while upright and facing the moon, but with eyes toward the ground". Ibid. (1552). Seder hatefillot. Venice. p. 287. Chaim Benveniste writes that "The simple meaning is that one should look at the moon for the entire ritual, and so everyone does". Ibid. (1792) [1671]. Shiyarei kenesset hagedola: Orah hayim. f. 71r. Similarly Horowitz, Abraham (1615). Yesh nohalin. f. 24v. According to Joseph Trani, "This was the sign that God gave Moses in Egypt to indicate that Israel would be redeemed, pointing at the moon and saying 'like this moon', such [that Moses later] said 'this is my God and I will honor Him' . . . therefore they said in Soferim that one should look at it and say 'Blessed be your Creator . . .', the intent being that we will be able to look at God in the future . . .". Ibid. (1648) [before 1639]. Tzafenat paneah. f. 66r. Recommended by Sinzheim, Joseph David (2002) [before 1812]. Yad David: Sanhedrin. p. 78. In 1724, Aryeh Leib of Binswangen wrote to look at the moon before reciting the blessing and again while leaping. Ibid. (1729) [1724]. pp. [99], [106] (not original printing order). According to Aaron Worms, "Shocklingly, they write that one should not look at [the moon], which the medievals never mentioned, but there is no limit to human imagination. It must be that someone observed that people look at the moon and then read the liturgy out of their prayerbooks without looking up. And they did not look at the moon afterwards only because, together with the act of kissing the prayerbook upon finishing their prayers, it would resemble an idolatrous kiss toward the moon". Ibid. (1822). Me'ore or. Vol. 5. f. 171v. Isaac Elijah Landau is uncertain of the correct interpretation, adding "And it is also possible that it means to look at where the moon casts its light". Ibid. (1862). Massekhet Soferim. f. 37v. According to Shalom Perloff, one should not look at the moon until Kiddush levana. Ibid. (1901). Mishmeret shalom (in Hebrew). p. 85.) with straightened legs (Note: Yissachar Tamar writes that "I have not seen people diligent to straighten their legs". Ibid. (1979). Alei tamar (in Hebrew). Vol. 1. p. 295. However, Salman Mutzafi would. Mutzafi, Bentzion (2020). Hodesh betzion (in Hebrew). p. 34. Alexander Süsskind of Grodno “found” an instruction to face east while reciting the prayer. Ibid. (1875) [1782]. Yesod veshoresh ha-avodah. 9:1. Retrieved March 17, 2025 – via Sefaria. All four cardinal directions are attested in later sources. Tenenbaum (1995). pp. 100–101 n. 21.) and blesses "Who didst create the heavens by thy command . . ." and then one says three times "A good omen (Note: Hebrew: סימן טוב, romanized: siman tov. The words "u-mazel tov" (Hebrew: ומזל טוב) were added to Kiddush levana much later. The history of that addition is traced in Kellerman, Aaron (2024). "Mazel tov: Leverur migvan hashimushim be'ikhul shel berakha" (in Hebrew). Hemdat. Vol. 17. pp. 67–70. Retrieved January 30, 2024 via Hemdat. Note that it appears in the version of Haim of Vienna (1240-1310). Ibid. (1997). Piske or zarua. p. 113. Today this line is very commonly sung to congratulate others on any joyous announcement or occasion.) on all Israel! Blessed be your Creator . . ." (Note: "Blessed be your Creator . . ." was modified to spell JACOB by acrostic at an early date (see ed. Higger. p. 339. Retrieved January 19, 2025 - via HebrewBooks; Arian (1979), p. 32; Baer, Seligman (1901), Seder Avodat Yisrael. p. 339.; cf. Reifmann (1845), pp. 26–28; Rapoport, Solomon Judah (1913). Toledot. p. 227. Retrieved January 29, 2025 - via Google Books). The acrostic version is already attested by MS ex-Montefiore 134 f. 118v (c. 1275), Meir of Rothenburg (d. 1293), Minhagim p. 17. Retrieved January 8, 2025 - via Hebrewbooks., by some versions of the Tur OC 246 (c. 1340). Retrieved January 8, 2025 - via Sefaria., and by David Abudarham 1:8:27 (fl. 1340). Retrieved January 8, 2025 - via Sefaria. Rothenburg explains that "Jacob is etched in the moon" (cf. Judah ben Yakar (1979) [before 1218]. Perush hatefillot vehaberakhot. pp. 97-98.) while Abudarham explains that "Jacob is compared to the moon". Rothenburg is certainly not referring to Amar adonai leyaaqov, as imagined by Feuchtwanger-Sarig, Naomi (2021). Thy Father's Instruction. p. 207. Many interpretations are discussed in Perez, Michael, Otzar hapsakim: Rosh chodesh uvirkat halevana (2004). pp. 27–32. Retrieved January 8, 2025 - via HebrewBooks. According to Baer, followed by Jacob D. Schwarz, it was based on comparison to Isaiah 43:1, "Who created you, Jacob, and formed you, Israel", and Leviticus Rabbah 36:4. Retrieved January 8, 2025 - via Sefaria. and the original was in that order, or even had only those two verbs. Schwarz, Jacob D. (1906). The New Moon Benediction. Hebrew Union College (Thesis). Retrieved January 22, 2025 - via HUC Library. Compare the alternate proposal at [Weisstein, Moshe Shmuel] (November 25, 1870). "Birkat hahodesh II". Jbri Anochi (in Hebrew). 4 (8): 63–64. Erich Bischoff connects Jacob's kefitzat haderech (lit. "jumping of the road") to the jumping component. Ibid. (1907). Babylonisch-astrales im Weltbilde des Thalmud und Midrasch. p. 163. Retrieved July 10, 2025 - via Google Books. See also Arian (1979), pp. 78–79, 101. and Wolfson, Eliot R. (1995). Along the Path. pp. 1–62, 146–147. and ibid. (1997). Seductiveness of Jewish Myth. pp. 235–270 and Spitzer, David (1961). "Birkat halevana" (in Hebrew). Besdei Hemed. 4: 251. A different order of the text is proposed by Kabbalists, designed to reflect the Four Worlds; see Azulai, Hayyim David Yosef (1807). Seder avodah avodat haqodesh. Retrieved January 19, 2025 - via Google Books. p. 25, where this version is rejected. Isaac Elijah Landau offers an alternate religious explanation for the JACOB order in ibid. (1862). Massekhet Soferim. f. 38r. Another is given by Treves, Naftali Hirsch (1560) [before 1540]. Male'ah ha'aretz de'ah. f. [130r].) Then one jumps (Note: The morphology of this verb is discussed by Benveniste, Chaim (1792) [1671]. Sheyarei kenesset hagedola: Orah hayim. f. 71r. Asher ben Saul of Lunel describes dancing without any associated liturgy. Ibid. (1935) [c. 1300]. "Sefer haminhagot". Sifran shel rishonim. p. 171. Compare also the comments of Meiri and David of Estella, discussed above. See reference below for Kirchheim (1863) and Schachter (1980) on a possibly parallel description in Alilot devarim. Later Isserles would write (1590), "We celebrate and dance at Kiddush levana following the example of a wedding". OC 426:2. Jacob ben Judah of London (13th century) appears to link jumping to "Blessed be your Creator . . ." in his Etz Hayim, vol. 1 p. 365. Similarly the Turin siddur of 1525, p. [95]. Later associated with Luria; see e.g. Avodat yisrael (in Hebrew). 1971. Vol. 1. f. 205v. In MS Bodleian 1103 f. 4r, "And dance three times before it, with leisure and not pace. While dancing, Judah of Regensburg said to recite 'The voice of my beloved! . . .'. Afterwards, say 'Just as I see you but cannot touch you, so may evil be unable to touch me this month'". A mahzor printed at Venice, 1616, contains the marginal comment, ["In an ancient Italian book, after 'Blessed be your Creator . . .' is found this language: 'Just as you are eager to do the will of your Maker, so too are we careful to do the will of our Father in Heaven'"]. Quoted by Posner, Akiva Barukh (1945). Seder birkat halevana. p. 20. Sasson Mordecai Shinduch writes that one should dance while reciting "Long live David, King of Israel". Ibid. (1864) [before 1830]. Davar be'ito (in Hebrew). Vol. 2. f. 37r. According to Vasily Rozanov, one Jew who converted to Christianity in the 1850s records that the entire group would leap simultaneously. Ibid. (1903). Iraqi Jews leapt during each of the Soferim recitations. Ben Jacob, Abraham (1967). Yalkut minhagim. p. 54.) three times toward the moon, and says three times "Just as I jump but do not reach you, so too if others jump at me, let them not reach me", (Note: Eliyahu Kitov argues that this is directed at God, not the moon. Ibid. (1966). Sefer hatoda'ah (in Hebrew). Vol. 1. p. 155. Chaim U. Lipschitz understands Mordecai Yoffe in a similar way. Ibid. (1987). Kiddush Levono. p. 56.) and "Terror and dread falleth upon them, by the greatness of Thine arm they are still as a stone (Ex. 15:16)", (Note: In the version quoted by Simeon ben Zemah Duran, Ex. 15:16 is recited seven times forwards and seven times backwards. Ibid. (2012). Perush rashbatz al berakhot. p. 157. Similarly Tanya Rabbati.) and backwards, (Note: According to Sasson Mordecai Shinduch, one should take three steps back before reciting the verse backwards. Ibid. (1864) [before 1830]. Davar be'ito (in Hebrew). Vol. 2. f. 36v.) and "Amen amen selah hallelujah". Then one greets another person three times, (Note: According to Israel Zolli, this greeting was originally directed at the moon instead. Ibid. (1935). "La Luna Nel Pensiero e Nella Prassi Religiosa Del Popolo Ebreo". Lares. 3 (3/4). pp. 38–40. Retrieved March 16, 2025. JSTOR 26237915 Akiva Barukh Posner interprets Mordecai Yoffe to mean that the intent is to greet the shekhinah, although he rejects this approach. Ibid. (1945). Seder birkat halevana. pp. 22-23.) and returns home in good cheer.

Threefold repetition, reversal of Ex. 15:16, "A good omen on all Israel", and "Amen amen selah" are typical of medieval Jewish magic spells. The unique elements – addressing the moon with "Blessed be your Creator . . .", jumping towards it, and greeting others—are frequently understood as magical, but their origin is contested.

The prayerbooks of Amram ben Sheshna (d. 875), (Note: See also Zoller, Israel (1935). "La Luna Nel Pensiero e Nella Prassi Religiosa Del Popolo Ebreo". Lares. 3 (3/4): 36–37. JSTOR 26237915) Saadia ben Joseph (892–942), (Note: See also: Tafsir to Genesis (1984) p. 236. Greenberg, Dan (December 2012). Siddur RSG. Ben Gurion University (Dissertation). pp. 95-96. Higger, Michael (1943). "Saadia and the Treatise Soferim". Saadia Anniverary Volume. pp. 264-270.) and Solomon ben Nathan (c. 1150), as well as early halakhic codes like Halakhot Gedolot (c. 750–900), the Rif (c. 1085), the Eshkol (c. 1150), and the Mishneh Torah (1180), incorporate only the Talmudic practice of reciting a blessing when one sees the new moon, rejecting the Saturday-night ritual described by Soferim. Nor do Rashi or the Tosafists mention anything beyond the Talmudic blessing. According to Manoah of Narbonne (13th century), "Most people wait until Saturday night, following Soferim, but the posqim did not incorporate the words of Massechet Soferim because it makes no sense for someone to delay fulfillment of a commandment. Many things can happen to a person! Therefore all God-fearers bless at the first opportunity, and do not wait for Saturday night". According to modern scholars, Maimonides excluded Soferim's ritual from the Mishneh Torah because he recognized it as an attempt at witchcraft.

Yet by the turn of the 14th century, Soferim ritual's had been wholly accepted by Ashkenazic authorities (Orhot hayyim, Rokeah, Semag, Manhig, Shibbolei haleket, Or zarua, Mahzor Vitry (London), ex-Montefiore 134), as well as by Bahya ben Asher, Joshua ibn Shuaib, and Jonah Gerondi, and it was eventually codified in the Tur (c. 1340) and Beit Yosef (1542). However, nothing from Soferim appeared in Baladi-rite texts until the early 17th century.

Some 14th-century Italian versions include the verse, "O give thanks unto the LORD, for he is good: for his mercy endureth for ever".

Additional prayers and customs were continuously added to the ritual in the following centuries, some of unidentified origin, including a wide variety of quotes from Scripture. The order of these later additions is not consistent between prayerbooks, and they may be inserted before, between, or after elements from Soferim. Arian provides a table tracking the popularity of many additions.

=== Hasidei Ashkenaz additions ===
A tradition in the name of Judah of Regensburg (1150–1217), first recorded in the early 14th century, calls for reciting "The voice of my beloved! behold, he cometh leaping upon the mountains, skipping upon the hills (Song of Songs 2:8)". Originally connected to the jumping component (even displacing it in MS Bod. 1103), this addition was later reinterpreted by Kabbalists, who also added 2:9. It may have been inspired by a midrash (first found in Pesikta de-Rav Kahana) in which Moses "leaps" by introducing the Hebrew calendar before 400 years of slavery have elapsed.

The Sefer Hekhalot, a lost work first mentioned in the early 14th century, called for including "Long live David, King of Israel" in Kiddush levana, and this addition was later endorsed by Samuel Schlettstadt (14th century), Zelikman of Binga (d. c. 1470), Judah Obernik (c. 1450), Moses ibn Habib (1490), Abraham Saba (1500), Meir ibn Gabbai (1507), Isaac ben Eljiah Shani (1543), Naphtali Hirsch Treves (1546), and many prayerbooks, before being codified by Moses Isserles (in 1590) and Jacob Castro (before 1610). Schlettstatt compares the Hekhalot's addition directly to b. Rosh Hashanah 25a, where the phrase first appeared, but Obernik and Isserles associate it with the biblical commentaries of Nachmanides (Gen. 38:29) and Bahya (Note: Compare his commentary to Exodus 12:2. Retrieved January 30, 2025 – via Sefaria.) (Gen. 38:30), (Note: Isserles cites Bahya who explains that when David melekh yisrael chai veqayyam is used as a cipher for the new month declaration in the Talmud this is because "the House of David descends from Peretz, and Peretz corresponds to the moon". Other explanations include: that David himself corresponds to the moon, that the gematriya of the phrase is 819, equal to that of rosh chodesh, that it alludes to Ps. 89:36–38, or that it references a legend that the calendar system was established by David, or that it expresses a hope that David will come and rescue Jews from their enemies. According to Isserles, reciting it signifies that "David's kingdom, like the moon, will renew itself in the future." See: Arian (1979), pp. 79–80. Scholem, Gershom (1937). "She'elot utshuvot hameyuhasot leRabbi Yosef Gikatilla". Emet leYaakov: Sefer yovel Jacob Freimann. p. 167 n. 12. Retrieved March 11, 2025 - via HebrewBooks. See also reference, below, regarding Psalm 67.) and Castro writes that it is based on Ps. 89:37. Aaron Worms objected to this addition on theological grounds, and Israel Zolli critiques it for interrupting the prayer's flow.

=== 15th–17th century additions ===
According to Arian,

The growth of the kiddush levanah came slowly and unevenly. Some [customs] are popular and well-accepted. Others remain mysterious in origin and meaning . . . most of these accretions came during the sixteenth and seventeenth centuries, when Jewry was attempting to cope with the effects of the expulsion from Spain and the Chmielmiczi Massacres in Poland. These centuries were marked by the rise of Safed mysticism and of Sabbateanism. These new trends in Jewish mysticism are undoubtedly involved in the growth of kiddush levanah.

The additions of Psalm 121, Psalm 150, and Ps. 51:12 are first known from Moses ibn Habib's 1490 prayerbook. The Psalms were probably added as thaumaturgical spells, following Shimmush tehillim, which identifies Ps. 121 and Ps. 150 as a protection for one walking alone at night and as appropriate to mark the works of God, respectively; Jewish medievals had connected Psalm 150 to the calendrical new moon ceremony. Angelika Neuwirth adds that "[Psalm 121]'s central assertion of God's watchfulness has predestined it for a recitation within a nightly service, a vigil. Christian vigils indeed conclude with Ps. 121 . . . Kiddush levanah—being conducted at night—entails Ps. 121". Ora Brinson argues that the addition of Psalm 121 represents Karaite influence. Phil Korngruen and Meir Abramowitz note that Ps. 121, like Cant. 2:8, refers to mountains.

The additions of Psalm 19, Psalm 8, and Kaddish are first known from a 1522 Romaniote prayerbook. Mahzor Aram Tzoba (1526) includes the baraitas "A teaching of the house of Rabbi Ishmael: Had Israel merited no other privilege than (Note: Regarding this Hebrew idiom, see Shaveh, Ariel (2015). "Be-ikvei metaknei hatefillot". Iyunim betarbutam shel yehudei tzefon afrika (in Hebrew). pp. 194–197. Retrieved December 14, 2025 - via Academia.) to greet their Father in Heaven once a month, that would have been sufficient . . ." and "Said Rabbi Johanan: Whoever blesses the New Moon (Note: In all MSS rosh chodesh, "the New Moon" but in modern printings only chodesh, "the month".) in its time, it is like he has welcomed the shekhinah", (Note: Similarly the Conservative Siddur Sim Shalom (1985) Rubinstein, Jeffrey (Fall 1988). Conservative Theology. 41 (1). pp. 34–35. Retrieved January 9, 2025 – via Internet Archive. Stone, Ariel (2022). Siddur Shir Tikvah (4th ed.). Custom Siddur. p. 134.) before concluding with a passage from b. Berakhot 64a, "Torah scholars increase peace in the world . . ." and Kaddish deRabbanan. In 1548, Solomon ibn Melekh recorded a practice to recite Ps. 89:36-38.

Song of Songs 8:5 was also added, in reference to "welcoming the shekhinah", as were Aleinu and a messianic extract from Todros Abulafia's Otzar hakavod:

When the appropriate time comes (Note: Modern liturgies slightly modify Abulafia's language to read "May it be Your will . . .") to fill in the moon's flaw, so that it lacks nothing, "the light of the moon shall be as the light of the sun, and the light of the sun shall be sevenfold, as the light of seven days", these being the seven days of creation . . . as it was before the diminution—for it says, "the two great lights". (Note: Gen. 1:16) Then will the verse be realized, "they shall seek the Lord their God, and David their king" (Note: Hosea 3:5) . . .

Mordecai Yoffe (1530–1612) was the first to prefer reciting Kiddush levana in a group. A Spanish translation was published in 1650, and Sephardic halakhists endorsed reciting Kiddush levana privately in the vernacular.

==== Lurianic and Sabbatean ====
16th-century Lurianic kabbalists added Psalm 148 and began a practice of shaking one's garments (especially tzitzit) after the ritual, in order to dislodge any evil spirits drawn by the moon. Both Ps. 148:1–6 and Aleinu were probably added in order to emphasize that the blessing is directed at God, rather than the moon itself. According to a Sephardic recension of Shimmush Tehillim, Psalm 148 cures ailments.

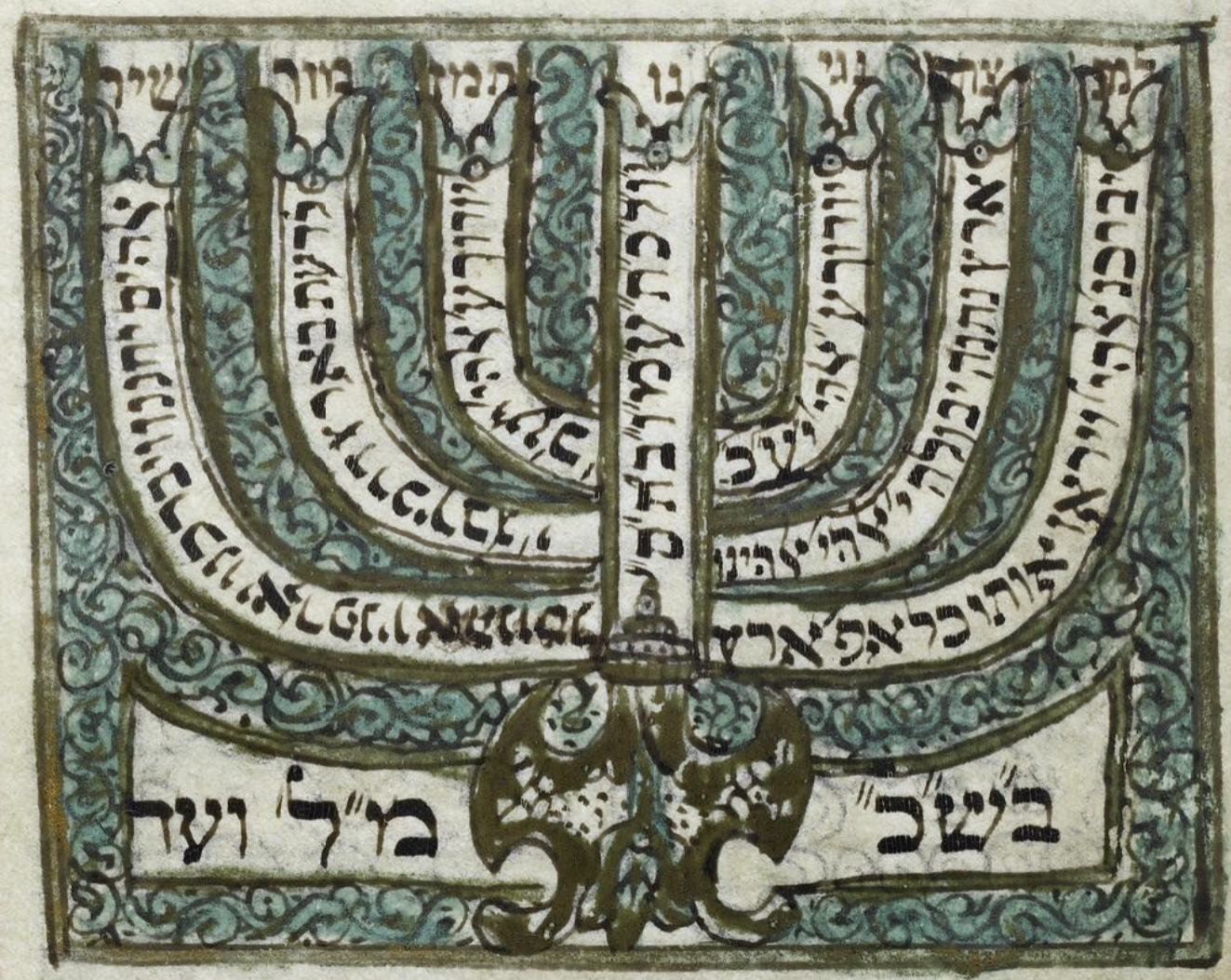
Micrography of Psalm 67 in the shape of a menorah, included in a 1728 prayerbook for Kiddush levana.

In 1651, Sabbatai Zevi attended Kiddush levana in İzmir, but when the others recited "A good omen on all Israel!" he added ". . . and all Ishmael!".

Yechiel Michel Epstein Ashkenazi's 1693 Kitzur shenei luhot haberit, a popular Sabbatean halakhic work, is the first known source for beginning the ritual with a Leshem Yihud and for following it with Psalm 67, the latter of which was originally to be recited while mentally tracing the shape of a menorah. Hemdat yamim (1731) claims that "his master" added Num. 23:9, Jer. 10:11, 30:10-11, and 46:27-28, and Ps. 18:31.

All such additions were rejected by Elijah of Vilna (1720–1797), who included no verses in Kiddush levana.

=== 18th–19th century additions ===
==== Ashkenazic ====
The additions of Adon Olam and Ana beKoach are first known from a 1724 prayerbook edited by Aryeh Leib of Binswangen, which also includes Ps. 118:5–24.

Among Hasidim, Kiddush levana was established as a cure, matching non-Jewish folk liturgies for the new moon. Pinchas of Koretz (1726–1791) claimed that checking one's tzitzit after Kiddush levana prevents fever. Mordecai of Niesuchojeże (1742–1800) followed Psalm 121 with "Blessed are You, O LORD, who heals the sick of Israel". According to Naftali Zvi of Ropshitz (1760–1827), a man whose wife is suffering from unusual menstrual bleeding should say "that they might not deviate from their set function" with the intent that this also apply to her body. Others added "let me not have toothaches" after "let them not reach me"; Chabad rabbis would physically touch their teeth during the recitation.

Menachem Mendel Schneerson touches his teeth after "let them not reach me" during a 1988 Kiddush levana. (Note: The original Hebrew video caption misinterprets Schneerson's gesture: "He would always pass three fingers over his moustache before reciting 'Blessed be your Creator . . .'")

In Brody, 1844,

The ritual was conducted without any sense of unity, order, or aesthetic sense. For the blessing was, instead of being sung, shouted out by the entire congregation. Every latecomer began from the beginning, and in the same high tone as his predecessor, and a remarkable jumble arose, where one could hardly distinguish anything but loud, discordant sounds, or rather, harsh exclamations, but by no means comprehensible words. The peculiar bowing and swaying, which in Polish synagogues is somewhat an integral part of the service, was naturally also present here, only it was much more noticeable and prominent, in a quiet moonlit night, in the open air, on a public street (where, especially the swinging tendency of each individual found an unrestricted, free space and could develop in its perfected form). Christian groups observed this scene from a distance.

Hasidic Jews later began to dance after the ritual, and to distribute food and/or liquor. Max Letteris added Psalm 120. Others appended lines 13–24 of El Adon, "Good are the heavenly lamps which God created . . . he fixed the form of the moon"; (Note: Yitzhak Yosef writes that one should not say these lines if reciting Kiddush levana for Av before Tisha B'Av, but others disagree.) Jerahmiel Hofstein (1860-1909) skipped Tachanun on the day after he recited Kiddush levana.

==== Mizrahi ====
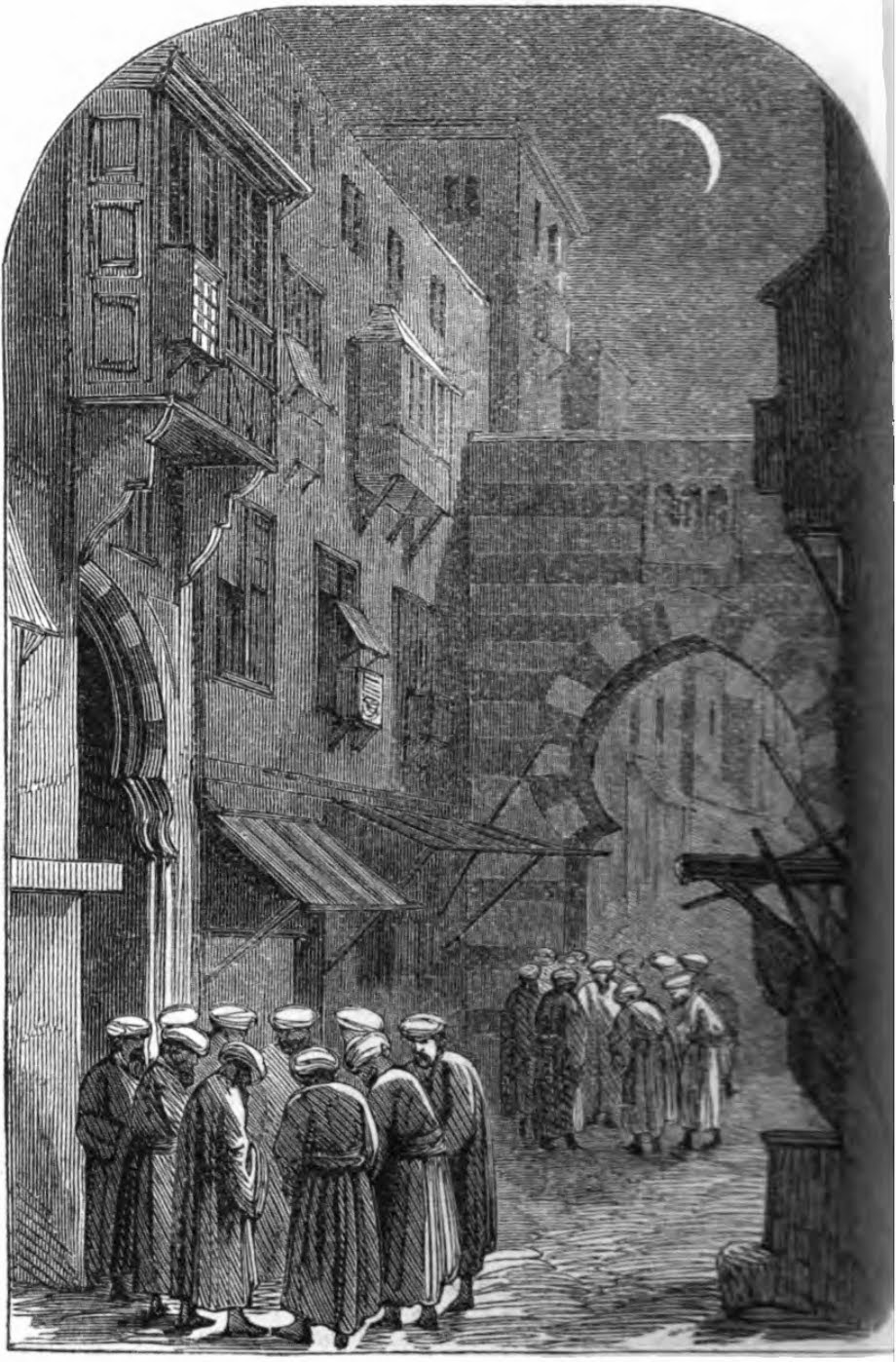
Blessing the Moon (1866) is based on Ben Oliel's description.

According to Eliezer Papo (1785–1828), one should ritually bathe before Kiddush levana; others say that one should wash their hands. Papo also writes that one should recite Is. 30:26. In 1859, Haim Palachi said that a man reciting Kiddush levana should clutch his heart with both hands, look at himself in the mirror, give three coins to charity, look at someone named Isaac, and say "Isaac, Isaac, Isaac". Among the Bene Israel, "it was once customary to throw nutshells, candle stubs, and Sabjir leaves at the moon [during Kiddush levana]. A silver or gold coin would be held up toward the moon and then kept in a box as a good-luck charm". Chaim Yosef David Azulai (1724–1806) writes that one should meditate on the acronym "YAHDWNHY" while responding "Amen" to Kiddush levana, but according to Elijah Suleiman Mini (1818–1899), one should have in mind "Emet"; some prayerbooks include extensive Lurianic kavanot. Yosef Hayyim (1835–1909) recommended enjoying a festive meal before Kiddush levana, and composed a piyyut to be sung on the occasion, Simhu na bevirkat halevana.

In 1865, Maxwell M. Ben Oliel described:

As many as five or six [groups] would be within a stone's throw of each other, and often cause confusion and interrupt one another, for when the Kaddish is said, all within hearing must pause to make the responses . . . The streets in an Eastern town are narrow and dark, and in the vicinity of the synagogue perhaps the narrowest and darkest. The men scatter themselves here and there, with their faces turned upwards in search of the moon, hid behind the lofty houses. At last one of the party has caught a glimpse of her, and he hails his co-religionists to come to the spot . . . And now they stand in a semicircular group; each joins his feet as in the 'Amidah at the synagogue—parting them at the toes and uniting them at the heels; the most devout, perhaps, fold their arms across the breast, and all stand in a reverential attitude . . .

=== Recent additions ===
Mizrahi prayerbooks also include a homily from Midrash Tehillim, "My Rock in this world and my Redeemer in the world to come", and Ez. 16:13 and Ps. 75:11. Some Mizrahi congregations conclude with the cantor reciting a mi shebeirakh for the congregation; among the Jews of southern Tafilalt, this is preceded by communal recital of "The likeness of Jacob is etched beneath the Throne of Glory". (Note: An aphorism regarding the constellations, commonly attributed to the Talmud (cf. Talmud Bavli Chullin 91b, viewed on Sefaria on January 9, 2025, and Gershom ben Judah's and Rashi's commentaries ad loc, viewed on Sefaria on January 9, 2025). A similar phrase is found in Hekhalot Rabbati 9:3, viewed on Maagarim on January 9, 2025, and Eichah Rabbah 2:2, viewed on Maagarim on January 9, 2025, but no homily containing the exact phrase is found in any text except Jacob Sikilli's Yalkut Talmud Torah (14th century), which presents it as a quotation from the Midrash Yelammedenu, although it is cited by earlier medievals, including Ibn Ezra (Deut. 32:8. Retrieved January 8, 2025 - via Sefaria.) and Ezra of Gerona (Introduction to Canticles. Retrieved January 8, 2025 - via Sefaria.). See Hanoch Albeck's Bereishit Rabbah (1936) p. 788 and notes. Sikilli's version of the Yelammedenu is said to be post-Islamic with later insertions. See Posnanski, Samuel (1912), "On the Talmud Torah Collection of Jacob beRabbi Hananel Sikilli" (in Hebrew), in Hatzofeh me-eretz hager vol. III p. 19, and Mann, Jacob (1940), The Bible As Read and Preached in the Old Synagogue, English pagination, p. 28, Hebrew pagination, pp. 171, 316. Judah ben Yakar (d. before 1218) writes that "the likeness of Jacob is etched on the moon . . . this is not found in any aggada, but rather 'on the Throne of Glory'". Ibid. (1979). Perush hatefillot vehaberakhot. pp. 97-98. According to Abraham Naftali Zvi Roth, this homily was the original justification for the Kabbalistic ban on looking at the moon (see note, above). Roth, Abraham Naftali Zvi (1967). "Kiddush levana" (in Hebrew). Yeda Am. Vol. 12 [misprinted 13]. p. 5. Similarly, in many versions the liturgy "Blessed be your Creator . . ." has been modified to spell JACOB by acrostic. See note, above, and Ibn Gabbai, Meir (1560) [1507]. Tola'at Yaaqov. f. 55r. Retrieved January 20, 2025 – via HebrewBooks.) Other Mizrahi prayerbooks include Ps. 49:23; Ben Zion Hazan would stamp his feet during this recital, while Eliyahu Chriqui and his followers would turn around before reciting it seven times. In July 2022, Avraham Mimoun (1940-2022) began a practice of reciting the blessing over wine before Kiddush levana.

In addition to lines 13–24 of El Adon, some have begun to recite lines 17–18, or 17–24, of Bemotza'e yom menuha, "May this month be as forseen by the father of prophets (Note: Some commentators prefer Jeremiah, others Moses.) and let happy voices fill this house . . .", skipping lines 21–22 on weeknights. Various Hasidic groups then continue with their own songs; Raphael Aaron Roth (1948-2020), for example, would sing Ps. 22:29, followed by a tune he had composed for part of the Amidah, "Reign over us, O LORD god alone, with kindness and compassion".

After Yom Kippur of 1948, some groups in Jerusalem followed Kiddush levana with Hatikvah. On January 19, 1980, the Jewish Arts Community of the Bay hosted a 1,500-person Kiddush levana with masks, choreographed dancing, shofar blowing, original liturgy, the Priestly Blessing, and other novel ritual elements. At one 1992 kiruv retreat, participants followed Kiddush levana with the hora, howling, and meditation on "giving and receiving love". In 1999, a liberal Philadelphia group concluded by adding "a touch of New Age to this ancient ritual by forming a circle and conferring blessings on one another".

In 1998, Geela-Rayzel Raphael published English-language songs for a new feminist version of the ritual, including "Sun, Moon, and Stars" and "Schechinah Moon", as did Marcia Falk in 1999, including "What Calls You Home", "Renewal of the Moon", and a translation of Dahlia Ravikovitch's Halevana bageshem ("Moon in the Rain"). Falk also included an original Hebrew poem, Hithadshut halevana ("Renewal of the Moon") and recommended that readings be separated by "periods of silence, conducive to reflection or meditation".

As of 2010, some non-Orthodox masculine versions incorporate study. Bonna Devora Haberman (1960-2015) included poetry by Tzemah Yoreh. Congregation Shir Tikvah (Portland, Oregon) recites an original English-language Kiddush levana liturgy. In 2024, At The Well published The Way of Blessing the Moon: A Modern Kiddush Levana, which includes a unique blessing for each Hebrew month. Thirteen female and non-binary poets were selected to contribute a blessing, out of dozens that applied.

== Controversy and popularity ==
As early as the 15th century, Kiddush levana was "a highly visible target for rationalist critiques, both Jewish and non-Jewish". From the start of the 19th century through the Holocaust, it was regularly criticized by advocates for liturgical reform, and it received an additional theological challenge from the Apollo moon landings. By the late 1970s, Kiddush levana had dropped out of most prayerbooks and reference works, and it was widely described as defunct. However, the ritual has experienced a revival in recent decades.

=== 15th–18th century ===
Alilot Devarim (before 1468 (Note: A 1468 manuscript of Alilot Devarim mentions "this day, nearly 1,400 years since our exile" while a 1473 copy says "this day, more than 1,400 years since our exile". Most scholars believe that the Alilot Devarim must have been composed shortly before the 1468 manuscript was written, roughly 1,400 years after the destruction of the Second Temple in 70 CE. However, Robert Bonfil interprets the divergence between manuscripts to indicate that the date was being continuously updated by successive scribes, arguing that it proves nothing about the book's age. According to Bonfil, the 1468 and 1473 versions also differ too widely to share an immediate common source, and must follow that original by some decades to allow for stemma formation. The authors of the two MSS probably knew each other, collaborating on MS Parma 2729. Joseph ben Meshullam, whose commentary is included in both manuscripts, writes that "you know of the great difficulty I had in retrieving this book from its hiding place, torn and defaced, mostly illegible . . .", although most scholars assume that Alilot Devarim and its "commentary" share authorship. Bonfil suggests that Alilot Devarim was probably composed in the 1360s, and fingers Joseph ben Eliezer Bonfils as a possible author. Ibid. (1980). "Sefer 'Alilot devarim". Eshel Beer-Sheva (in Hebrew). 2: 255.)), a satirical critique of rabbinical practice, attacks the custom of waiting to recite the blessing until Saturday night, the practice of jumping at the moon, and the liturgy "Blessed be your Creator . . ." The Kol Sakhal (1504) of "Amitai bar Yedaya ibn Raz of Alcalay" calls Kiddush levana "not only complete idiocy but obvious idolatry" and moon-worship. Johannes Pfefferkorn called it idolatrous in 1510, and it was also criticized by Paul Staffelsteiner in 1536 the Verzeychnuß in 1560, and Giulio Morosini in 1683. In southern Germany, "after Kiddush levana, a total solar eclipse occurred the very next day. The horrified townspeople immediately blamed the Jews . . ."

Kiddush levana is rarely mentioned in 16th and 17th century Christian accounts of Yom Kippur, but regularly mentioned by the end of the 18th century. In 1677, assaults by Christians forced the Jews of Livorno to restrict public Kiddush levana to immediately outside the synagogue, enforced by a fine. In 1693, Wolfgang Preissler used Kiddush levana to justify censorship of Jewish books in Prague. In 1723, Jean Frédéric Bernard recorded that "this ceremony is not equally in use with all of [the Jews]". Francesco Trevisani attacked it as idolatrous in 1728, as did Christoph Gustav Christian in 1731. Circa 1740, Jonathan Eybeschutz defended the ritual from a mocking crowd of Christian theologians. In 1744, "Leib Leon was reciting Kiddush levana in the altschulgasse and one gentile, a soapseller, shot him with a bow". In 1765, Samuel Jacob Hanau "studied nothing but the Bible and the Moreh Nevuhim . . . he ceased to observe Kiddush levana and began to mock it".

=== 19th century ===
At the turn of the 19th century, Dutch authorities had "proscribed the benediction of the new moon". S. A. Horodetsky describes how Joseph Perl "upon seeing Jews reciting Kiddush levana, brought the police and dispersed them". In 1810, the First French Empire banned Kiddush levana, following a report by Timoléon de Cossé-Brissac.

In 1837, Abraham Geiger called for ending the public ritual and reverting to the original short Talmudic blessing, a position he later reaffirmed. The Supreme Council of the Israelites of Baden banned Kiddush levana. Erasmus Scott Calman critiqued Kiddush levana as idolatrous in 1840, as did Samuel Cahen in the same year. Calman brought Robert M'Cheyne to a Kiddush levana in Iași, and M'Cheyne repeated Calman's critiques in 1839 and 1841. By 1845, Sabbath-Blatt could express surprise "that any enlightened rabbi would concern himself with levana-worship". In 1852, Isaac Samuel Reggio wrote that he had initially thought that the public ritual should end, before changing his mind. Hirsch Bär Fassel disapproved of jumping during Kiddush levana, and Leopold Schott disapproved of reciting it without a cantor; Isaak Markus Jost sharply criticized the Soferim additions. In 1859, Joseph Barclay debated Kiddush levana with several Jews, calling it idolatrous.

Russian officials first proposed a rabbinic commission to evaluate Kiddush levana in 1851, and regional governors began to restrict its recitation in July 1852. In 1854, Pavel Ignatieff commissioned a report from Moisei Berlin on Kiddush levana, which found "obscene (nepristoinye) phrases incorporated within the liturgy", demonstrating a fanatical, messianic undertone. This report implicitly declared that the ritual should be banned throughout Imperial Russia. Leon Mandelshtam contested Berlin's finding, and ultimately only the post-Talmudic additions were banned, as well as the practice of reciting it outdoors. Mandelshtam again published a proposed reform to the ritual in 1861.

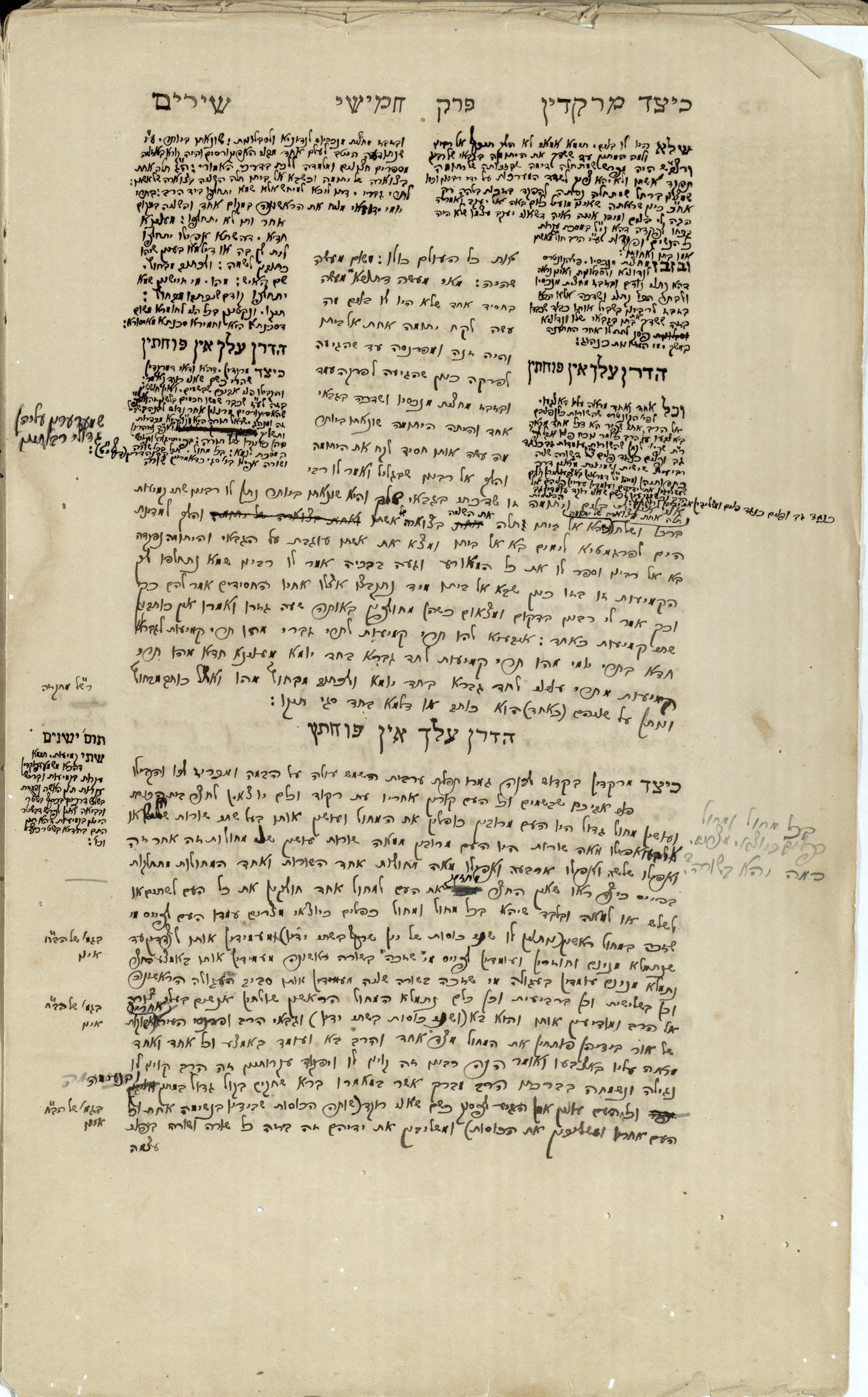
"Keitzad merakedin beKiddush levana", a parody of Hasidic dance during Kiddush levana in Hermann Schapira's Massechet Hasidim (1869).

Isaac Baer Levinsohn (d. 1860) wrote an extended satire of Hasidic dance during Kiddush levana, which circulated among Maskilim in manuscript before being published in 1867. Similarly, Hermann Schapira included a parody of Hasidic dance during Kiddush levana in Massechet Hasidim, a spoof Talmudic dialogue he wrote in 1869. Ignác Reich (1821–1887) led controversial Kiddush levana services with drum accompaniment and Hasidic-style dancing.

In 1875, H. Y. L. Katzenellenbogen called for an end to the "embarrassing" public ritual in the pages of Ha-Karmel. Simon Diament called for modernization in 1884. In an 1891 dialogue published in Ha-Tsfira, one character says that the ritual embarrasses Judaism before the world; the other, a rabbi, appeals to the value of tradition. In 1892, François Borloz, a missionary, critiqued Kiddush levana as primitive and idolatrous. In response, Gottlieb Klein, a Stockholm rabbi, defended the ritual on theological grounds, while Abraham Meyer, a Tlemcen rabbi, suggested that the jumping and backwards scripture elements should be discontinued, and that the remaining elements should only be said at home, citing both theology and fear of prejudice. In 1893, the American Hebrew reported that "These things have passed away . . . Not now in Jewry is it customary for us to assemble on the ninth or tenth night of the month and say the sanctification of the moon". In 1898, Lewis Naphtali Dembitz wrote that it is "best to omit" all elements beyond the Talmudic blessing, which he calls "a great deal of half-Cabbalistic trifles".

=== 20th century ===
At the beginning of the 20th century, Galician Jews were often attacked when observing Kiddush levana. At the 1910 rabbinical conference in Saint Petersburg, "One resolution appears to outsiders plainly inconceivable in its mediaevalness . . . it was resolved that the blessing of the new moon should be permitted in the streets as a public worship as are the pilgrimages of the Christian churches, but at the same time it was declared that in a case of emergency, it was permitted to pronounce this blessing at the window". However, Vasily Rozanov supported Kiddush levana, writing in 1903 that "there is something very nice here . . . a mysterious courtship with nature, and it was officially permitted in the Soviet Union as of 1926.

Eco Israelita attacked Kiddush levana in 1916. The editors of Der Tog repeatedly called on American Jews to hold Kiddush levana indoors to avoid gentile criticism. Edward Keith-Roach banned reciting Kiddush levana at the Western Wall on Tisha B'Av 1930, causing "great resentment"; in June 1936, British police arrested several Jews in Jerusalem for reciting Kiddush levana after curfew. In 1931, Samuel Krauss described jumping at the moon as a primitive magical practice, "so strange that even Isserles acknowledged that it had a suspicion of idolatry attached to it . . . it is only maintained out of respect for old traditions." In 1937, a controversy developed among the Jews of Syracuse, New York after some felt the ritual had embarrassed the community in front of their gentile neighbors. In 1936 Vienna, by contrast,

I’m walking along the Obere Donaustraße; it’s a beautiful, moonlit, starry night. On Grosse-Schiffgasse, there’s a dense crowd. I walk closer and hear: Kol dodi zeh . . . it's Kiddush levana! Perhaps two hundred people are standing tightly together, reciting the sacred psalms. Here in Vienna—especially on Schiffgasse, which is Vienna’s "Rumbach Street", it’s become customary . . . A car turns into the street, but backs out politely as soon as the driver sees the praying crowd. This “Wiener Spiess” (typical Viennese citizen) does this not only out of courtesy and respect for others, but also out of reverence for religion.

Der Stürmer used Kiddush levana in antisemitic propaganda, declaring that "to truly appreciate how the Jew hates gentiles, one need only read this liturgy" (image right). In Poland, "an occasional Rabbi or pious Jew was hanged for supposedly selling military secrets during the ceremony of blessing the new moon". In 1943, the Kingdom of Romania

issued an order forbidding Jews to recite the New Moon Prayer. The Government in announcing the order, has stated that as the New Moon Prayer was recited by the Jews out of doors it was impossible for it to tolerate the Prayer, as the pro-Allied tendencies of the Jews were well-known and as the recital of the Prayer out of doors placed the Jews in a position to give signals to Allied aeroplanes.

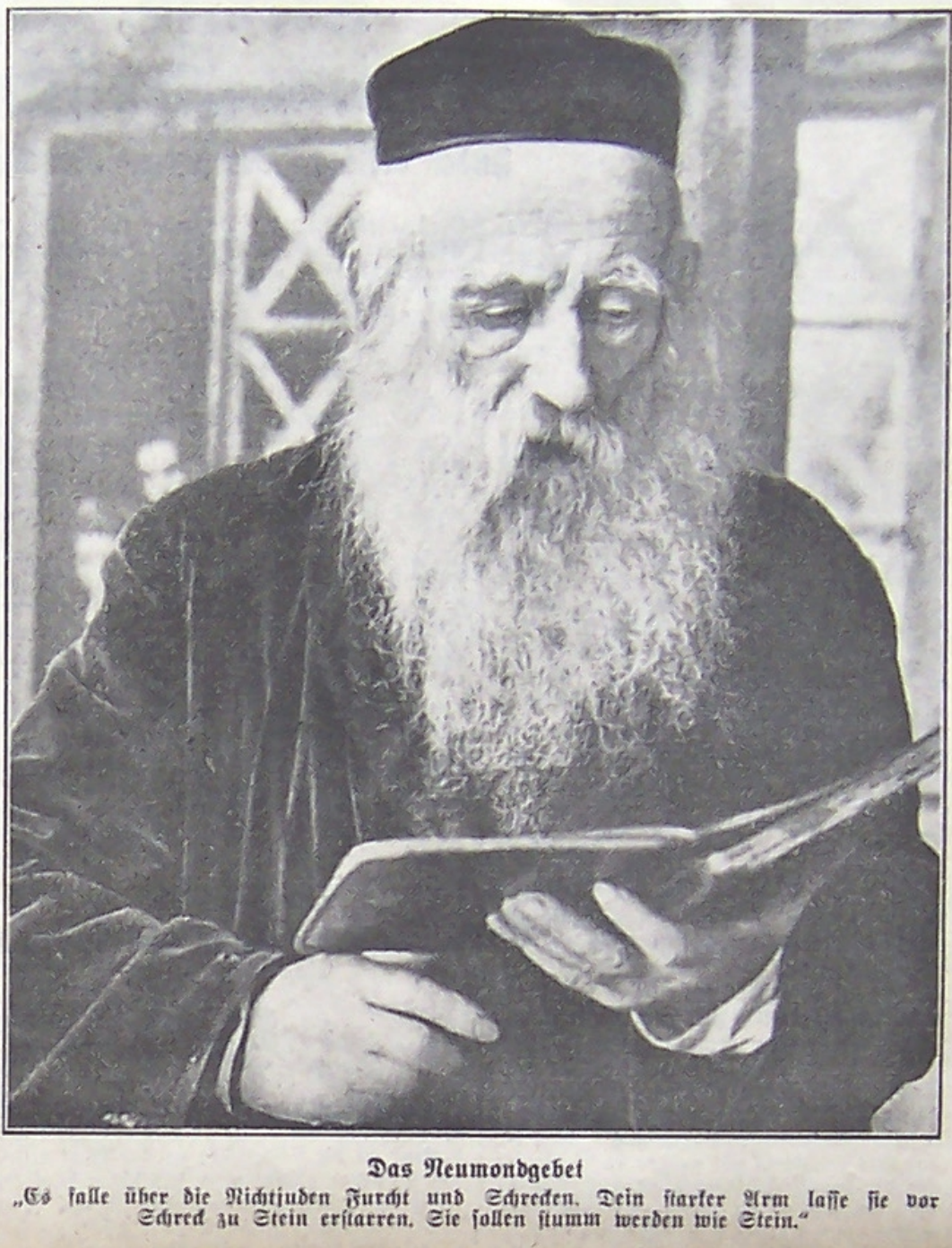
Der Stürmer translates Kiddush levana: "Let terror and dread fall upon the gentiles!" (November 25, 1943)

Generations of the Authorised Daily Prayer Book expurgated all ritual elements, and some other 20th-century Orthodox prayerbooks ignored it entirely. It did not appear in most 20th-century Conservative, Reform, and Reconstructionist prayerbooks. David Mevorach Seidenberg writes that, during his rabbinical training at JTS, "I used to invite fellow rabbinical students to participate in Kiddush levana . . . sometimes people would refuse, calling the ritual 'pagan'".

By 1958, "only ultra-orthodox Jews" observed it. In 1968, Eric L. Friedland described Kiddush levana as "unjustly-ignored ... The inconvenience of the late evening hour, when the blessing is to be recited, the cumbrous rubrics, and the mystical accretions surrounding the prayer all account for its current lack of recognition ... Elbogen's Der jüdische Gottesdienst is silent about the benediction; (Note: Eleanor Davis notes that Elbogen (p. 125; trans. Scheindlin (1993) p. 105) misattributed the Yerushalmi's discussion to Rosh Chodesh Mussaf, apparently in complete ignorance of Kiddush levana. Davis, Eleanor (March 2024). Renewing the New Moon: Kiddush levanah and Progressive Judaism. Leo Baeck College (MA thesis). p. 23 n. 48. Elbogen's later Encyclopaedia Judaica was meant to contain an article on the subject, but never reached M for "Mondbenediktion" due to the Holocaust.) nor do the American Conservative prayerbooks contain it . . . De Sola Pool and Birnbaum are the only American compilers to leave the blessing and its full complement entire". By 1971, according to Abraham Millgram, "The Kiddush levana is now hardly known at all. Only few congregations still gather outside their synagogues to consecrate the moon. Most modern prayer books do not even include the prayers for this service". In 1978, Isaac Klein, too, described it as an "all but forgotten ritual" and in the same year, Avram Arian wrote that it was "one of the least well known ... it has fallen into a state of disuse". In 1980, Leo Miller called it "a rite rarely practiced by Jews in the United States".

But Kiddush levana began to enjoy new popularity in Hasidic and right-wing Orthodox circles at around the same time, and in 1980, Martin Lockshin rejected Klein's description of Kiddush levana as "all but forgotten". Nonetheless, according to Arian, "only the most halakhically scrupulous of Orthodox Jews" observed it as of 1978. In 1992, Chabad announced a campaign to popularize its observance.

In 1996, Kiddush levana was described as "the least observed of all" outdoor Jewish rituals. Marcia Falk witnessed it in 1999, but wrote "The recitation of birkat hal'vanah is rather uncommon today; I never witnessed it when I was growing up . . . Nothing I had seen in feminist Jewish rituals—or, indeed, in the rituals of many non-Jewish feminists—looked more open to the label of 'paganism' (a label frequently used to censure Jewish feminist innovations) than what I was witnessing here, on the streets of Sha'arey Hesed, being enacted by members of a devout Jewish sect."

=== Apollo moon landing ===
In 1959, Shlomo Goren ruled that any Jew on the moon would be exempt from Kiddush levana, joking that one would not need to sanctify the Earth either, to the general agreement of a rabbinical conference. Menashe J. Nebenzahl wrote in reply, "I congratulate Rabbi Goren on his initiative . . . but travel to the moon is against Jewish law and stands in violation of God's will. To perform a mitzvah on the moon would be like tovel vesheretz beyado". However, most rabbis have agreed with Goren that an astronaut on the moon need not recite Kiddush levana.

The Detroit Jewish News reacts to the moon landing (July 25, 1969).

After the 1969 Apollo moon landing, William Greider predicted the end of Kiddush levana in the Washington Post, writing "The moon landing . . . destroys the mystery of the symbol and alters forever perspectives of faith and imagination. Once men get beyond the old mysteries, they will surely have to create new myths". Indeed, some Jews advocated for altering or abandoning the ritual, which includes jumping toward the moon and saying "Just as I jump but do not reach you", although others instead denied that the landing had taken place. Aaron Zeitlin wrote in 1971, "The scientific reality of the moon doesn't interest us . . . were Jews to populate a moon colony, they would recite Kiddush levana there!"

Goren immediately proposed emending prayerbooks to adopt an alternate version of that line, but Shimon Hirari, Joseph B. Soloveitchik, Chaim Kanievsky, Yitzhak Yosef, Joel Teitelbaum, and Yehuda Kesus rejected any change to the liturgy, and only Goren's personal synagogue ever adopted the new version. However, Arthur Waskow wrote a different emended version for Jewish Renewal congregations in 1997, and Kerry Olitzky wrote another one in 2010; Dalia Marx wrote a third in 2021. In 2009, "Zvi Konikov and [Buzz] Aldrin exchanged thoughts on the monthly Jewish custom of the sanctification of the moon, and Aldrin repeated the Hebrew words 'Kiddush Levana.'"

=== 21st century ===
In 2003, Jerusalem Post editor Yosef Goell caused controversy by calling Kiddush levana "one of the last vestiges of ancient Jewish paganism". Michael A. Hoffman II critiqued it as "blatantly pagan" in 2008.

In December 2024, François Legault proposed banning prayer in public places in Quebec, and in November 2025 the government introduced a bill to enact the ban. This bill would outlaw public Kiddush levana in Quebec.

== In Orthodox Judaism ==
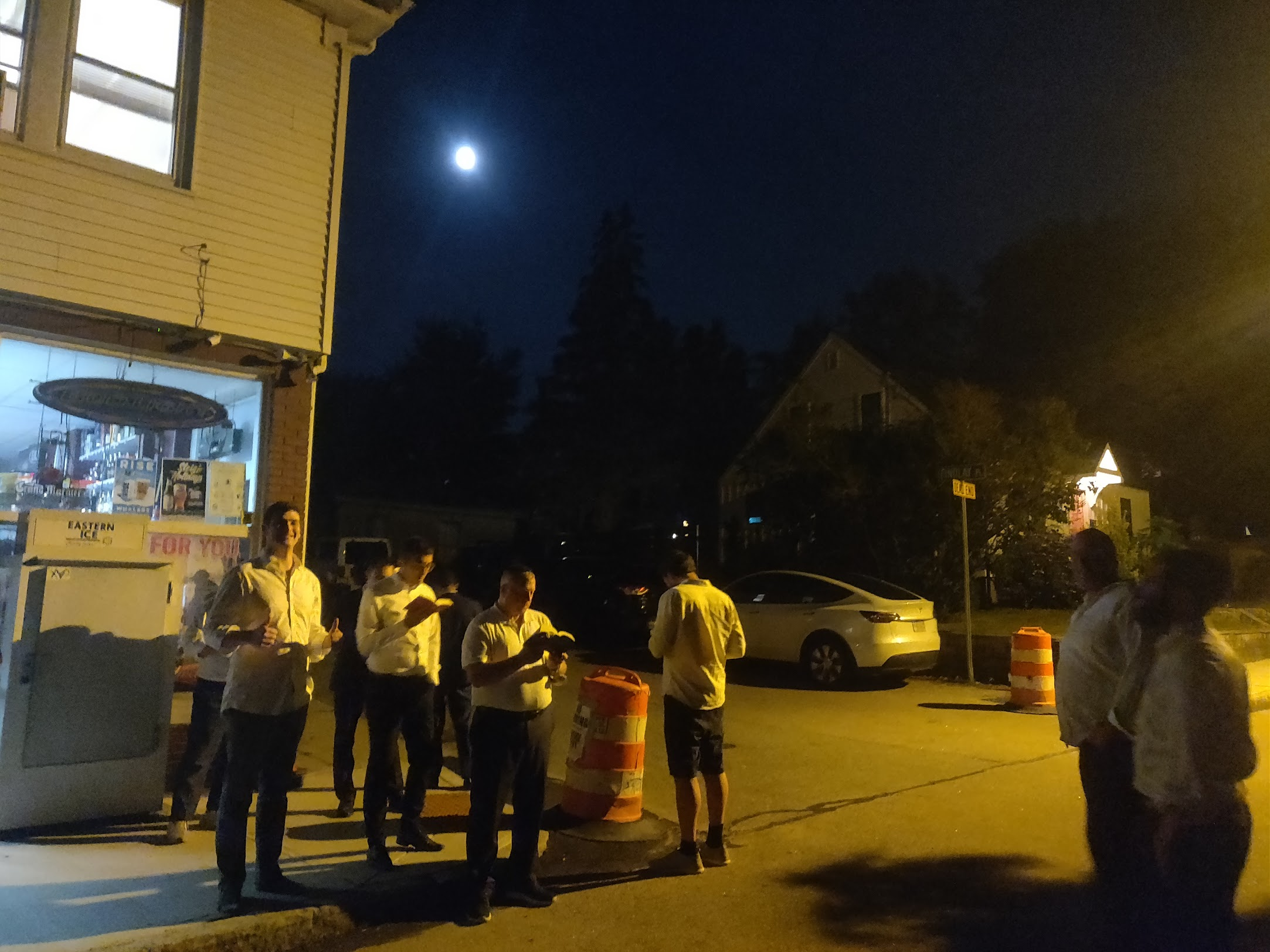
Congregation Ahavath Israel (Newport, RI) recites Kiddush levana on July 5, 2025.

As of 2024, Kiddush levana is included with the Soferim elements in all mainstream Orthodox prayerbooks, including recent editions of the Authorised Daily Prayer Book. However, Sraya Deblitzky followed Elijah of Vilna by including no verses from Scripture.

Kiddush levana's inclusion in recent prayerbooks speaks to "the growing influence of mysticism and Hassidism". Falk writes,

If Orthodox Jews today are comfortable with the ritual of birkat hal'vanah, which contains vestiges of these earlier times, it only attests to their sense of secure self-identification as Jews. They needn't be concerned that someone overhearing their prayers might think that they are literally worshiping the moon, for such a thought would be preposterous. Traditional Jews observing the practice of birkat hal'vanah seem unselfconsciously to enjoy the ritual with all its celebratory, nature-loving, "pagan" undertones—presumably aware that it is a link to their ancient history.

However, according to Ron H. Feldman, "While the contemporary Orthodox new moon rituals preserve elements of both the Talmudic and kabbalistic practices, the interpretation of the rituals minimizes the kabbalistic legacy." Two editors of the current Rabbinical Council of America prayerbook, Arie Folger and Aton Holzer, write that, although it was "marked for omission by some reviewers", nonetheless "we . . . don't flinch from including . . . Kiddush Levanah . . . we provide a basis to rationalize [its] use".

The exact arrangement varies between prayerbooks, but a typical modern version includes the following elements (^{M}=Mizrahi only, ^{A}=Ashkenazic only):

1. ^{M} Psalm 19 and a homily on it from Midrash Tehillim, "My Rock in this world and my Redeemer in the world to come".
2. ^{M} Ps. 8:2 and 8:4.
3. Psalm 148:1–6
4. Some form of Leshem Yihud
5. Judah bar Ezekiel's liturgy.
6. Three times, "Blessed be your Creator . . ."
7. Jumping toward the moon, declaring three times, "Just as I jump but do not reach you . . ."
8. "Terror and dread falleth upon them, by the greatness of Thine arm they are still as a stone (Ex. 15:16)".
9. The same verse backwards, "As a stone they are still of Thine arm by the greatness falleth upon them dread and terror".
10. Three times, "Long live David, King of Israel".
11. Exchanging shalom aleikhem and aleikhem shalom.
12. Three times, "A good sign and a good omen on all Israel!"
13. ^{A} Song of Songs 2:8–9
14. ^{M} Ps. 51:12
15. Psalm 121
16. Psalm 150
17. A passage from the Talmud, "A teaching of the house of Rabbi Ishmael: Had Israel merited no other privilege than to greet their Father in Heaven once a month, that would have been sufficient. Said Abaye: By law we say it standing."
18. ^{A} Song of Songs 8:5
19. A modified extract from Todros Abulafia's Otzar hakavod, "May it be Your will to fill in the moon's flaw . . ."
20. Psalm 67
21. ^{A} Aleinu (Note: See above. Aleinu, Kaddish, and El adon are not recited by many Western Ashkenazic communities. Madrikh le-minhag Ashkenaz ha-muvhaḳ (PDF) (in Hebrew). Bene Berak: Mechon Moreshes Ashkenaz. 2014. p. 29. At the conclusion of Yom Kippur in Frankfurt, 1818, Aleinu was omitted in Maariv and recited instead outside after Kiddush Levana. Geiger, Shelomoh Zalman (1868). Divrei Kehillot. Frankfurt am Main: J. Kauffmann. p. 271.)
22. Some form of Kaddish
23. ^{M} Isaiah 30:26 and Ezekiel 16:13
24. ^{A} Lines 13–24 of El Adon, "Good are the heavenly lamps which God created . . . he fixed the form of the moon"

=== Halakha ===
Kiddush levana is a d'rabbanan. While it is customary to say the prayer with the large crowd, or at least with a minyan, it can be also said alone. According to David Lida, even one who has not yet said Maariv should recite Kiddush levana with the rest of the community; this ruling is also cited by Yechiel Michel Epstein Ashkenazi in the name of "the writings of Bunim Halevi of Rymanów". Most authorities advise one to greet others with the plural shalom aleikhem, and to greet at least three different people.

A mourner sitting shiva traditionally does not recite Kiddush levana due to the happy nature of its recitation, unless the shiva will end after the tenth of the month and there is a concern that he will miss the opportunity to recite it entirely. Others rule that a mourner should not recite Kiddush levana during shiva unless the shiva will not be over before the last night that it is possible to recite it. A mourner may, however, participate in the shalom aleikhem following Kiddush levana. According to another custom, one does not recite Kiddush levana in a city with an unburied corpse.

Menahem Recanati (1223–1290) ruled that one should recite it outdoors, Moses Fuller added that one should not stand under a roof, and Jacob Moelin (1365-1427) said to look directly at the moon and not through a window; all became standard Ashkenazic law, but the Tosafists write that "we do not know the reason for this custom" and Jacob Castro (1525–1610) cites it only as "some say". The Jews of Marrakesh and Tangier recited it on the synagogue roof, a practice also recorded in Bamberg. One who cannot go outside can recite it while looking through a window, although some write that one should open the window if possible. Solomon Luria would intentionally break with this tradition, reciting it by his window, Avrohom Yeshaya Karelitz and Yaakov Yisrael Kanievsky recited it from covered balconies, and when afflicted with arthritis Judah Obernik recited it without moving from his chair. The Jews of Belmonte would recite Kiddush levana inside their synagogue, as did the Jews of Syracuse, New York. Debra Kaplan argues that the Jews of Frankfurt would likely have exited their ghetto to recite it in the open air, but Aryeh Leib of Binswangen recited it within the Prague ghetto, writing that "If you can tell that the moon is out by its light, but you cannot see it because of buildings or trees in the way, you may recite the blessing towards an empty sky". Obernik recited Kiddush levana even if the moon was mostly covered by clouds, but the common practice of today's Orthodox Jews is to wait for a clear night. Halakhists dispute whether a blind person is obligated to recite the blessing.

Yaakov Yitzchak of Lublin thought one should recite the baraita containing the blessing if the moon was covered on the last night, while Shalom Perloff recommended reciting the blessing without holy names. In 1827, Moses Sofer recited it in Aramaic after the ideal period had elapsed.

A table tracking many halakhic questions relating to Kiddush levana throughout history is given by Arian.

==== Timing ====
David Abudarham (fl. 1340) and Yerucham ben Meshullam (1290-1350) cite an otherwise-unknown midrash that "We only bless the moon at night, as it says 'He appointed the moon for seasons (Ps. 104:19)", and the same ruling is found in period Italian prayerbooks. However, Zedekiah Anaw (c. 1250) refers to this position as a "some say" worthy of casuistic justification. Today, Orthodox Jews only recite Kiddush levana at nighttime, although Yaakov Aryeh Milikowsky has recited it during the day. Shlomo Goren ruled that in polar day conditions, one should recite it at 12:00 AM.

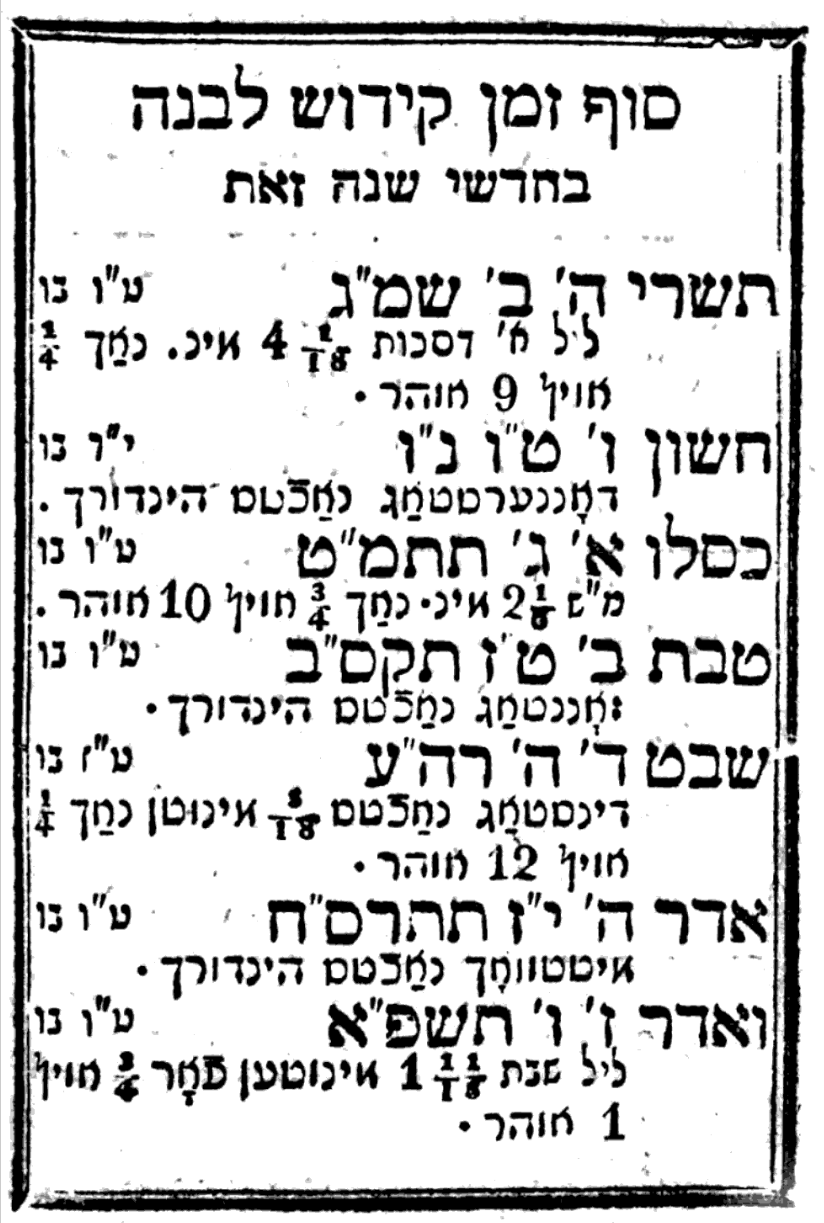
List of latest possible Kiddush levana dates for the first half of the year 5592 AM (1831–1832), from a Prague almanac.

The Rambam and most other rishonim (followed e.g. by Hayim Vital) ruled that the blessing should be recited on the first night of the new moon. Indeed, some say that one should only stand to recite the blessing if it is performed "in its proper time", meaning on the first of the month. However, most modern authorities write that one must wait until three (the position of other rishonim) or seven (Kabbalistic) complete days after the appearance of the new moon. According to others, one should wait five days. Yerucham ben Meshullam writes that it should be ideally performed in the first seven days.

Most halakhists follow Massechet Soferim in ruling that Kiddush levana should be recited at the conclusion of Shabbat, although others prefer reciting it immediately whenever the new moon appears. A responsum attributed to Joseph Gikatilla says to recite Kiddush levana on the seventh day of the month, without waiting for Saturday, and Baruch Epstein writes that one should avoid reciting it on Saturday night. However, if waiting until the conclusion of the Sabbath will make it impossible to recite Kiddush levana before the tenth day of the month, most halakhic authorities rule that it should recited immediately, although some still wait until after the Sabbath if it will be possible to recite it then at all.

Kiddush levana is generally not recited on the eve of a Sabbath or festival, unless it is the last opportunity to do so. This practice likely originated for Kabbalistic reasons, but some say it started because of concern that Jews will break the Sabbath in order to recite it, or because the shekhinah would have to be brought in from beyond the techum, (Note: Note Simeon ben Zemah Duran (2012) [before 1441]. p. 158, "but I do not understand this".) or because it is considered similar to a marriage, and marriages are not performed on the Sabbath, or because texts could not be carried outdoors in the absence of an eruv. If a festival falls on Sunday, Kiddush levana is not performed on Saturday night. Any additional passages normally recited by the community, beyond the Talmudic blessing, should be omitted on the Sabbath.

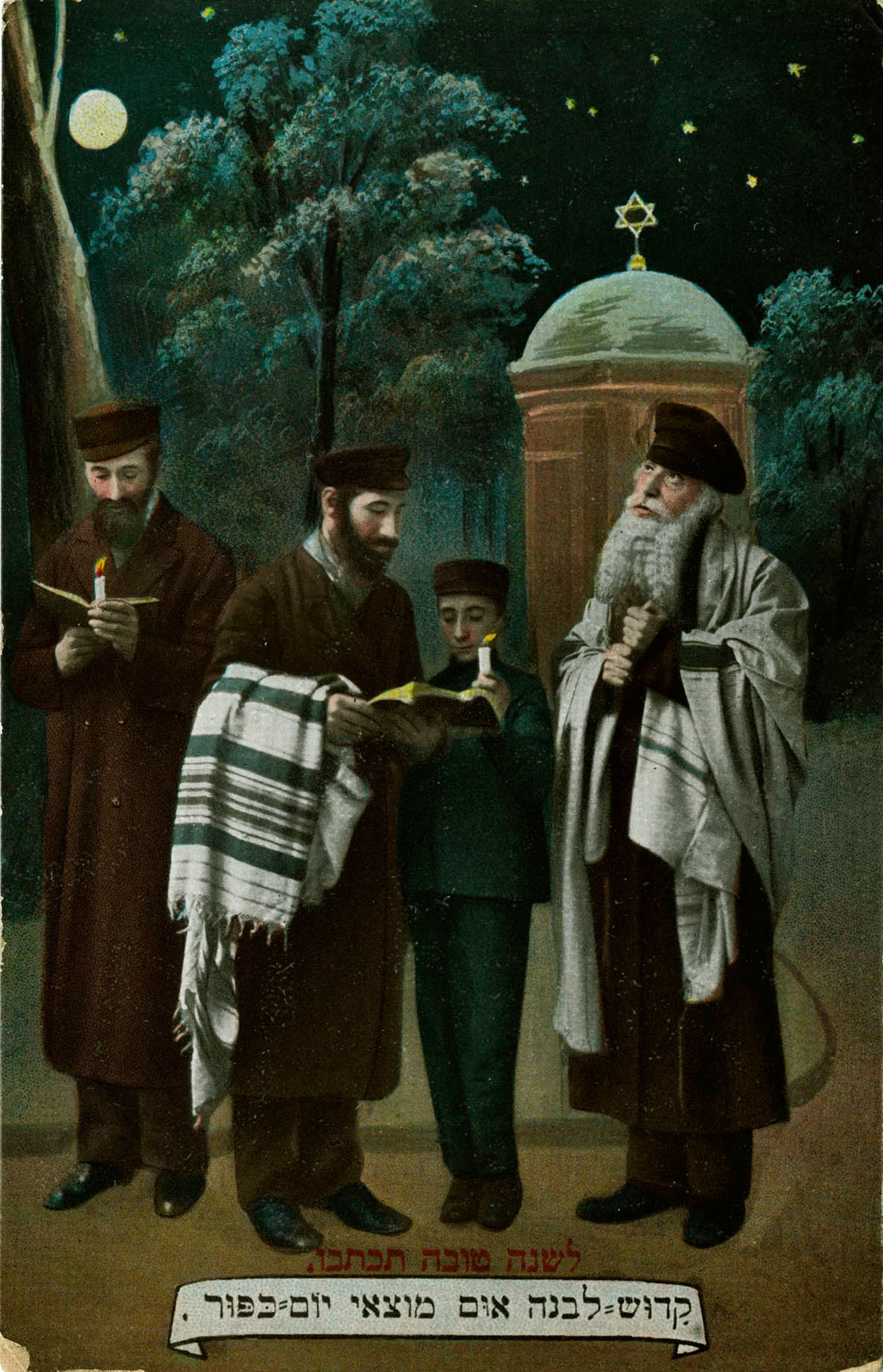
A holiday card shows Ashkenazi Jews reciting Kiddush levana after Yom Kippur (c. 1910)

In the month of Tishrei, most communities delay the recitation of Kiddush levana until after the conclusion of Yom Kippur. One who is too hungry to focus should first break their fast. Others have a custom to say it specifically before Yom Kippur.

In the month of Av, it is traditionally postponed until after the fast of Tisha B'Av, as the beginning of the month is a time of mourning and the ritual is considered joyful. Isserles also bans reciting it immediately after Tisha B'Av ends, considering the mourning period to still be in effect, but most later halakhists only require one to postpone its recitation until after breaking their fast, and others allow it to be recited immediately following the conclusion of Tisha B'Av. Some recite it after Shabbat Nachamu, and the Jews of Frankfurt recited it on 11 Av. To avoid the wet season, Abdallah Somekh permitted Kiddush levana to be recited before Tisha B'Av in Bombay.

The practice of Egyptian Jews was to delay saying Kiddush levana for Tevet until after the fast. Judeo-Spanish and Georgian Jews recite Kiddush levana for Sivan immediately after Shavuot. Sholom Rokeach would not recite Kiddush levana on 7 Adar. Israel Friedman of Chernikov preferred his followers to recite Kiddush levana on 10 Iyyar, his birthday.

The latest time for Kiddush levana is usually said to be when the moon is "filled in", and the amoraim debate whether this means half full (until the seventh of the month) or completely full (mid-month). Normative custom follows the second opinion (mid-month). According to an alternate position in the Yerushalmi, the latest time is "half a cake". Yosef Karo ruled that it can be recited until fifteen days after the molad, but Moses Isserles ruled that it can be recited only until the moon's literal half-way point, i.e. fourteen days, eighteen hours and twenty-two minutes after the molad. Others say it can be recited until the sixteenth day of the month, as the waning of the moon is not yet recognizable, unless a lunar eclipse (which always occurs mid-month) marks mid-month before that. According to the Ta'amei hamitzvot attributed to Joseph of Hamadan (fl. 1300), one can recite Kiddush levana until the twenty-first of the month.

==== Women ====
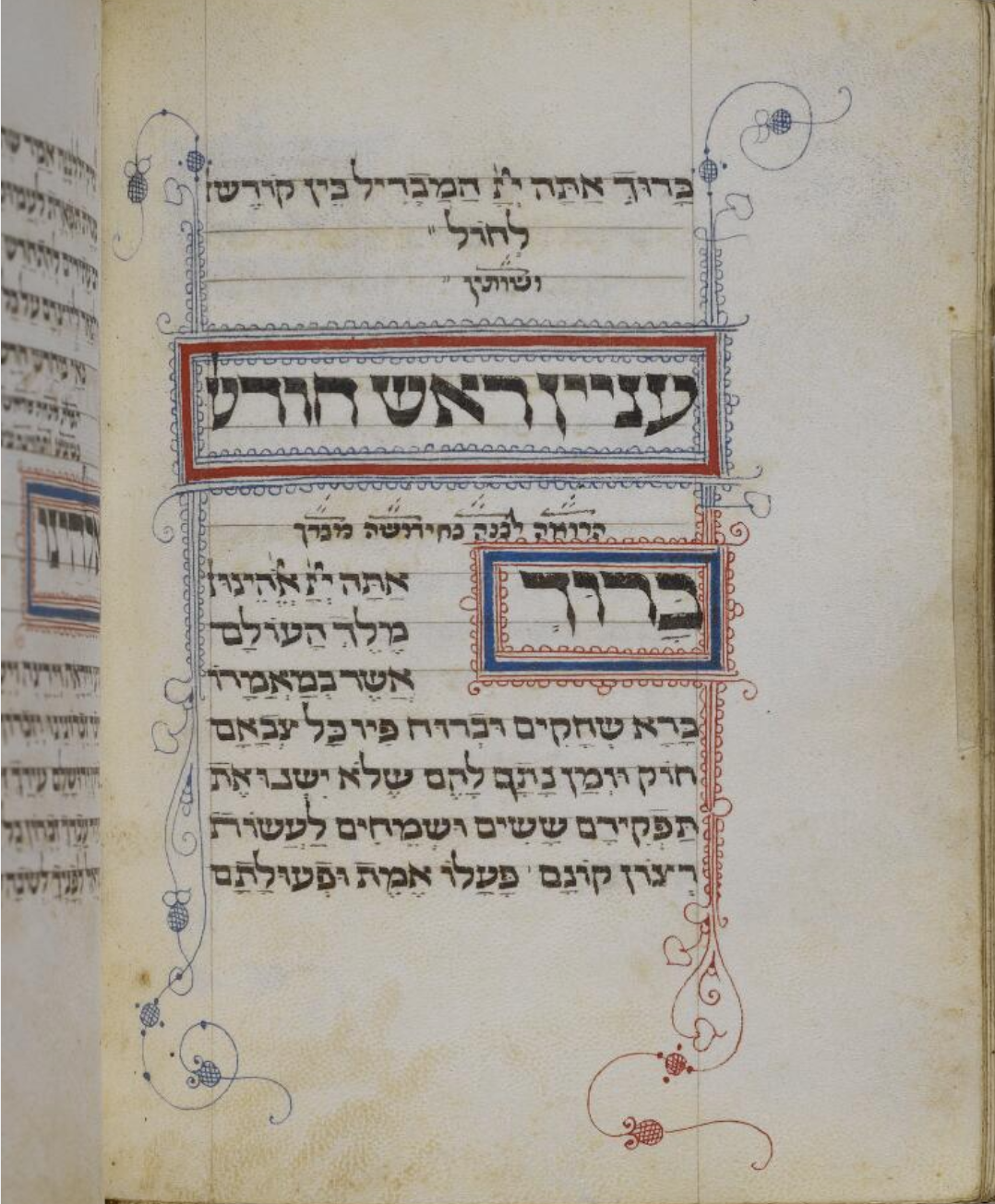
Kiddush levana in 1475 women's mahzor, MS JTS 8641. Three other examples are known: MSS Vienna 86, JTS 8255, Smith Lesouef 250. One is signed by the woman who commissioned it and the others contain the female formula "who did not make me a maidservant".

According to David and Victoria Rosen, the "traditional ritual celebrations of the moon were centered on the activities of men and involved rituals that, for the most part, took place within the male-dominated ritual sphere of the synagogue". Idit Pintel-Ginsburg writes that "An ambivalent relationship exists between women and the first day of the month" because women do not participate in Kiddush levana. Noa Ginzburg understands the ritual as an attempt by men to claim a female moon; according to Arian, "There is a small amount of literary evidence which supports the hypothesis that the moon is used as a feminine symbol".

Women are allowed to perform time-bound positive mitzvot, even though they are not obligated to, and Rav Ashi (352–427) describes women reciting the Kiddush levana blessing in Babylonia. 15th- and 16th-century Italian women's prayerbooks contain Kiddush levana, as do some 18th-century German women's prayerbooks. However, Zevi Hirsch Sundel wrote c. 1600 that "It is not the women's custom to greet the shekhinah; therefore they do not obligate themselves to recite Kiddush levana. Also, they are concerned lest others say they are performing magic". Isaiah Horowitz (1555–1630) observed that "women keep away from Kiddush levana . . . even though many are sure to recite every prayer, they have never observed this commandment". Horowitz speculates that it is instead out of embarrassment for Eve's sin, which according to him was responsible for the lunar cycle, but according to Jacob Zallel Lauterbach, "there is no reason for it". This practice may have developed because women do not usually attend maariv on Saturday night, and therefore aren't at the synagogue when Kiddush levana is recited, or because it is done outdoors, and women did not leave the house, or because women did not understand the calendar. (Note: Modern religious explanations include: That Kiddush levana would be inappropriate self-praise for women, because the moon is feminine itself, that women do not perform time-bound positive mitzvot which are recitations, that women do not perform time-bound positive mitzvot that are performed while standing, that the ritual is joyous and women are cursed with mourning, that it symbolizes the Talmud, to which women have no connection, and that women at Kiddush levana would lead to mixed dancing) Sarit Kattan Gribetz has claimed that women were prevented from participating because of ritual impurity.

Avraham Gombiner cited Horowitz in 1671, and most halakhic authorities, beginning with Joseph Teomim (1787), interpreted Gombiner as prohibiting women from participating in the ritual and ruled likewise. Teomim banned women from reciting it even without invoking a holy name, but many halakhists encourage women to have a man recite it on their behalf or to recite only "Blessed be the one who renewst the months"; however, this is not the general custom.

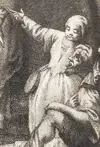
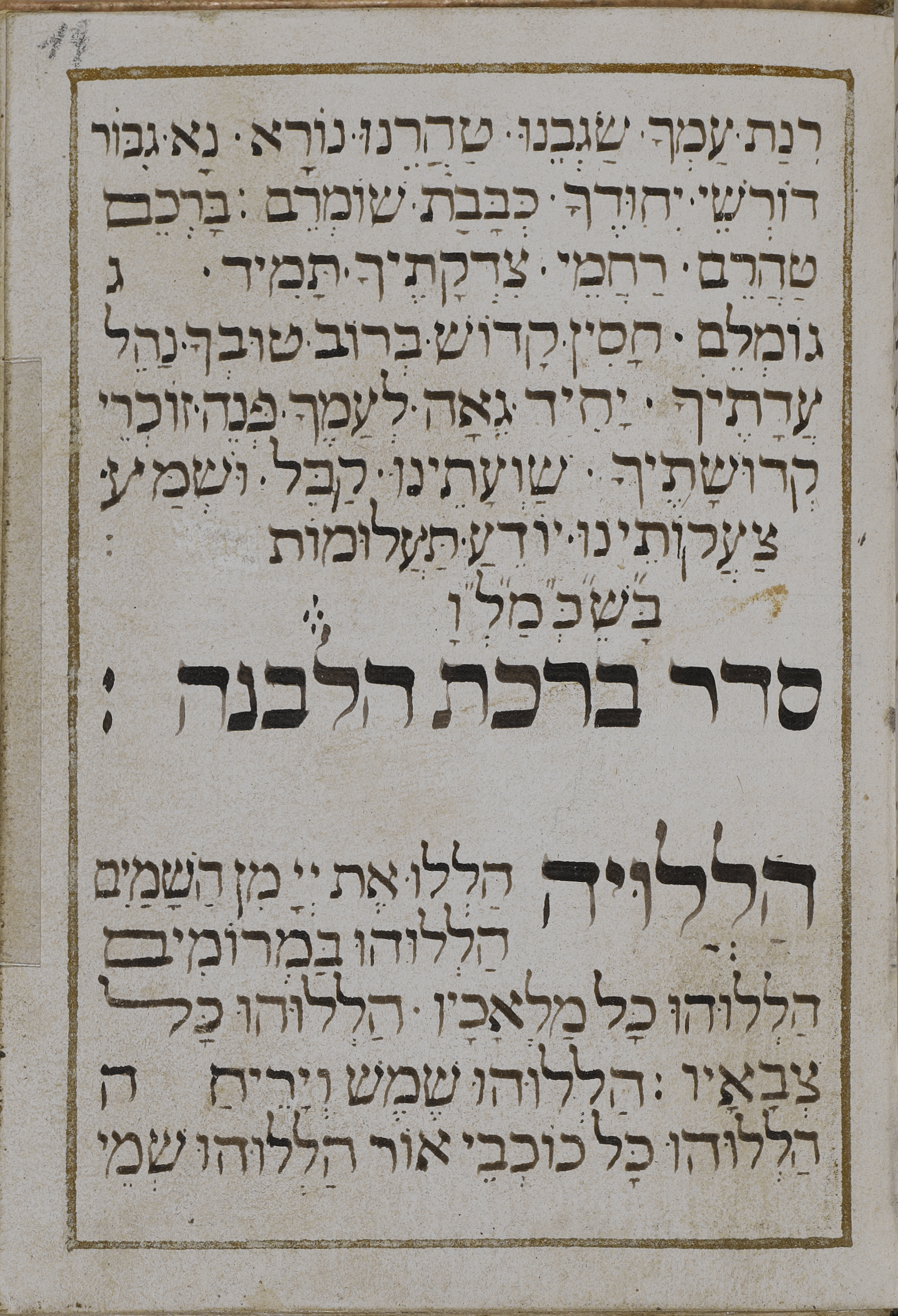
LEFT: A woman participates in Kiddush levana. Giovanni Maria de Pian (Northern Italy, 1786–1800). RIGHT: Kiddush levana in a prayerbook written for Baila of Frankfurt. Simha Pihem Segal (Mannheim, 1736).

Elijah Israel (1715–1784) ruled that it is permitted for women to recite Kiddush levana, as did Benjamin Raphael Hayim Moreno (d. 1802). Yisrael Meir Kagan (1838–1933) writes that "women do not need to perform it", and Ephraim Greenblatt understands him as intending to permit it as a voluntary recitation. Jacob Meshullam Ornstein (1775–1839) permitted "Blessed be the one who renewst the months" even with a holy name, and Menashe Grossberg (1860–1927) permitted women to join in with men who are reciting it, as long as they remain indoors.

Shlomo Kluger (1785–1869) went further, abandoning Horowitz's premise, and explained that women are obligated to perform the mitzvah, because it is dependent on the act of seeing the new moon rather than a particular schedule. Bentzion Lichtman (1892–1964) agreed with Kluger, as did Joseph B. Soloveitchik (1903–1993), at least in theory, as does Hershel Schachter (b. 1941).

Saul Isaac Kaempf included a version of Kiddush levana in every edition (1860, 1875, 1893) of his women's prayerbook. Since 1992, some Chabad women have recited it, although Yosef Simcha Ginzburg disapproves. Re'em Ha'Cohen and Saul David Botschko have ruled that women are permitted to recite it, and the Jewish Orthodox Feminist Alliance advocates for allowing women to both recite it and lead men in the service.

As of 2024, women do not recite Kiddush levana in mainstream Orthodox Judaism, but the question "remains unresolved".

== In non-Orthodox Judaism ==
Kiddush levana is endorsed by Conservative Judaism, Reconstructionist Judaism, and Jewish Renewal. It is particularly popular among practitioners of "earth-based Judaism". Although it remains controversial within Reform Judaism, the ritual has recently been endorsed by Dalia Marx, Sylvia Rothschild, and other Reform leaders.

Since 1976, many non-Orthodox women's groups have adopted Kiddush levana, and non-Orthodox masculine versions began appearing circa 1993. Kiddush levana has been adapted for use in same-sex weddings, coming-out ceremonies, Brit bats, and the 2024 solar eclipse.

Kiddush levana was included in the third edition of The Jewish Catalog. Simcha Paull Raphael and H. P. Frydman created a complex original Kiddush levana ritual in 1980. Everett Gendler and Arthur Green were both attracted to the ritual. Dovid Din and Bahira Feinstein held Hasidic-style Kiddush levanas at Sha'arei Orah (New York). Matthew Biers-Ariel composed a version to be said while hiking. Daniel J. Cayre includes it in his egalitarian Sephardic machzor for Yom Kippur. Congregation Shir Tikvah (Portland, Oregon) recites "Said Rabbi Johanan: Whoever blesses the month in its time, it is like he has welcomed the shekhinah", followed by an original English-language Kiddush levana liturgy. At a non-denominational conference in 2019, "Nearly eighty communal leaders—Orthodox and Reform, Conservative and Renewal, and everything in between and beyond" recited Kiddush levana together.

=== Conservative Judaism ===
Conservative Judaism endorses the recital of Kiddush levana. In 1979, Isaac Klein wrote that Kiddush levana "embodies much that might be appealing to contemporary Jews" and "has a mystic, haunting air about it". However, David Mevorach Seidenberg recalls that, during his rabbinical training at the Jewish Theological Seminary (JTS), "I used to invite fellow rabbinical students to participate in Kiddush levana . . . sometimes people would refuse, calling the ritual 'pagan'".

In 1985, the Rabbinical Assembly included Kiddush levana in the first edition of Siddur Sim Shalom, demonstrating a desire for comprehensiveness but also "the growing influence of mysticism and Hassidism". This original version excluded all Soferim additions except "A good omen . . ." and the exchange of greetings, but "Blessed be your Creator . . ." and "Just as I jump . . ." were restored for the 2002 edition. Originally Kiddush levana in Conservative Judaism could be performed on any weeknight, without a preference for Saturday, but in 2016 the Siddur Lev Shalem explained that "Reciting it . . . immediately upon the conclusion of Shabbat adds to the sense of freshness that the ceremony intends". In 2024, the editors of the Lev Shalem provided their text to At The Well for use in The Way of Blessing the Moon: A Modern Kiddush Levana.

Bradley Shavit Artson called it "surely a celebration worth renewing" in 2006. Hershel Matt "took special delight in performing and promoting" Kiddush levana. A 2016 post from the JTS library states that "Through Kiddush levana ... we reaffirm our commitment to sanctifying time and celebrating the Jewish holidays that are determined by the lunar calendar". According to Daniel Pressman, "It's safe to guess that many [Conservative] Jews have never heard of this service, let alone participated in it. It has experienced a revival . . . in recent years".

=== Reconstructionist Judaism ===
David Teutsch, a leader in Reconstructionist Judaism, describes Kiddush levana as an opportunity to "explore aspects of the Jewish tradition which were associated with women" and that "concern with the environment, and particularly with recycling the good things of the world, flows naturally from our awareness of the recycling of the moon". A completely traditional Kiddush levana is included in Kol Haneshamah: Shirim uvrahot (1998), the American Reconstructionist prayerbook (modified only to include the option of feminine pronouns), and a "large proportion" of Kiddush levana is included in the Canadian Reconstructionist Renew Our Days: A Book of Jewish Prayer and Meditation (1996). Acknowledging that the ritual is rarely observed by modern Jews, Teutsch writes that "the reintroduction of Kiddush Levanah can make us aware of the part of ourselves in rhythm with the moon . . . by reviving this ritual we bring ourselves more closely into contact with the rhythms of nature". Ariana Katz leads Kiddush levana services.

=== Jewish Renewal ===
Some Jewish Renewal congregations recite Kiddush levana, and Arthur Waskow includes it in his ritual guide. Ami Goodman ran musical Kiddush levana meetings in San Francisco the 1990s. Goldie Milgram published separate Kiddush levana rituals for men and women in 2004. The men's version is to be celebrated at the full moon.

Bonna Devora Haberman (1960-2015) led a "creative Kiddush levana" group in Jerusalem, including poetry by Tzemah Yoreh; Aviva Richman and Danya Ruttenberg participated. Haberman's group began as women-only, but later expanded to include men. Ariel Hendelman leads "renewed, chant-based" versions of Kiddush levana. The Siddur halev of Chochmat HaLev (Berkeley, CA) includes a traditional Kiddush levana, as does the Torah of Awakening Mahzor.

=== Reform Judaism ===
After Geiger's public rejection of the modern Kiddush levana in 1837, no Reform prayerbook included any ritual elements for 170 years. The same year, Samuel Holdheim had fully recommended Kiddush levana, and described it as part of his synagogue's regular observance. Although Geiger had endorsed the short form of the blessing, "Blessed be the one who renewst the months", only the 1872 and 1889 editions of Isaac Mayer Wise's Minhag America included it; all other Reform prayerbooks, and all other printings of Minhag America, excluded even that. However, Kaufmann Kohler did include an English version of Judah bar Ezekiel's liturgy in his Guide for Instruction in Judaism (five editions 1898–1924), for which he was criticized by Solomon H. Sonneschein. During this period, Reform—especially in America—generally excised all ritual practice which related to the natural world, and Kiddush levana "fell into oblivion" as Reform Jewish practice.

In 1928, Morris Lazaron published a rhyming version of Judah bar Ezekiel's liturgy for children, "somewhat changed to meet the child's need, the implication of immortality in the ancient form being beyond the child's comprehension".

Blessed art Thou, O Lord our God
Who gave the sun for warmth and light,
The moon and stars that shine at night;
The days and months that make the year;
Watch over all my loved ones dear,
And help us all to do what's right.

— Morris Lazaron's version for children (1928)

Samuel Michel Segal included a completely traditional Kiddush levana in The Sabbath Book (1957). Eric L. Friedlander endorsed reciting the blessing component in 1968, writing that "The prayer's present-day indisposition should not in the least obscure for us its literary excellence and religious feeling . . . Even if we cannot recite the prayer on schedule, we need this prayer . . . if only to impress us that the tannaitic and amoraic compilers of the synagogal liturgy were by no means so immured in their houses of study as to be insensitive to nature's beauties".

In 1977, Gates of the House: The New Union Home Prayerbook included a medley of verses from Psalm 148, (Note: Ps. 148:1, 3, 7–13, and then a modified version of 5-6.) followed by Judah bar Ezekiel's liturgy, as did On the Doorposts of Your House in 1994. The selection of verses "downplays the genre of heavenly prayer while stressing universalist themes involving nature and humanity. It highlights references to animals, the kings of all nations, women and men, young and old. This refocusing moves the ritual away from mystical tropes and toward favorite themes of Reform Judaism". Both also included other blessings for natural phenomena. However, Reform synagogue prayerbooks continued to exclude these blessings, including all parts of Kiddush levana.

In 1996, Jay Rosenbaum attempted to "revive the ancient custom of blessing the moon" at Temple Israel (Lawrence, MA). In 2000, the Union for Reform Judaism printed a Daily Blessings Card, which contained blessings for many natural phenomena, but not for the moon. In 2001, Daniel Fink, acknowledging that Kiddush levana would be "unfamiliar to most liberal Jews", called for its restoration in future Reform prayerbooks. The current American Reform prayerbook, Forms of Prayer (2008), continues to exclude it.

Justin Jaron Lewis recited Kiddush levana every month, and led communal versions on Yom Kippur as rabbi of Congregation Iyr Hamelech (Kingston, Ontario). 2011, the Siddur Pirchei Kodesh of Holy Blossom Temple (Toronto) included a Kiddush levana, comprising Ps. 148:1–6, Judah bar Ezekiel's liturgy, and "The New Moon" by Ruth F. Brin. In 2015, Lisa Green created her own version for a summer camp.

In 2020, Dalia Marx included a largely traditional Kiddush levana in the Israeli Reform Siddur Tefillat haAdam, which became the first Reform prayerbook to contain Soferim's additions. She explained that "Our siddur includes Kiddush levana (somewhat abbreviated) despite the opposition of some rabbis, in recognition of the ritual's rich spiritual and communal significance, and of its potential to bring us closer to experiencing of nature's transitions. Those opposed said that Kiddush levana is a magical practice, but most rabbis were enthusiastic about including the ritual, which includes references to nature, Jewish peoplehood, and in terpersonal relationships". Tefillat haAdam's version includes alternate feminine pronouns and extends "Just as I jump . . ." to ". . . let my enemies, sins, and failings not reach me for harm". According to Eleanor Davis, the inclusion "may reflect Dalia Marx's interest in nature, which is much in evidence in From Time to Time (2023)", although it is also part of a general return to traditional liturgy.

Sylvia Rothschild endorsed Kiddush levana in 2022, writing that "I have taken part in this ritual within a community exactly five times in my life, but each time have become more aware of the praise of nature and of God's role as the creator of nature, which is something that we lose often in our liturgical mainstream". Davis followed in 2024, writing that it "feels remarkably suited to someone attempting to practise a living Judaism in an ever-changing world . . . the absence of Kiddush Levanah seems to be a potentially rich opportunity that has thus far been missed" and suggesting that it be moved to Friday night.

=== Karaite Judaism ===
In 1496, Caleb Afendopolo included a liturgy similar to Judah bar Ezekiel's (additions in italics):

Blessed art thou, Lord our God, King of the universe, who didst create the heavens as a molten looking glass (Note: Job 37:18) and all their host by thy mere word. They are glad and happy when they rise and set (Note: El Adon line 15) to do the will of their Creator. He subjected them to fixed laws and time. He appointed the moon for seasons and months, the sun knoweth his going down. (Note: Cf. Ps. 104:19) Unto you, O men, to sanctify by it the new moons at thirty days. He set a trustworthy witness in the heavens. Blessed art thou, O Lord, who sanctifies His people Israel with the sight of the moon.

Afendopolo writes that one should introduce all occasional blessings with appropriate verses, suggesting Psalm 150 inter alia.

However, printed Karaite prayerbooks contain only much shorter liturgies. One version (attested from 1734) combines the Talmudic "who renewst the months" with Afendopolo's version: "Blessed art thou, Lord our God, King of the universe, who renewst the months and sanctifies His people Israel with the sight of the moon". In light of this, Israel Davidson describes Afendopolo's version as essentially an extension to the Talmudic.

A second version (attested from 1836) is "Blessed art thou, Lord our God, King of the universe, who renewst the months with a good omen for His people Israel and for all the world". This liturgy is uniquely universalistic, referencing "all the world". Both printed versions are significantly shorter than the traditional text, which is unusual for a Karaite prayer.

Although it is ideal to recite Kiddush levana at the very first opportunity, at sunset, Karaites may recite Kiddush levana until the full moon, which Afendopolo defines as "until the fifteenth of the month".

=== Beta Israel ===
Ethiopian Jews historically did not practice Kiddush levana in any form, but Sharon Shalom has encouraged them to begin reciting it in Israel. Shalom writes,

This practice was not followed. (Note: In 2016, the English translation by Jessica Setbon added, "Ethiopian Jews were surrounded by people who worshipped the sun and moon, and were thus very concerned about any prayer that might appear to be doing the same".) It is expressly forbidden to pray to the heavenly bodies—one must pray only to God . . . Nonetheless, Ethiopian Jews must not regard someone who does recite Kiddush levana as an idolator. The Sages attributed great importance to this blessing, and therefore it is recommended that the second generation recite it together with the rest of Israel.

=== Black Hebrew Israelites ===
Both men and women recite Judah bar Ezekiel's liturgy, with the addition of shalom aleikhem after Yom Kippur and Tisha b'Av.

=== Feminist versions ===
In 1976, Arlene Agus included Kiddush levana in her women's Rosh Chodesh ceremony. In the years since, many women's groups have adopted Kiddush levana, but without any standard format. Susan Talve composed a feminist version of the liturgy in 1983. A women's group from Delaware, the Judaism and Feminism Study Group of Jewish Family Service, wrote another version in 1990. Naomi Levy introduced Kiddush levana to her Rosh Chodesh group in November 1991, but there was "very little response from participants". In 1994, the Baltimore "B'not HaLevana" would chant the blessing to music set by Judi Tal. Geela-Rayzel Raphael and Margot Stein-Azen published another version in 1998, including original poetry and music. Debbie Friedman composed "Birkat Halevanah" (1998) for use in women's groups. Marcia Falk published another version of Kiddush levana in 1999, aiming to "retain some of the mystery of the original while also giving expression to Jewish feminist yearnings". At one Rosh Chodesh group,

Moving the heavy coffee table, we spread a tapestry on the floor and lit white candles. In that atmosphere, our voices sounded hushed and holy. We began by singing a wordless melody, and reciting the blessing over the new moon. Miriam's cup was always in the center of our circle. At first, we used a plain glass, until someone's aunt (a potter) donated a ceramic goblet adorned with a dancing woman. We passed the cup around the circle, taking small sips of water. Each woman recited her own name . . .

==== Kohenet ====
A Kohenet co-led Birkat kohanim at a 1980 Kiddush levana ritual. In 2016, Jill Hammer "rededicate[d] this prayer to Asherah" in the first Siddur haKohanot, presenting a modified version of Judah bar Ezekiel's liturgy addressed to that goddess. Harriette Wimms added Kiddush levana to her regular liturgy in 2021, and Naomi Azriel led a musical Kiddush levana with Ariel Hendelman in 2024. In 2025, the second edition of Siddur haKohanot introduced an entirely different version, including Ps. 148:1–6, a modified version of Judah bar Ezekiel's liturgy addressed to the shekhinah, "Blessed be your Creator . . ." (modified to address a female object), "Long live David . . .", the exchange of greetings, and "A good omen . . ."

=== Masculine versions ===
Beginning c. 1993, Shawn Zevit, Kerry Olitzky, and other liberal rabbis led specifically masculine versions of Kiddush levana. According to the liberal masculine reinterpretation, "Kiddush Levanah allows men to greet the David—the poet, scholar, dancer, lover, shepherd—in themselves". Two different men's versions were published in 2010, one by Olitzky and another by David E. Levy. Both Levy and Olitzky see celebrating Kiddush levana as an opportunity for men to reclaim part of Rosh Chodesh, so strongly associated with women in non-Orthodox Jewish practice, and to stand up a masculine equivalent of women's Rosh Chodesh groups. According to Olitzky, "A growing number of men's groups have adopted the ritual, because they desire to engage in a monthly ritual of personal renewal . . . some men's groups like to incorporate study".

In 2024, according to Eleanor Davis, the masculine versions "seem[ed] to have disappeared without trace". Noah Phillips and David Steuer began leading masculine Kiddush levana groups at Chochmat HaLev (Berkeley, CA) in 2025.

== Adaptation ==
In 1804, David Hizkiyahu Baruh Louzada incorporated the reversed Ex. 15:16 into a prayer for protection from Maroon attacks on Suriname.

In 1985, Yehuda Etzion used Judah bar Ezekiel's liturgy in his revivals of the Talmudic ritual to declare a new month; these were poorly attended.

=== In non-Orthodox Judaism ===
Kiddush levana is a useful ritual base for feminists because it "immediately follows Rosh Chodesh . . . It would be counterproductive to add another ritual to Rosh Hodesh, which would compete with the already existing rituals". Davis argues that Kiddush levana adaptations should always include the Talmudic blessing, and that it is particularly suited to "renewal that follows diminution or loss, and to periods of flux or change". She suggests integrating it into rituals for "those embarking on another round of fertility treatments after an unsuccessful round, undertaking job applications after redundancy, or while preparing to formalise a new relationship after divorce or being widowed. Other more general opportunities might arise in order to recognise things in progress but not yet completed, or anywhere that growth and shrinkage form part of a natural cycle."

Brit bat ceremonies which integrate Kiddush levana differ intentionally from those that mimic Brit milah by following 8 days after the birth, choosing instead to elevate the lunar calendar. The two "go well together because both are welcoming ceremonies, and both express wishes for completion". In July 1986, the naming ceremony Ellen Sandler and Dennis Danziger held for their daughter Molly involved Laura Geller reciting Kiddush levana; Geller soon publicly suggested "celebrating the entrance of a daughter into the covenant as part of the lovely Blessing of the Moon" and published a liturgy in 1994 under the title "Seder brit kiddush levanah". In 2002, inspired by Geller, "Greg and Carolyn Priest-Dorman of Poughkeepsie, NY, wanted to create their own ceremony for the birth of Leora Rose . . . They timed their celebration to coincide with the Birkat HaLevanah . . . which they 'felt had achieved the perfect balance of traditional Jewish ritual with the almost universal human equation of women and the cycles of the moon'". Miriam Hyman published a different combined Kiddush levana-Brit bat ritual in 1993.

In 1986, Lois Dubin used Kiddush levana in a post-miscarriage ritual, as did Haviva Ner-David in 2007. In 1993, E. M. Broner and Sue Levi Elwell used Kiddush levana in their reordination ceremony for the Berkeley Women's Rabbinical Network. Jason Klein "set the ceremony to be used as a coming-out ritual in which the ritual is embellished with explicit words of queer storytelling and empowerment" in 2001. Steven Greenberg suggested reciting Kiddush levana at same-sex weddings in 2009, arguing that "The mystical prayer for the restoration of the moon serves as a foil to the degradations of the biblical creation story that unconsciously inhabit the traditional wedding". Debora S. Gordon reused parts of Kiddush levana for a solar eclipse ritual in 2024.

== Superstitions ==
According to Israel Abrahams, in the Middle Ages, "Blessing on the moon . . . in origin tainted with no superstitious implications, was seized upon by the mystics and emphasized into full blown superstition". Other scholars consider the Soferim ritual superstitious; compare §Development, above. Eleanor Davis notes that there are no "scientific proofs of its effectiveness in bringing about these happy consequences, which may nonetheless be little deterrent to those who believe in them". The editor of Der Tog admonished readers in 1937, "these beliefs are against the Jewish spirit. Jews should properly be a holy people, a sacred nation, free from the superstitions attached to Kiddush Levana".

The most popular beliefs are that Kiddush levana protects a Jew for the rest of the month and that it is an omen of good luck. These superstitions are probably connected to non-Jewish Eastern European folk custom, which likewise held that the new moon brings prosperity and that one can avoid death that month by greeting it with the correct liturgy. As noted above, a much older tradition held that Psalms 121 and 67 have protective power, although Psalm 67 is not attested in Kiddush levana until 1693. According to a medieval Christian treatise from the Rhineland, one should recite Psalm 16 at the new moon to be "blessed for the entire month".

=== As an omen ===
Joseph Karo (1488-1575) relayed from his maggid that "This omen is observable in Kiddush levana. If you are able to recite it on Saturday night, you will find success. But if the moon is covered and you are not able to recite it, then you will not be successful." A superstition, following Karo, holds that it is bad luck be unable to recite Kiddush levana because of clouds. "It is a token of God's displeasure, and wars, famines, and diseases may be expected". Sasson Mordecai Shinduch writes that "one's prayers are known to be unwelcome". One rabbi declared a penitential fast after clouds prevented the community from reciting it. Some go to extreme lengths to recite Kiddush levana despite cloudy conditions. Alexander Süsskind of Grodno (1739–1794) composed a prayer for clear skies, and Shmelke of Nikolsburg (1726–1778) was said to have died after being unable to recite Kiddush levana. Many kabbalists are said to have miraculously parted the clouds for Kiddush levana. Aryeh Leib of Binswangen modified it slightly in 1724, writing that "All who reject this commandment, or neglect to perform it, will not be successful in that month". The other side of Karo's statement, that reciting it leads to success, is also found in later tradition. However, Chaim Elazar Spira wrote in 1930 that "If you look at this statement in context, it's obvious that the maggid's words were only meant for Karo, and do not apply to anyone else . . . it has no significance whatsoever".

=== As a monthly protection ===
Sometime before 1628, stories of Kiddush levana's mystical power to save travelers began to circulate in Eastern Europe (see §Folklore). These stories, together with Karo's omen, which was first printed in 1646, quickly expanded into a set of related superstitions; the most popular, appearing as early as Hayyim Buchner's Or hadash (1671) in the name of "Moses Meisels of Krakow", was that "One who recites kiddush levana will not die for the rest of that month". This is already cited as "a tradition brought down from our forebears" by the Hemdat yamim (1731), and Aryeh Leib of Binswangen wrote in 1724 that "all who perform it will not suffer any strange death that month, nor will any demon harm him". In 1840, Erasmus Scott Calman described, "No Rabbinical Jew whatever has any doubt of the truth of all this, and places implicit confidence in the efficacy of its operation. Their minds are generally in the greatest anxiety lest a natural or a violent death should overtake them, from the close of the month till the time of the performance of this ceremony has arrived, when they begin to feel secure and relieved." Pinchas Eliyahu Horowitz wrote in 1818, "All are confused by this . . . many people recite Kiddush levana and then die during the following month . . . two words have been transposed, and it should be, one will not be killed by another man, i.e. by robbers or enemies or in war". This popular explanation, which holds closer to the original folklore, is, however, rejected by Sholom Mordechai Schwadron, who writes instead that "it only works sometimes". Aaron Worms (1831) wrote, "They have published deceitful lies, and guaranteed that Kiddush levana will protect against death that month. But many object to this, and they have the right of it, for I have seen pious men die after reciting Kiddush levana faithfully".

=== Others ===
Less popular superstitions include:

- Kiddush levana can help a man get married. First found in Nahman of Breslov's Sefer haMiddot (1811).
- It can cure tooth pain and other ailments. See above for folk beliefs regarding tooth pain and fever cures, and for the use of psalms as cures. Menashe Grossberg argues that Kabbalists had long believed in the power of "greeting the shekhinah" to cure ailments.
- Shaking one's garments after the ritual protects against enemies.
- Music and dancing during the ritual hastens the eschaton.
- It helps with fertility.
- If a woman listens to Kiddush levana, she will suffer pregnancy complications.

== In culture ==
Józef and Szloma wander through a crowd of Ashkenazi Jews reciting Kiddush levana in The Hourglass Sanatorium (1973), 1:21:40.

Kiddush levana has appeared in modern music, poetry, and prose fiction. Artists have depicted the ritual for centuries, in paintings, woodcuts, engravings, and manuscript illuminations. Many Jewish folktales are told regarding it, and it features in Yiddish jokes. The proverb "one must be mekadesh the levana when it stands" is a Jewish parallel to "strike while the iron is hot". Kiddush levana is depicted in The Hourglass Sanatorium (1973), a Polish surrealist film directed by Wojciech Jerzy Has.

Kiddush levana inspired Ary Abramovich Sternfeld to become a rocket scientist. It was also Ludwig Jesselson's favorite mitzvah. He "used to proudly recall all the different places he had bentched the new moon: across the United States, Europe, Israel, and even on a ship in the middle of the ocean. Said [Mendy] Jesselson, 'Kiddush levana represented a new beginning to him, a monthly reminder to do the things that we want to do and haven't yet done.'"

Hai veKayyam, an Israeli ultranationalist movement founded in the late 1970s, chants "Long Live David, King of Israel" during marches through the Old City of Jerusalem.

=== Music ===
Debbie Friedman ("Birkat Halevana"), Geela-Rayzel Raphael ("Sun, Moon, and Stars" and "Schechinah Moon"), Ariel Root Wolpe ("Kiddush levana"), and Yosef Hayyim ("Simhu na bevirkat halevana") composed religious songs for use in Kiddush levana. Shlomo Carlebach wrote music for the ritual, as has Rachel Chang, and Nissan Spivak published several compositions for the ritual. Judie Tal released "Kiddush Hal'vana" in Path Across the Sky (1993) and Lipa Schmeltzer released a "Kiddush levana" in Letova (2001), as did Ariel Hendelman in Prayers for Fire & Water (2023); Avraham Fried uses the Kiddush levana liturgy in "Keshem she'ani roked", part of Bracha v'Hatzlacha (1995). Avraham Yaakov Saftlas released "Kiddish Levuneh" in 2024. Other tunes have been composed for David Melekh Yisrael and Siman Tov uMazel Tov.

Trotwood Eberhardt composed music for part of Morris Rosenfeld's "Kidesch-lewone" in 1914. Reuben Doctor wrote a Yiddish piano and voice composition called "The rabbi is blessing the moon" in 1923.

Jacob Picheny, Naomi Puro, and Jeffrey Weinstein choreographed "Dance of the New Moon", which was performed to music in masks at one 1980 Kiddush levana. The premier of Shlomo Bar and the Natural Gathering's musical pageant "Birkat halevana" closed out the World Organization of North African Jewry's 1983 Knas Shoreshim; it aired on Channel 2 in 1987. The Renaissance Players performed a "secular, folkloric version of the triple-leap moon dance" as part of their adaption of "Yo Hanino" in Sephardic Experience II: Apples & Honey (1998). Dalit Warshaw composed "Kiddush ha-Levanah", a 17-minute adaptation of the liturgy for soprano and piano, in July 2002.

=== Poetry ===
Many modern poems have featured Kiddush levana. Baruch Placzek's "Kidusch Lewanah" (1867) aimed to cohere the modern Kiddush levana's many components. Jacob Schwanthaler's "Kidusch Hallebanah" (1868) adapts a short story by Marcus Lehmann. Shlomo Zalman Luria's "Kiddush levana" (1869), Morris Rosenfeld's "Kidesch-lewone / The Moon Prayer" (1898), and D. B. Suller's "Kiddush levana" (1899) compare it, with melancholy, to ordinary life. Heinrich Gottlieb's "Kiddusch lewanah" derides the ritual as attracting Christian scorn. Naftali Herz Imber composed a series of poems, Hiddot minni qedem (1899), about Kiddush levana and his theory of its development. Gabriel Preil alludes to the ritual in "Notes on an Ancient Parchment", as does Yehuda Amichai in "Gods Change, Prayers Are Here to Stay". Gerson Rosenzweig published an epigram about Kiddush levana in 1903, as did Gertrud Simon Marx in 1919, and A. M. Klein interpreted it in "The Benediction of the New Moon". Itzik Manger retells the Chelm moon story in "Khelemer balade" (1929). Fania Kruger's prize-winning "Blessing the New Moon" (1937) recounts witnessing the ritual. Chaim Grade's "Kiddush levana" was published in 1935, and Nachum Bomze wrote "Kiddush levana" in 1945. Meir Bosak published Berikud keneged halevana, a series of reflections on Hasidism, in 1960.

Rachel Ray Faust was inspired by the Apollo moon landing to write "Blessing the New Moon in the Wintertime" (1969), in which she concludes "The Jews are / The oldest astronauts". Ruth Finer Mintz finishes Traveler Through Time (1970) with a mournful poem called "Kiddush Levana". F. T. Prince (1974) wrote an epigram about a rabbi who dies after reciting it. Isaac Mozeson wrote a sestina, "Kiddush halevana" (1981). Rod Myer wrote "Kiddush Levanah – States of Light" (1996). Pinny Bulman published "Blessing the Moon" in 2015. Stanley Moss's "New Moon" describes Kiddush levana as "night prayers for unconscious sins and new beginnings". Harriette Wimms composed a poem "on the occasion of [her] first Kiddush levana" titled "Moon Mother" (2021). Jenna Nesky published "Kiddush Levana — for S." in October 2024, for which she has been nominated as a "2025 Best New Poet" by Glass: A Journal of Poetry.

Simon Péchi (c. 1575–1642) adapted Judah bar Ezekiel's liturgy to Hungarian verse. Joseph Goldschmidt adapted Kiddush levana to German verse in 1901, and Morris Lazaron published an English rhyming version, intended for children, in 1928. In 1999, Marcia Falk published "What Calls You Home", "Renewal of the Moon", a translation of Dahlia Ravikovitch's "Halevana bageshem" ("Moon in the Rain"), and an original Hebrew poem, "Hithadshut halevana" ("Renewal of the Moon"), for use in her version of Kiddush levana. Ode à la lune (2016) includes a translation of the liturgy and original poetry by Julien Grassen Barbe, together with illustrations by Frank Lalou. The Way of Blessing the Moon: A Modern Kiddush Levana (2024) includes a unique verse blessing for each Hebrew month. Thirteen female and non-binary poets were selected to contribute a blessing, out of dozens that applied.

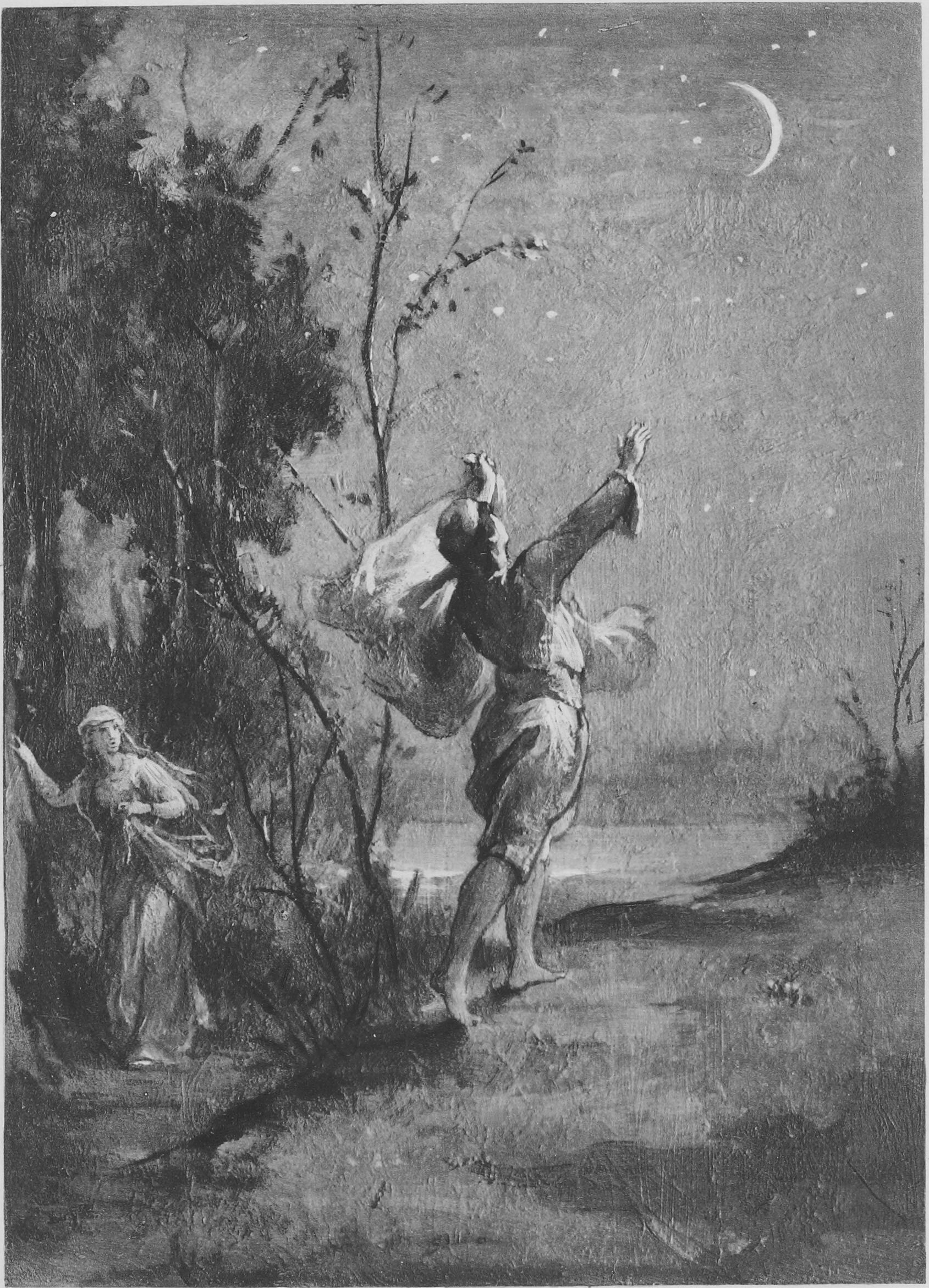
Zamira was amazed to see her slave standing with his face toward the moon. Henri-Léopold Lévy (1891).

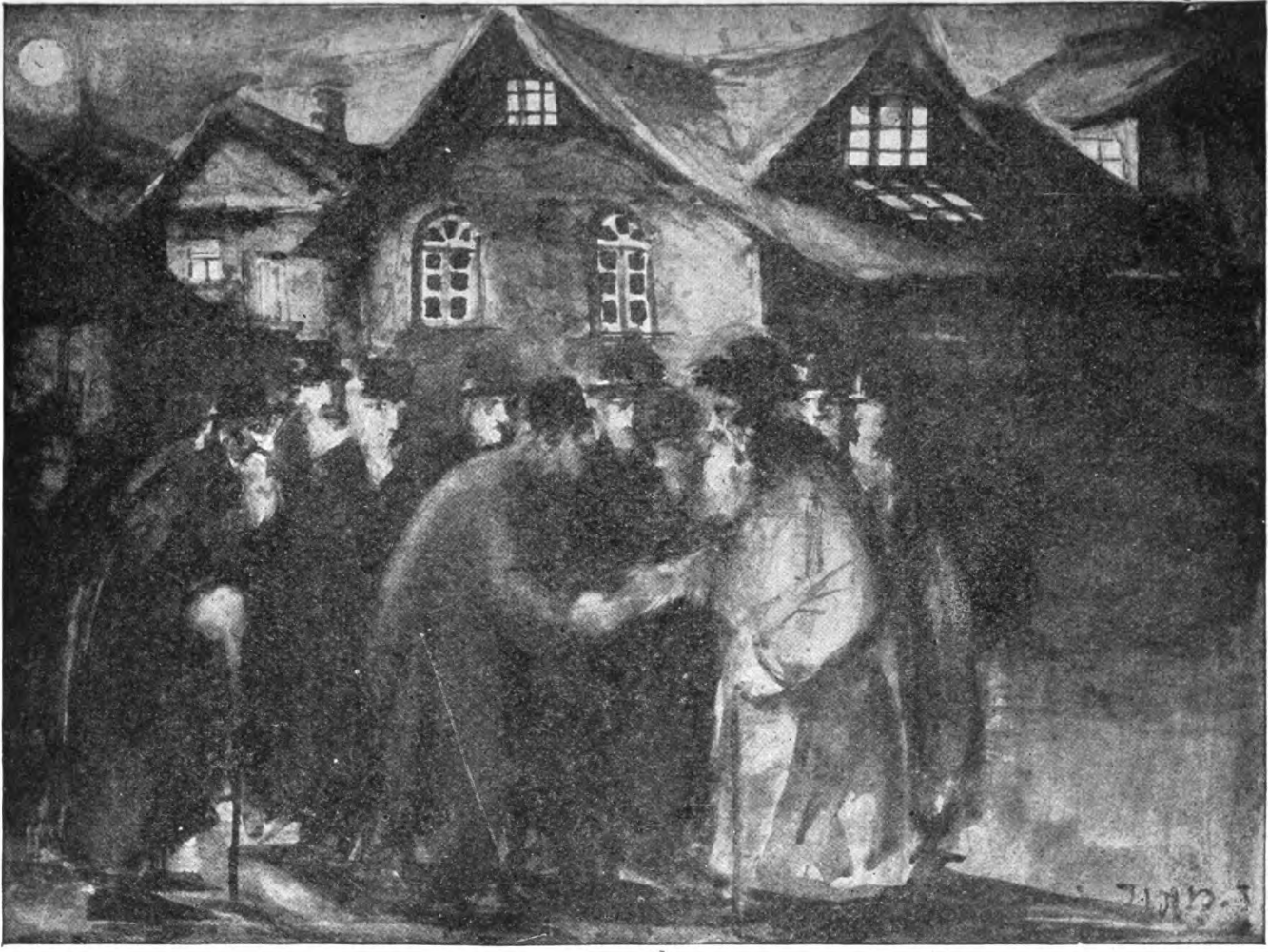
Everyone was shocked to recognize Berel Prager. Zuni Maud (1918). (Note: See also version with superimposed image here (Retrieved March 23, 2025 – via Wayback Machine).)

=== Prose ===
Kiddush levana has also inspired prose fiction. In Marcus Lehmann's "Kiddusch Hallebanah" (1866), the ritual summons a lightning strike on antisemitic highwaymen. Leopold von Sacher-Masoch wrote a short story, "The Blessing of the New Moon" (1892), about a Jewish slave named Naome who unites with his master, Zamira, over Kiddush levana. In David Frischmann's "Kiddush levana" (1896), a rabbi dies after reciting Kiddush levana, causing the narrator a crisis of faith. Chava Shapiro wrote a sketch called "Kiddush levana" (1909), about a young girl who attempts to join her brothers at the ritual. Israel Osman's "Kiddush levana" and "De levana" (1909) mock Hasidic belief in miracles associated with the ritual. Sholem Aleichem's "Kiddush levana" (1917; abridged in English as "The Krushniker Delegation") is "a variation of the Joseph and Benjamin story from Genesis and at the same time shows the limitations of Jewish political efforts in World War I". Reuven Avinoam published "Kiddush levana" (1918) at the age of 13. In David Ignatoff's "In Levone-land" (1918), a pious Jew named Berel Prager has fantastical adventures on his way to Kiddush levana. Micha Josef Berdyczewski published two Kiddush levana sketches in 1921, and Shamai Haber published "Kiddush levana" in 1929. József Patai reflects before a surgery in "Blessing on the Moon" (1952). Levi-Yitzchak Frenkel's "Kiddush levana" appeared in 1955.

Shmuel Yosef Agnon's story "Birkat halevana" (before 1970) focuses on a Kiddush levana poster. In Haim Hazaz's "Hu Tzivah" (1974), childhood memories of Kiddush levana recall a Bolshevik to Judaism. Zalman Schachter-Shalomi asks whether Kiddush levana can be recited in a dream in "Blessing the Moon" (1989). Chaim Walder included a parable titled "Kiddush Levana" in Kids Speak 3 (1997), about a child who learns to embrace returning prayerbooks after Kiddush levana. Joseph Skibell's debut novel A Blessing on the Moon (1997) takes its title from Kiddush levana, which it uses to "provide a cause for hope", evoking "significantly and potentially restorative symbolic meaning". The ritual forms a recurring motif in Haim Sabato's Adjusting Sights (1999; trans. Hillel Halkin 2003). Kiddush levana inspired Esther Takac to write Loni and the Moon (2003), an illustrated children's book. A. P. Miller reflects on the ritual in "Blessing the New Moon" (2006), a short story. Astronauts debate the ritual's future off-planet in Joseph Helmreich's "Kiddush Levana on the Moon" (2023).

In 1869, Hermann Schapira wrote a spoof Talmudic dialogue mocking Hasidic celebration of Kiddush levana. Shawn Zevit recommends liberal masculine Kiddush levana in "Kohelet Rabbah: Wisdom and My Brothers" (2003), which he calls a "21st-Century Men's Midrash". Eleanor Davis composed original English-language midrash about Kiddush levana in 2024, under the title Pesiqta Achot Ketanah.

=== Art ===
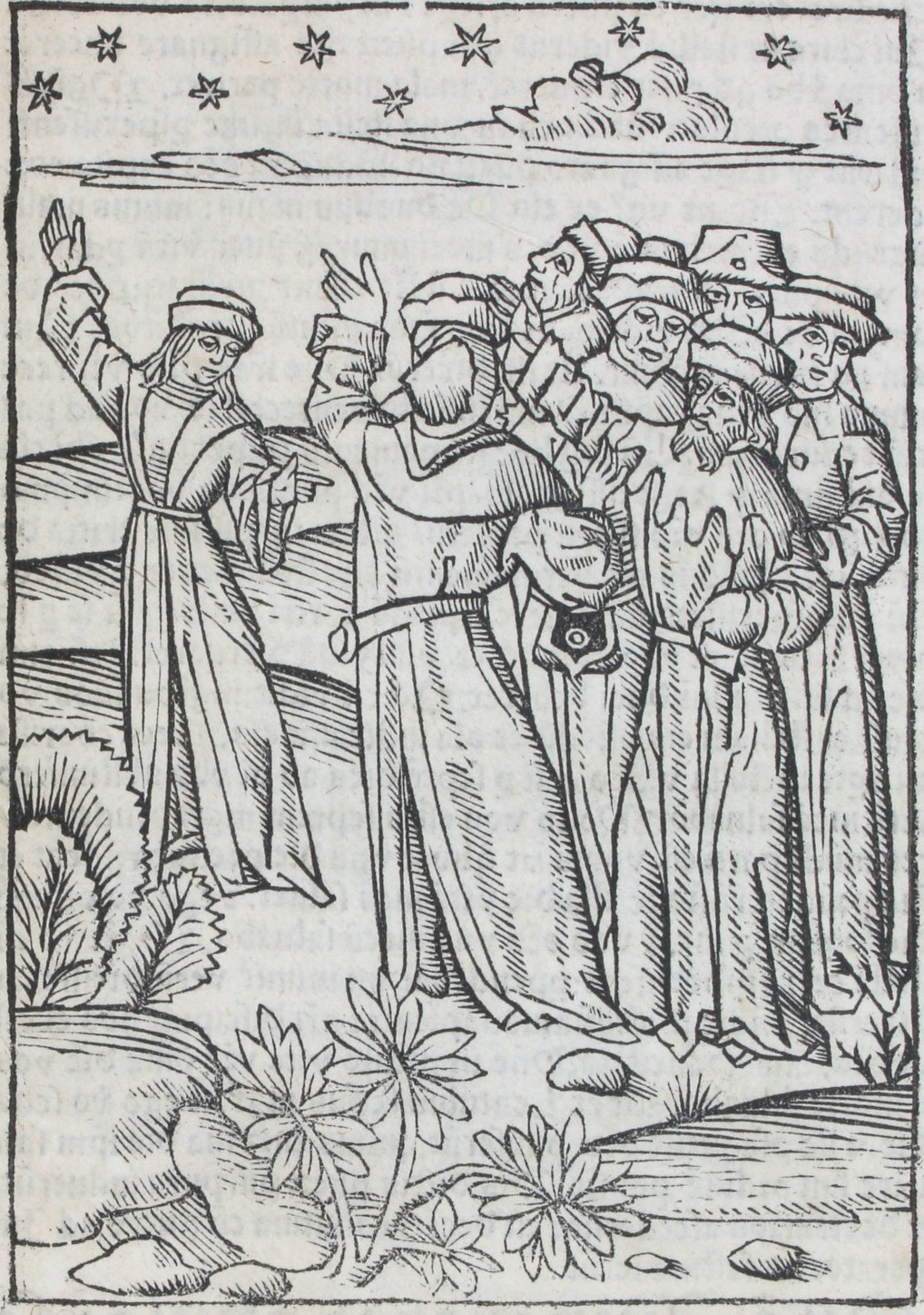
Cologne, 1490

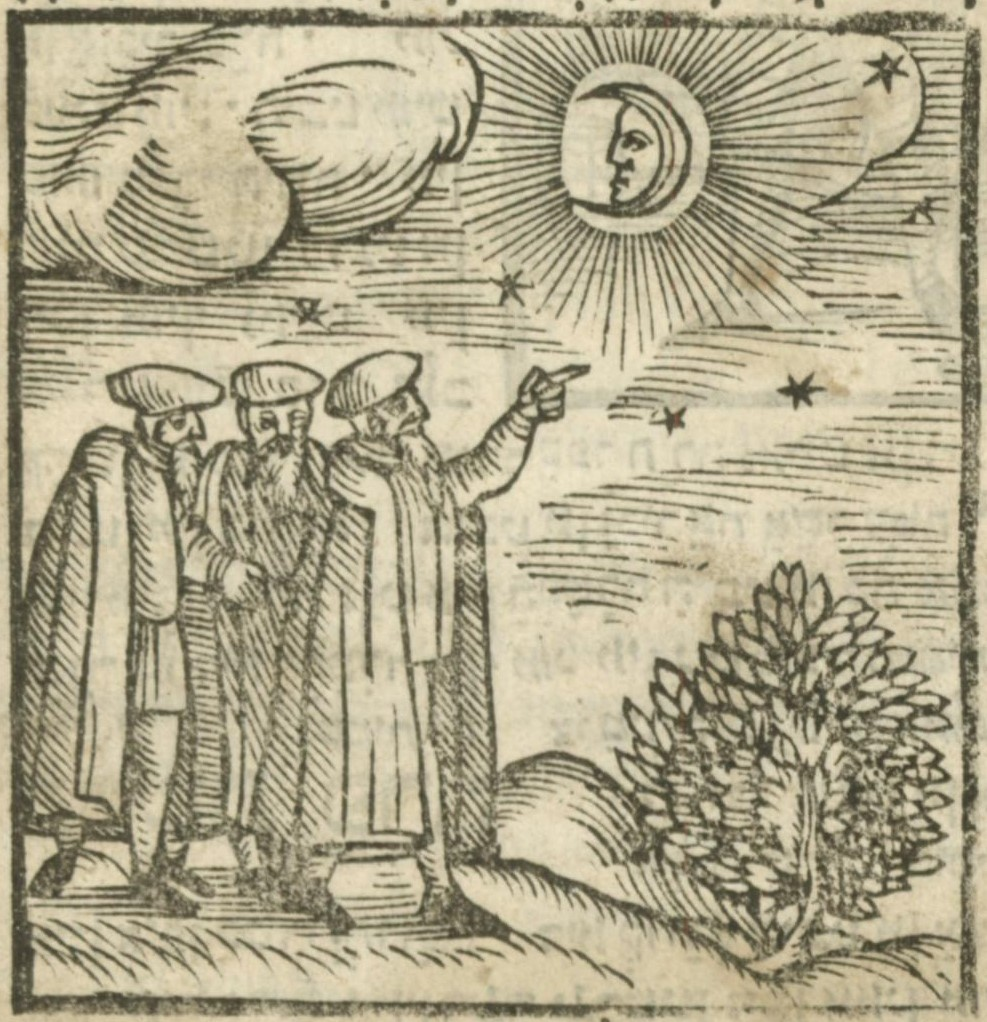
Venice, 1593 (Note: A similar image appears in MS Paris 586, a Yiddish manuscript produced before 1503, on f. 78v with the incomplete caption אִיז נַאַכְט מַן מַג וואל אוֹרַן [די]א שְׁטַעְרַן זִיין אִם הִימַל, ". . . is night. One may well pray. Stars are in the sky". Diane Wolfthal has called it the "most unusual image of synagogue ritual" in that manuscript. The surrounding text relates to Sukkot, and Wolfthal writes that it "cannot represent the blessing of the moon" but must instead show men realizing that night has fallen before returning to the synagogue for Maariv. Ibid. (2004). Picturing Yiddish. pp. 41-42, 236. This 1593 woodcut has been reinterpreted in Mark Podwal's Blessing the New Moon, a digitial archival pigment print on paper. See here. Retrieved March 6, 2025 – via Skirball Museum.)

Early woodcuts of astrologers inspired depictions of Kiddush levana.

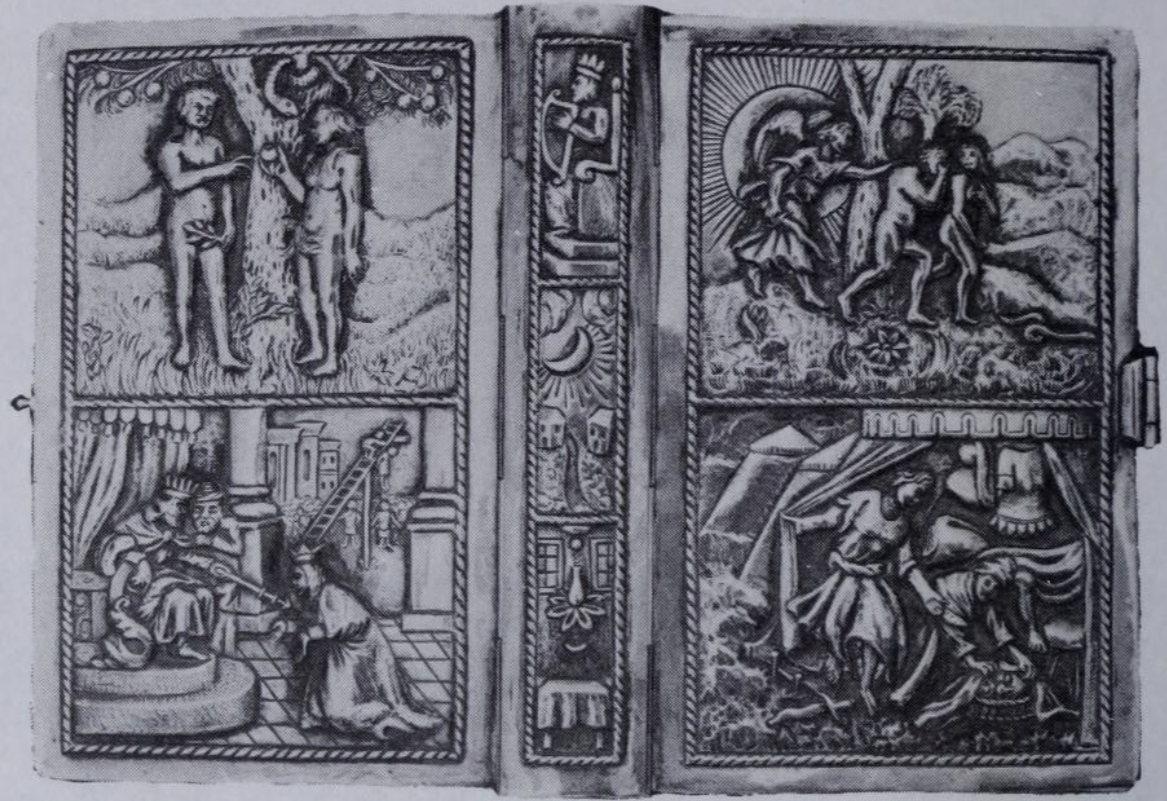
Silver cover for a prayerbook (Amsterdam, 1726) with engravings copied from earlier works. In the center of the spine is part of a Kiddush levana depiction.

One 13th-century Italian prayerbook decorates Kiddush levana with a moon accompanied by a series of ladders in a field of stars. Portrayals of Kiddush levana are particularly common in 15th-century Italian liturgical manuscripts, which often show a silver crescent moon. Starting in the 16th century, the ritual appeared in European woodcuts and engravings, and many illuminations survive from the 18th century Jewish illuminated prayerbook revival. The form of these depictions follows a template established by early woodcuts of astrologers, and they generally include an anthropomorphic moon, which had been adopted from Christian art in the 13th century. The participants wear Sabbath finery, as instructed by Soferim. They stand outdoors, as recommended since the 13th century. Stars are shown along with the moon, to link Kiddush levana to the end of the Sabbath (which is determined by the appearance of stars), and to symbolically link the Sabbath and Kiddush levana "to one another as tokens of gratitude for the weekly and monthly cycles of time". Partial cloud cover is included in reference to the threat that clouds will obscure the moon, but the sky is always shown clear enough to allow for Kiddush levana to be recited. Some 18th-century illuminations show a group of ten men, an exact minyan. Some depictions of moon divination on Hoshana Rabbah have been misattributed to Kiddush levana by reference works.

Kiddush levana appeared on many fin de siècle holiday cards, and on a 2016 Russian postage stamp. Notable modern artists have depicted Kiddush levana, including Yitzhak Frenkel, Joseph Budko, Max Weber, Lionel S. Reiss Emanuel Glicen Romano, Hendel Lieberman, Zalman Kleinman, Moshe Castel Zvi Malnovitzer, Elena Flerova, Jerzy Duda-Gracz, Boris Shapiro, Simcha Nornberg, Shmuel Bonneh, Israel Hershberg, Ezekiel Schloss, Reuven Rubin, Haim Goldberg, Tadeusz Popiel, Hermann Junker, Jacob Steinhardt, and Artur Markowicz. (Note: One 1904 text from Isfahan is decorated with depictions of saint-graves in Israel and Iran, including the tomb attributed to Serah, which Iranian Jews used as a protective charm. It has been inaccurately described as a "Birkat halevana", but actually contains only the Rosh Chodesh mussaf. Reproduced in Bialer, Yehuda L. (1975). Jewish Life in Art and Tradition. p. 136.)

In 1986, Menahem Berman created Hallelujah, being a clock for Kiddush levana, which is an electronic device that displays the current moon phase by illuminating one of 30 masked lenses on a silver dial. Psalm 148 is engraved on its base in Merubah, a late 18th-century prayerbook typeface.

Noa Ginzburg's MFA thesis, Kiddush Levana, The Moon Is Your Handheld Mirror (2019), aimed "to disarm anthropocentric points of view and speak of temporality and displacement".

A selection of out-of-copyright works is available in the §Gallery, below.

=== Folklore ===
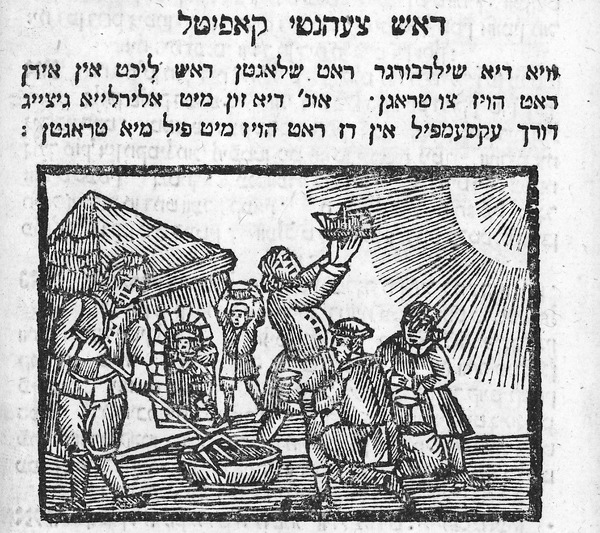
Carrying Sunlight Into the Town Hall of Schilda (1727)

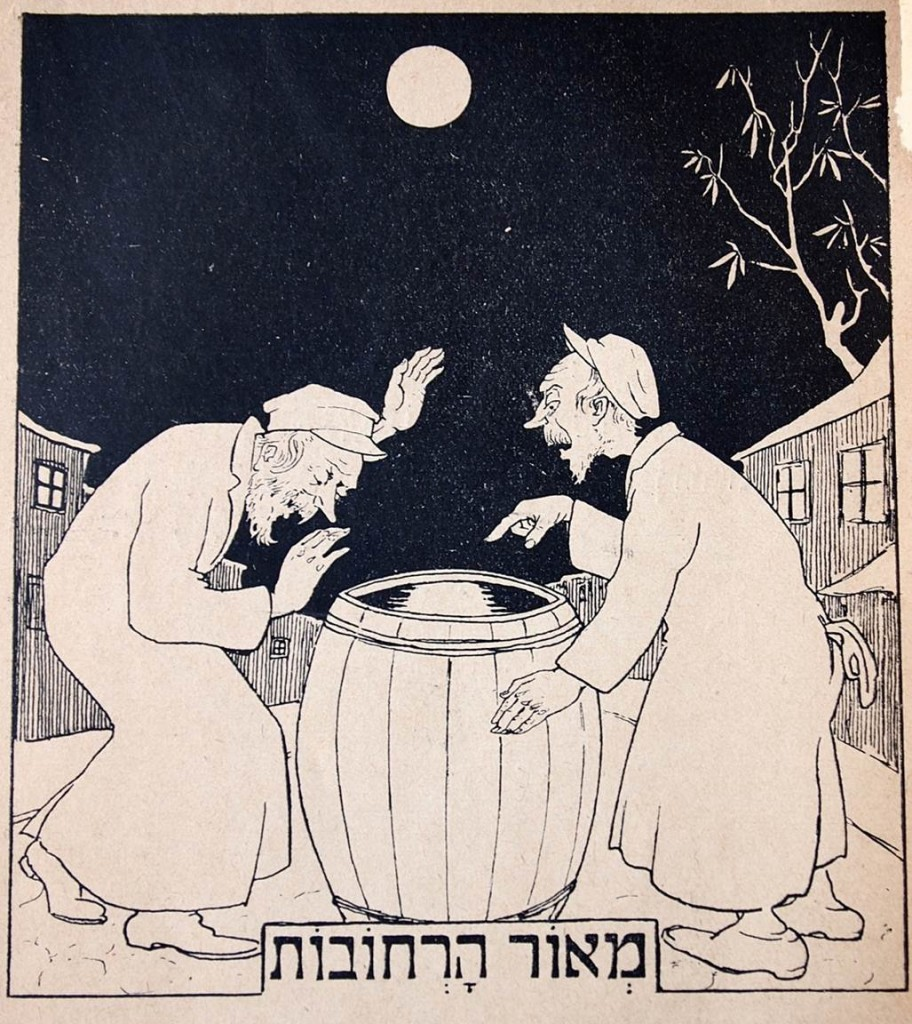
Capturing the Moon (Shaye Faygenboym, c. 1926)

Many Jewish folktales are told about Kiddush levana. In the most popular of all Wise Men of Chelm stories, adapted from a Schildbürger narrative about the sun, the Chelmites attempt to capture the moon in a barrel after clouds prevent them from reciting Kiddush levana for several months.

Juspa Hahn (1570–1637) writes that he heard from Hertz Levi of Frankfurt (d. before 1628), in the name of "the late Aaron of Posen" (fl. 1540-1590), that "Bandits captured one man and tied him to a horse to carry him off, but the captive saw that the moon was shining and asked the rider to stop so that he could recite Kiddush levana. The bandit did so, but as soon as the Jew began the blessing, his ties were loosed and he was able to flee unseen". Similarly, "the late Moses Meisels of Krakow" told Hayyim Buchner (1671) that "Once a certain Jew was attacked by gentiles at night, and they wanted to kill him. But he saw that the moon was shining, so he asked them to let him perform the mitzvah first. A miracle happened when he performed the custom of jumping! A wind arose from the gentiles, rendering him invisible, and he was saved". In Marcus Lehmann's 1866 retelling, the gentiles are struck by lightning and killed. In a version recorded in Afghanistan, moonbeams turn to rope and allow the Jew to escape.

Hasidic folktales describe miracles which allowed the ritual to be performed:

- When Yisrael Friedman of Ruzhin was arrested on the order of the czar, he was placed in an impregnable fortress, but when the time arrived for the monthly blessing of the new moon, he would elude his guards by simply walking past them uprightly, perform the religious duty, and return to his cell.
- Meir of Tiktin went to sanctify the New Moon on the night after Yom Kippur, but the sky was covered with clouds. Then he said, "Let's realize the power of Heaven!" A gust of strong wind came and the moon appeared.
- On the last night the moon could be sanctified, it was covered with clouds. Meir of Premishlan said, "How did the Jews recite Kiddush levana in the desert? Their camp was covered by the Clouds of Glory. Moshe Rabbeinu took a handkerchief, waved it at the position in the sky where the moon would be located, and the clouds parted." Meir then took out his own handkerchief, waved it at the clouds, and they too moved apart.
- Once Yaakov Yitzchak of Lublin wanted to recite Kiddush levana, but he was too old and weak to reach a window which looked out at the moon. Tzvi Hirsh of Zidichov performed a miracle and moved the moon to within view. Another version has Isaiah Weltfrajd do the same.
- A king had decreed that the Jews were to stop saying "Long live David, King of Israel" during Kiddush levana. He dreamed he was chasing a deer, which lured him far into the forest. Exhausted, he reached a hut in which a group of Jews was dining. He was very hungry, but was given a piece of bread only after he had cancelled in writing the decree against the blessing of the new moon. On awakening, he heard the Jews singing "Long live David, King of Israel". Angrily rushing outside, he was greeted by the rabbi who showed him the cancellation of the decree in his own handwriting. The king also found a piece of bread in his pocket. (Mot. F 1068) A more complicated version is told of Menahem Recanati.

Another story tells of Hayyim Pinto the Younger (1865–1938) predicting the moon landing during a Kiddush levana in 1924, saying "I promise you that some of you will live to see the day when man will go up to the moon and dance there". Hayyim Pinto III supposedly predicted Yitzhak Rabin's assassination during Kiddush levana in 1995. Hermann Schapira writes sarcastically, "The Hasidic rabbi cannot recite 'Just as a jump but do not reach you . . .' with his followers, for should he desire to touch the moon, he would of course be able to". Israel Osman, Sini Licht, and Stanley J. Schachter also mocked Hasidic folklore around Kiddush levana.

Another modern legend says that Nachmanides emigrated to the Land of Israel in order to recite Kiddush levana in Jerusalem.

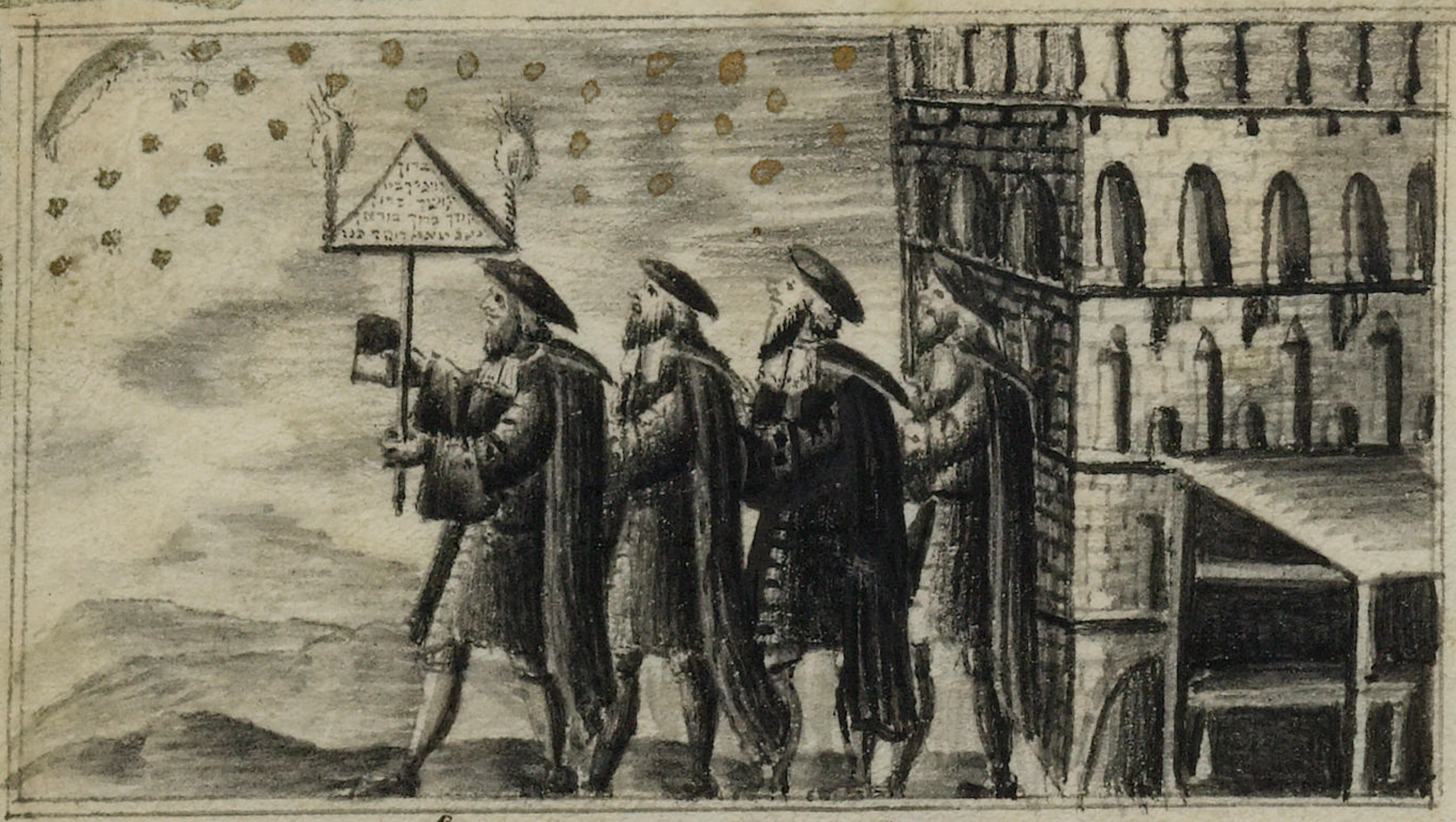
The shamash holds a Kiddush levana text with attached candles (1744).

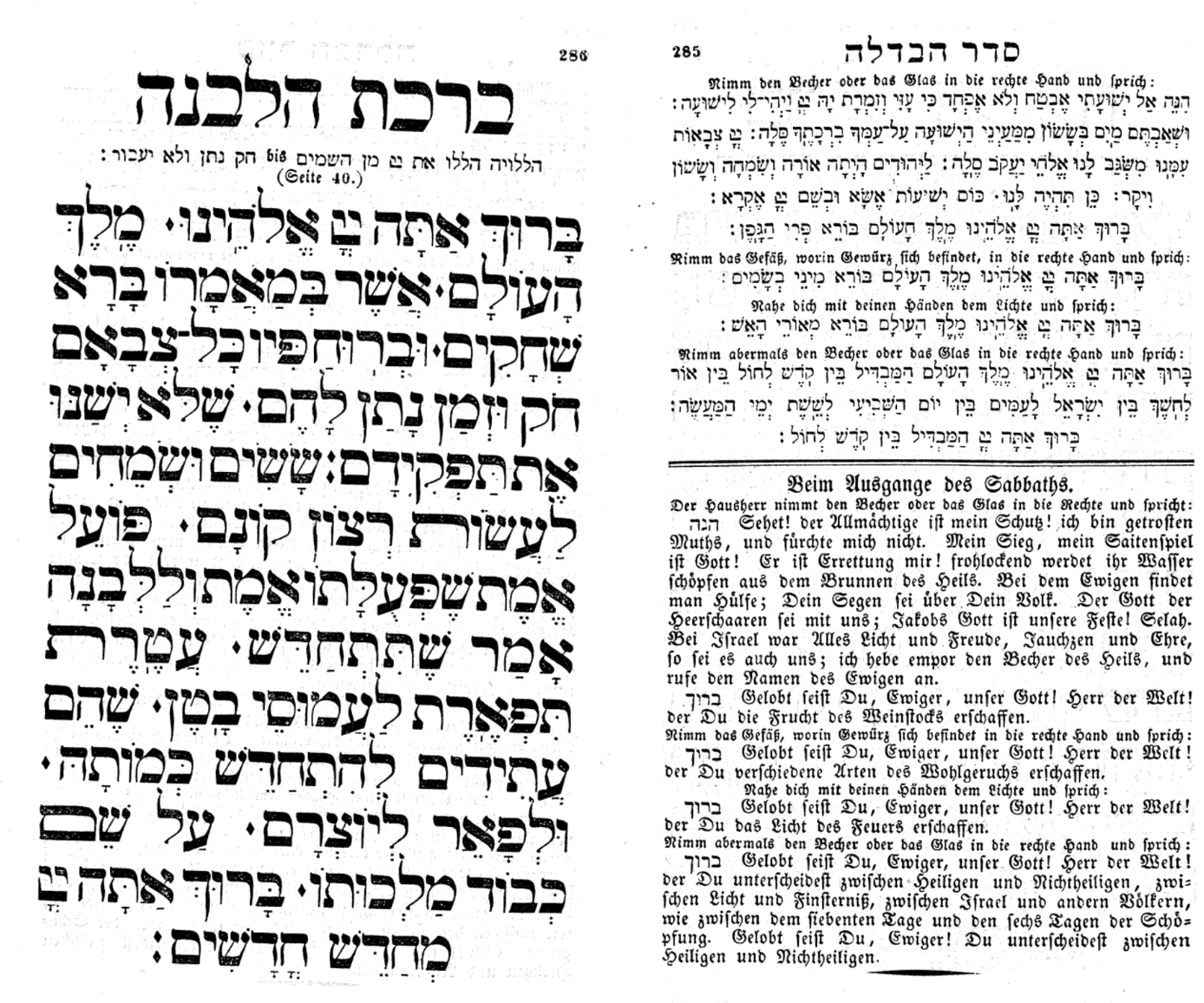
A prayerbook with extraordinarily large print for Kiddush levana (Hanover, 1863)

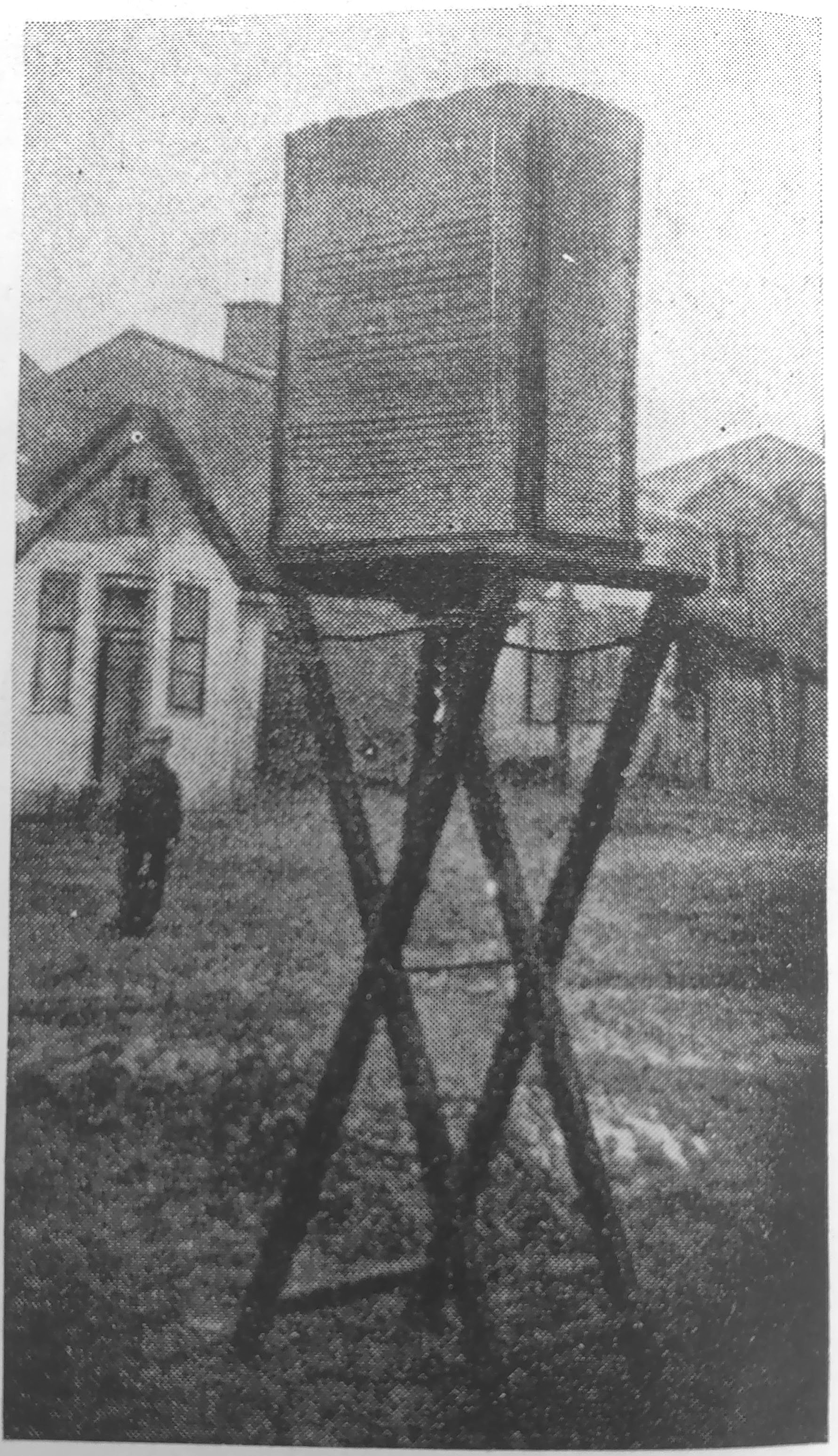
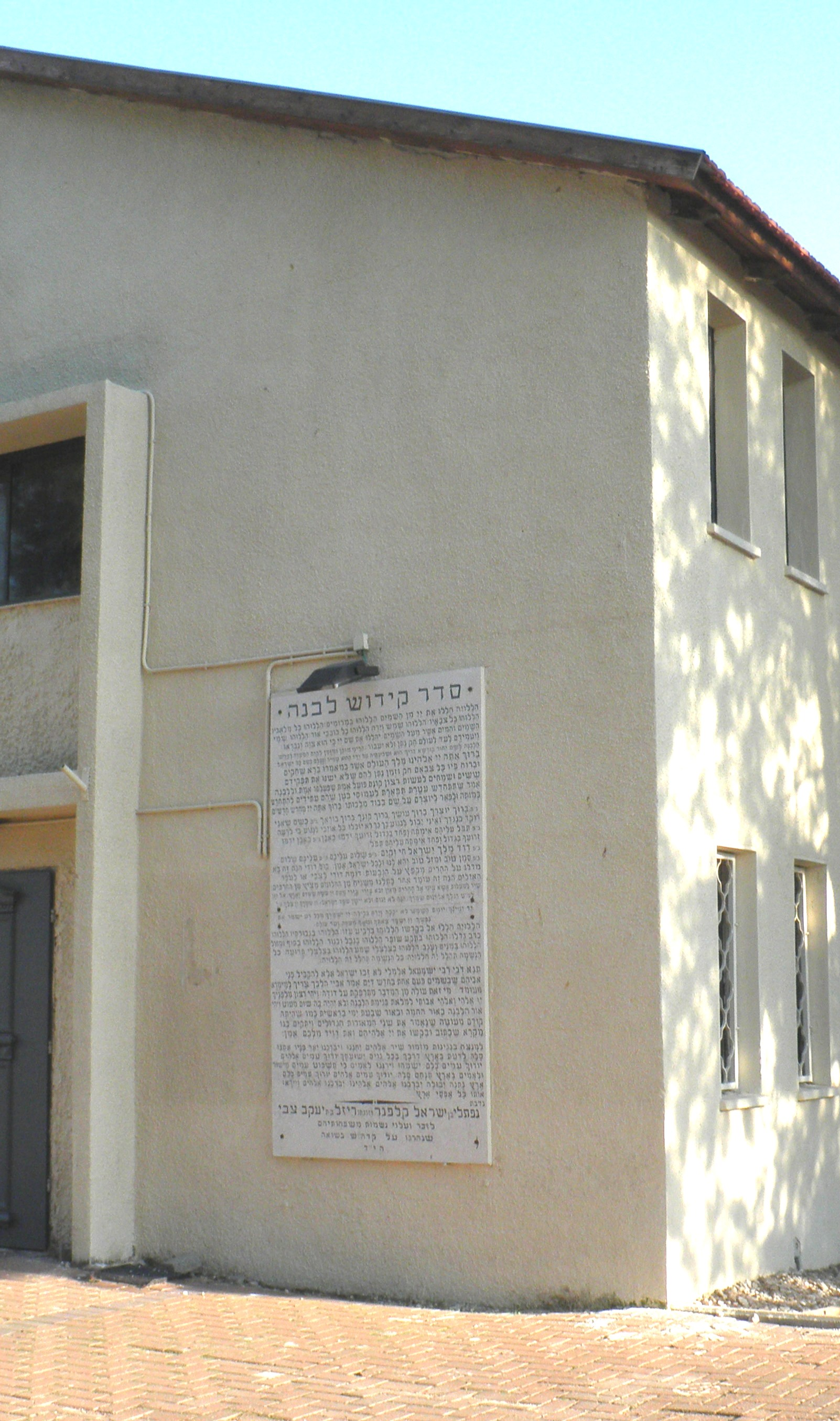
LEFT: The etched-glass Kiddush levana lantern of Kamianka (pre-Holocaust). RIGHT: A modern Kiddush levana plaque in Tzafria (2011).

=== Kiddush levana letters ===
Kiddush levana is traditionally recited outside (see above), often with only the moon for light. Prayerbooks often set Kiddush levana in large type, in order to make it easier to read. Historically, it was traditional in many places for Kiddush levana to be recited from memory, (Note: Today, some say that it is prohibited to recite Kiddush levana from memory. Tenenbaum, Jacob (1995). Kiddush levana: Otzar halakhot uminhagim. pp. 109–111.) or for one to recite it loudly on behalf of all. In others, it was recited with the aid of handheld candles, although the wind would blow these out, or the shamash would hold up a large board with the text of the liturgy. (Note: In the comedy Reb Jone: Lustspiel in fünf Aufzügen (1864) by P. Schwarz, the shamash has a special lantern for Kiddush levana, decorated with a magen david, and a "hexagonal Kiddush levana cap with silver tassels". Michael Klapp's "Eisik Adler" (1854) mentions the role of "Khideschlewanaschreier" in Frankfurt am Main, apparently of exceptionally low social status. In "Er und Sie ober Ein zehnjähriger Brautstand" (1859) he mentions a "Kidesch-Lewana-Kufer".)

S. Y. Agnon describes (1935),

Of course, there were adults in Szybusz who were pro-Zionist themselves, attended every Zionist function, and held receptions, complete with coffee and cake, for visiting Zionist speakers, whom they then took to see the local sights, such as the Great Synagogue with its sun, moon, and twelve signs of the zodiac painted on its ceiling, and its copper lantern, etched in whose glass panels was the blessing for the New Moon . . .

A similar object sat on a special stand outside the synagogue of Kamianka (image right). In Brody, 1844,

A tall structure in the form of a typical synagogue lectern was placed in the middle of the street, with parchment tablets attached to it, on which the entire ritual of the Kiddush levana could be read in large Hebrew square letters. The tablets were illuminated by several lanterns, so that one could read the content from a considerable distance.

When the first gas lamp was installed in Skala, it was used for Kiddush levana. Later, synagogues began to post the text of the prayer in large type on an outside wall. (Note: Wall-plaques were already seen as typical in 1911 Budapest; see Kohlbach, Bertalan (1911). "Zsidó múzeum". Évkönyve Kiadja Az Izraelita Magyar Irodalmi Társulat (in Hungarian). p. 55. Retrieved May 12, 2025 – via Centre for Social Sciences - Institute for Minority Studies.) In 1972, Jerusalem had "fewer than a dozen of these signs . . . measuring approximately three by four-and-a-half metres, all of the black-on-white Kiddush Levana signs throughout the world appear almost identical, as if executed by the same hand. They are mounted on any exterior wall near the synagogue entrance, and have a sheet metal 'roof' overhead, for protection against the rain. Some source of illumination is aimed at the board, to make it readable". According to Noa Ginzburg, "The style of the letters is anything but soft; it is like [the men] just want to claim her as their own". Most of the signs include the name of their donor.

Recalling the large-print prayerbooks and signs, the term "Kiddush levana letters" (Hebrew: אותיות קידוש לבנה, romanized: otiot kiddush levana) developed to refer to any text written in unusually large letters. By the First Aliyah, even secular Jews understood the term.

Other synagogues distribute laminated cards with the liturgy. Oversized printing of Kiddush levana has become less common since the advent of electric lighting. In 1997, the Teva Learning Center held Kiddush levana "lit by wildcrafted birch torches".

Some relate the term "Kiddush levana letters" to Talmudic "libona'ah script" (Jewish Babylonian Aramaic: כתב ליבונאה, romanized: ketab libona'ah), which Rashi interpreted as "large letters like those used in amulets".

== Comparative religion ==
Analogues to Kiddush levana have been found in many other cultures, going back to ancient times. The Lemba shave early for the new moon, which Deborah Grenn-Scott compares to Kiddush levana; Magdel le Roux also connects Lemba practice to Kiddush levana. Geoffrey Stern compares the shalom aleikhem element to the Salah in Islam, and Heinrich Speyer compares the blessing to Quran 25:62. Angelika Neuwirth suggests that Kiddush levana influenced the author of the Throne Verse.

"On a night when the new moon is visible, when she dangles like a golden earring from the dusky face of the Krishna-blue sky—now and then veiled by the chiffon-softness of floating clouds—a group of elongated shadowy silhouettes are seen dancing as they chant . . . Suddenly a strong gust of wind blows upon their kaftans and they become winged Chagall-like creatures soaring heavenwards on shimmering rays of blue mingling with silver".

— Hadassah (March 1963). "Dance Themes of Hassidism and Hinduism". Dance Observer. Vol. 30. p. 37.

Susan Gillingham compares Kiddush levana to the Christmas liturgy in Roman Catholicism, and Hadassah likens Hasidic dancing during Kiddush levana to Hindu mudras. Israel Zolli compares the shalom aleikhem to Essene practices described by Josephus.

According to Regina Lilientalowa, "The Jew joyfully jumps three times [during Kiddush levana], a practice mirrored by the Fetu tribespeople near the Gulf of Guinea". Géza Róheim compares Kiddush levana to several different African practices, classifying it generally as "Hamitic". Émile Petitot compared Kiddush levana to a Dene lunar ritual.

Morris Jastrow Jr. and Kaufmann Kohler compare Kiddush levana to the practices of Arabian tribes. Charles Montagu Doughty describes, "The new moon was welcomed by the men with devout exclamations, and by these poor nomad women with carols in the first hours of the night . . . The hareem chanted their perpetual refrain of a single verse, and danced for an hour or two . . . The first appearing of the virgin moon is always greeted with a religious emotion in the deserts of Arabia". The Jebeliya still follow this custom, and among the Ruwallah, "If they sight the new moon they show him to each other and raise their hands to him, crying: "O thou new moon O lord! O our benefactor! O powerful new moon O thou, who savedst us (from an attack) this (month) just passed, wilt surely save us also in that which is now beginning". Another liturgy was recorded in Morocco.

Many scholars compare Kiddush levana to Zoroastrian rituals. The Zoroastrian liturgy is "Hail to Ahura Mazda! . . . We sacrifice to the new moon, the holy and master of holiness", and their New Moon lasted for the first five days of the month. In 1879, Andrew Carnegie described, "This evening we were surprised to see, as we strolled along the beach [in Mumbai], more Parsees than ever before, and more Parsee ladies richly dressed; all seemed wending their way to the sea. It was the first of the new moon, a period sacred to these worshippers of the elements; and here on the shores of the ocean, as the sun was sinking in the sea, and the slender silver thread of the crescent moon was faintly shining in the horizon, they congregated to perform their religious rites". Similar customs existed in Delhi.

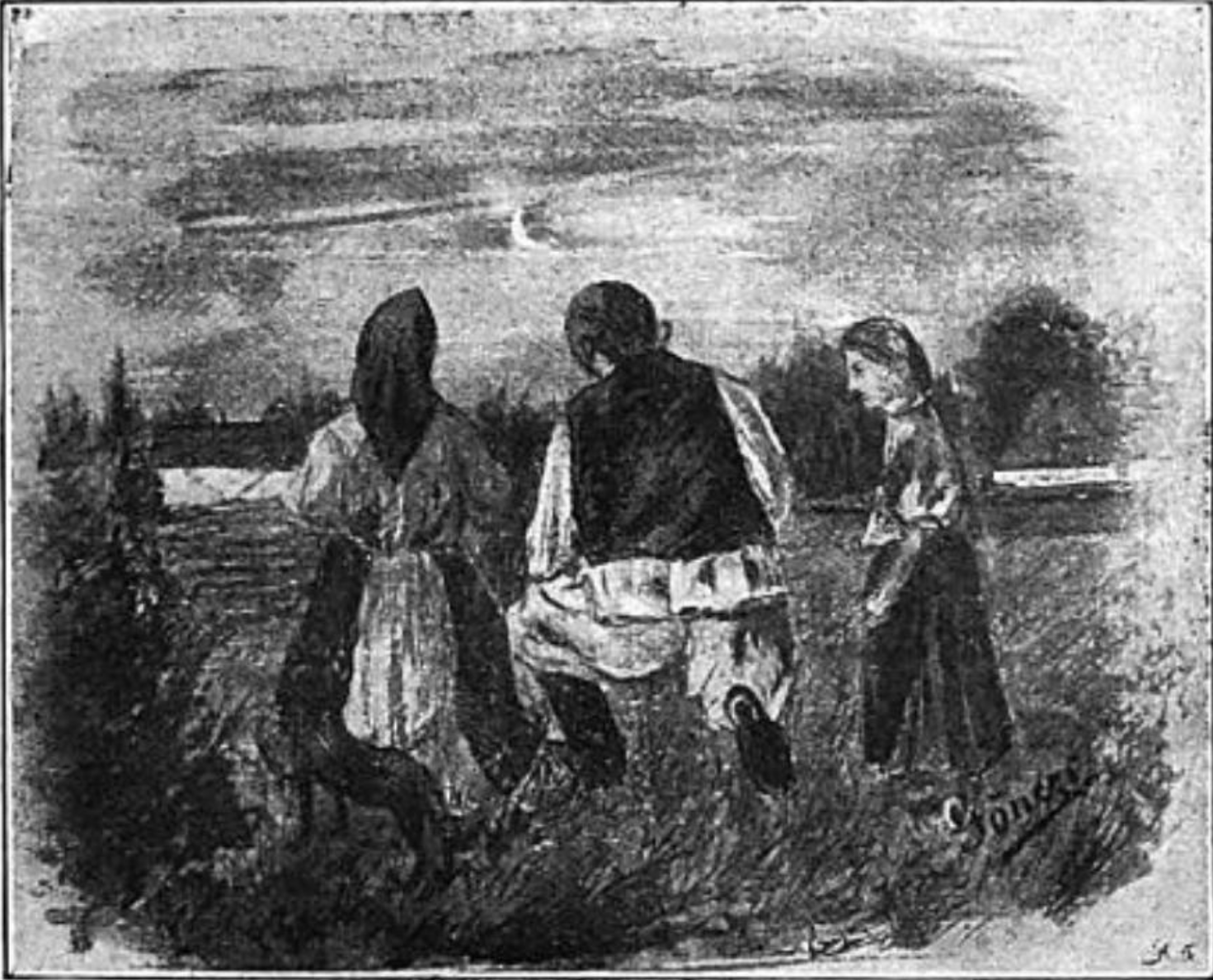
Prayer at the New Moon (c. 1895) shows a European folk custom.

Hans H. Spoer argues that Germanic tribes had a similar ritual: "Tacitus tells us that the ancient Germans met on new and full moon. They even worshiped the moon as late as the early Christian centuries, so that Hrabanus Maurus, who died 858, charged the Hessians that they still saluted their "Her Mon," and that they with noise and shouting came to the assistance of the oppressed moon (by eclipses)". Joshua Trachtenberg compares Kiddush levana to a custom recorded in the 19th century in the Ore Mountains, where "Bowing three times to the full moon is said to bring gifts", and earlier by Nicholas Magni (1355–1435), who complains "that many people both laity and clergy, even including masters, bend the knee or bow the head at new moon". Other German folk customs compared to Kiddush levana include liturgies to the moon for curing ailments and greetings. In Armenia, "'My mother, an octogenarian, has the habit of standing and praying when the new moon appears, moving from right to left and doing little jumps.' This is exactly the Birkat halevana".

Among the precepts of the Dönmeh was (c. 1760), "Each and every month they shall look up and behold the birth of the moon and shall pray that the moon turn its face opposite the sun, face to face". Gershom Scholem explains, "This is the observance of the Sanctification of the (New) Moon . . ." One descendant recalled that "she was taken out to see the new moon each month and to recite a prayer that her mother taught her: 'O God, I see the Moon, O God I do believe. Let the Moon be blessed by God.'"

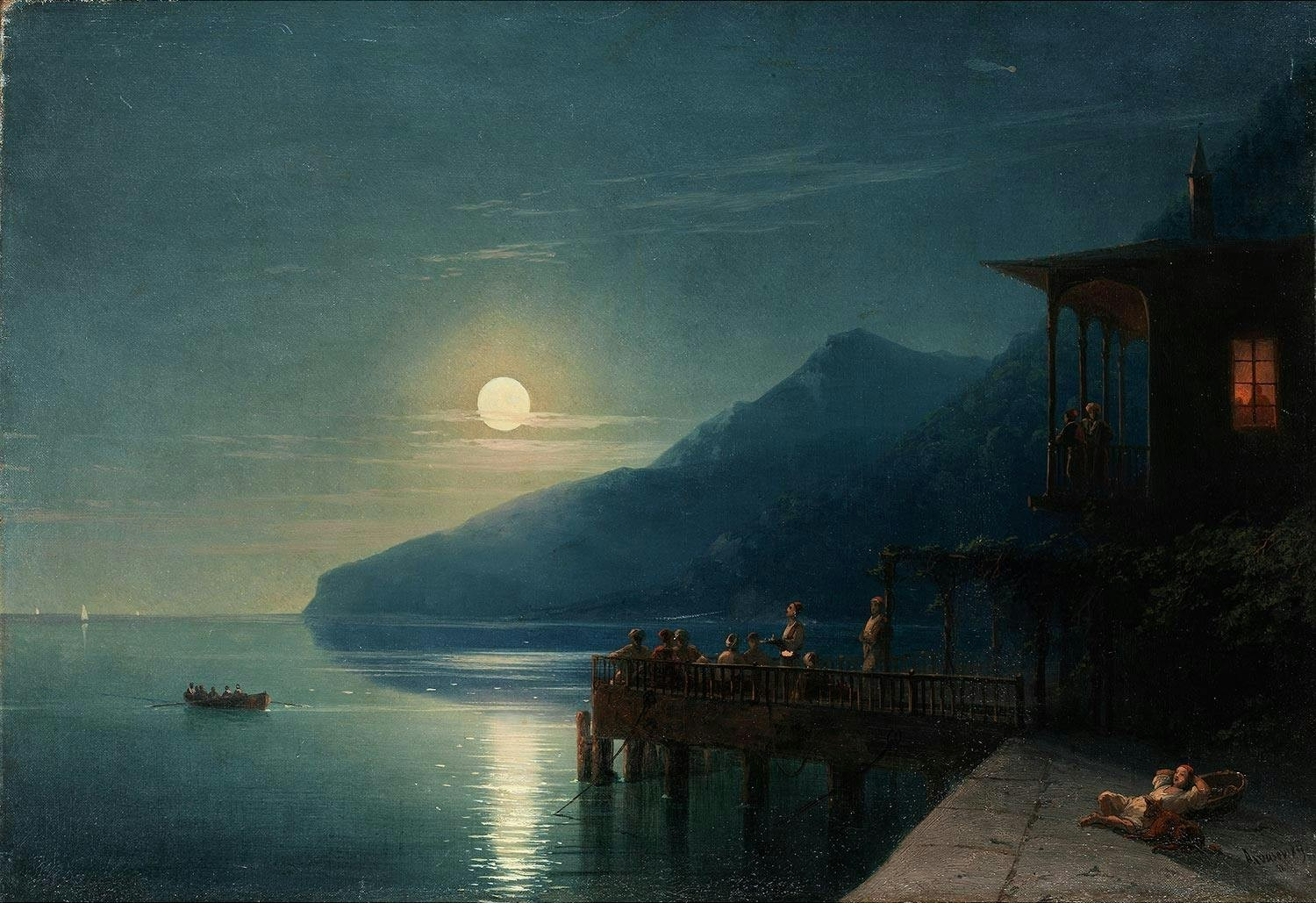
Turkish prayer for the moon, depicted by Ivan Aivazovsky in 1875.

Simon Péchi (c. 1575–1642) adapted Judah bar Ezekiel's liturgy to Hungarian verse. Other Szekler Sabbatarian hymns also paraphrased Kiddush levana, and they probably recited these while looking up at the sky.

In Ireland, "Another custom, or religious adoration, is that of praying to the new moon the first time that luminary is seen after its change. This seems to be a mixture of Jewish and Heathen worship, of which Selden de Diis Syriis speaks, as related in the additamenta M. Andr. Beyeri, page 80, where he also quotes a French author, saying of the inhabitants of Ireland, 'se mettent a genoux en voyant la lune nouvelle, et disent en parlant a la lune; laisse nous ausi sains que tu nous as trouvé.' (William Shaw Mason 1819). Charles Vallancey adds, "This custom is still preserved, and every peasant in Ireland on seeing the new Moon crosses himself and says, slan fuar tu sin agus slan adfaga tu sin, whole you find us and whole leave us. John Aubrey recorded (1696), "The Women have several Magical Secrets . . . At the first appearance of the new Moon after New-years Day, go out in the Evening, and stand over the Sparrs of a Gate, or Stile, looking on the Moon and say, All Hail to the Moon, all Hail to thee, I prithee good Moon reveal to me, This Night who my Husband (Wife) must be. You musst presently after go to Bed. I knew two Gentlewomen, that did thus when they were young Maids, and they had Dreams of those that Married them."

In Brazil, "The only prayer they agreed to share with me, and only after a great deal of begging, was the prayer for the new moon. The new moon prayer has very little to do with the traditional Jewish Kiddush Levanna except that it is done exactly at the period of the new moon and it has to be done under the open sky. Otherwise there is very little in common. The Venhaver prayer for the New Moon is a rather superstitious plea to the moon, as though it had the power of granting one's wishes. Their prayer says 'Lua nova, lua cheia, lua de quarto crescente; quando fores que vieres trazei-me este presente New moon, full moon, half moon, when you go and came back, do bring me back this gift.' The 'gift' is understood as being the fulfillment of a wish. Although these prayers do not resemble the Kiddush Levanna, it has the potential of being the vestige of the traditional Jewish practice, since such prayer is absolutely unknown among the Gentiles in the area".

In Mali, "On the first appearance of the new moon, which they look upon to be newly created, the [Mandinka], as well as Mahomedans, say a short prayer; and this seems to be the only visible adoration which the kafirs offer up to the Supreme Being. This prayer is pronounced in a whisper; the party holding up his hands before his face: its purport (as I have been assured by many different people) is to return thanks to God for his kindness through the existence of the past moon, and to solicit a continuation of his favour during that of the new one. At the conclusion, they spit upon their hands, and rub them over their faces." In Samoa, "On the appearance of the new moon all the members of the family called out: 'Child of the moon, you have come.' They assembled also, presented offerings of food, had a united feast, and joined in the prayer: 'Oh, child of the moon! Keep far away disease and death.'"

== Gallery ==
=== Manuscript illuminations (1300–1600) ===
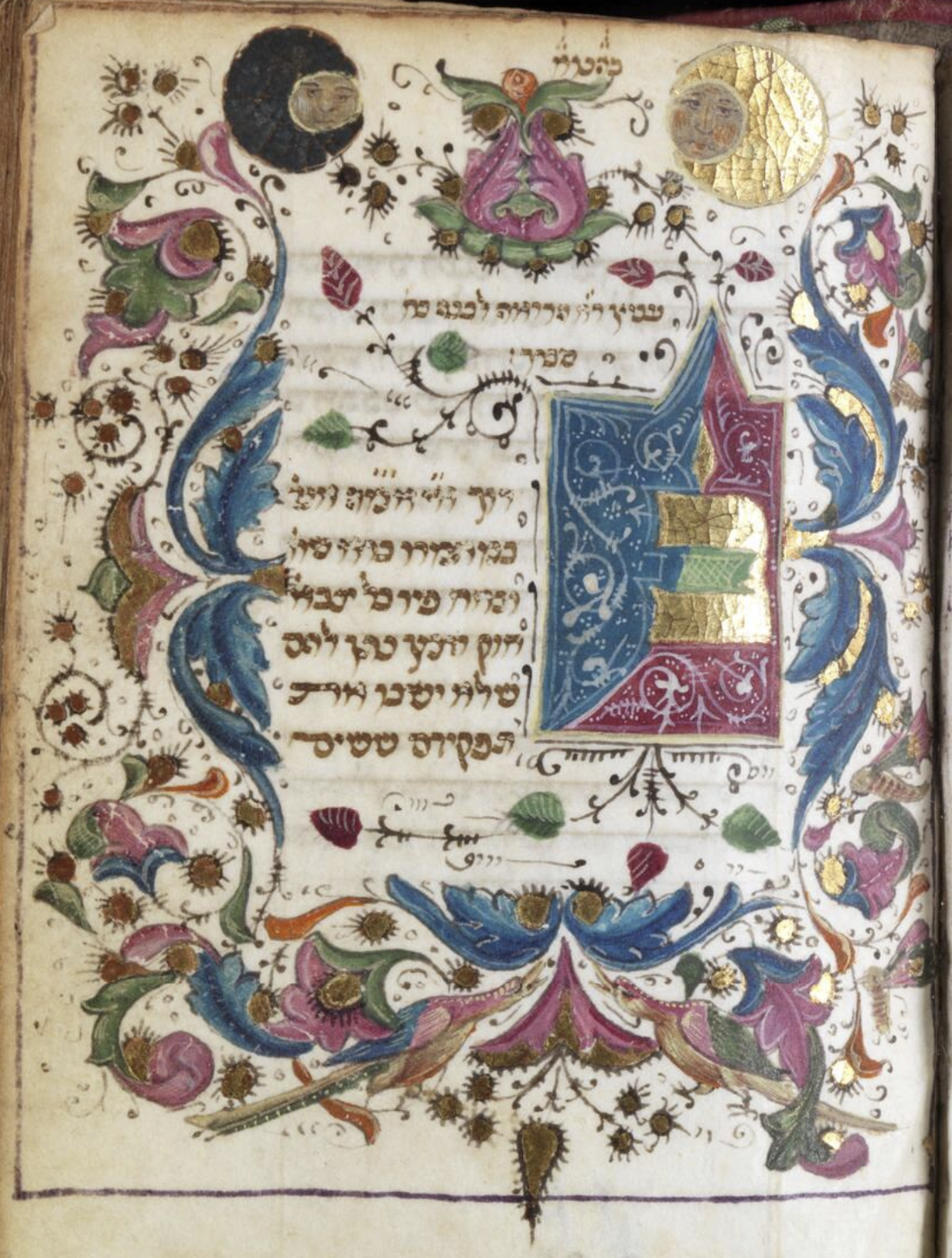
15th century (Italy), by "Isaac"

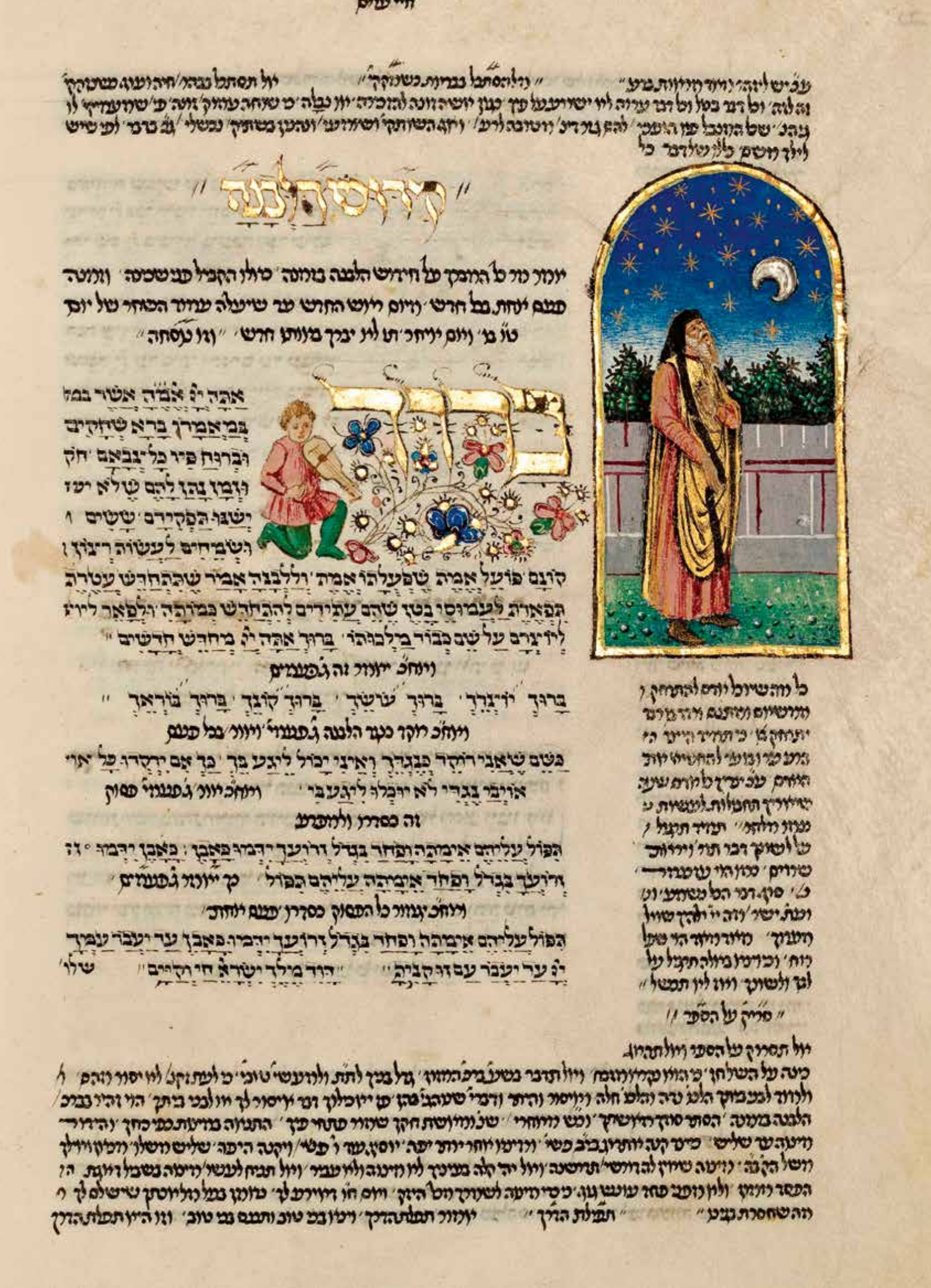
1478–1480, in the Rothschild Miscellany (Note: The Israel Museum's Wing of Jewish Life proposed sending a facsimile of this page into space with Artemis I. Nizza-Caplan, Anna (Winter 2022-2023). "Moonstruck: Curators Gazing Starward!". Israel Museum Magazine (English). pp. 71-72.)

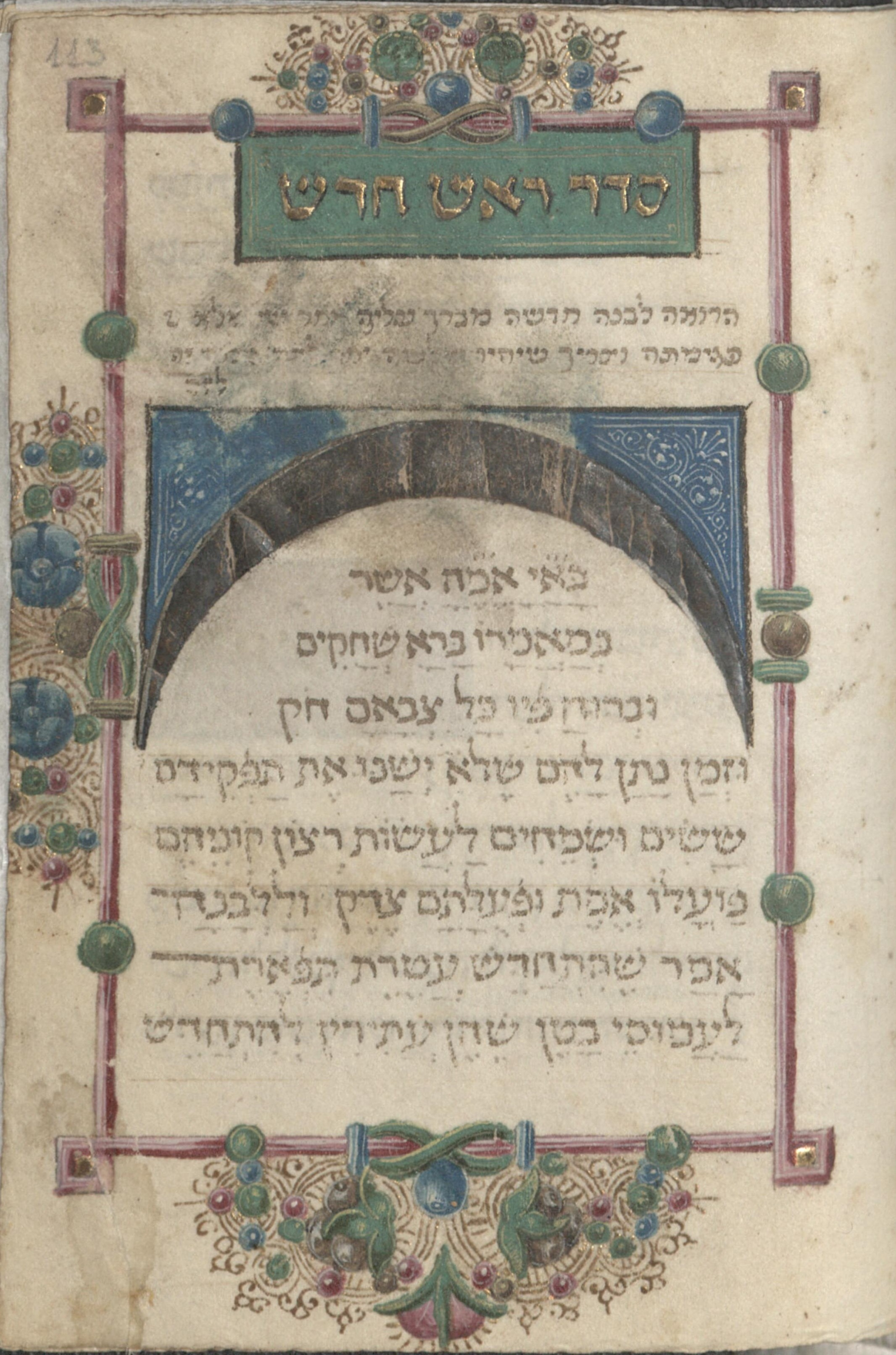
1480 (Mantua), by Abraham Farissol (Note: Farissol's 1471 copy for a woman, MS JTS 8255 f. 63v, was included above. That version contains only the Talmudic blessing, but in 1480 he supplemented it with "Blessed be your Creator . . ." and the exchange of greetings. In 1473, Farissol had copied the Alilot Devarim, which critiques "Blessed by your Creator . . ." Moritz Steinschneider proposed that Farissol was in fact the original author of the Alilot Devarim. Ibid. (March–April 1864). "Periodische Literatur". Hebraeische Bibliographie. 7 (38): 28. Retrieved July 23, 2025 - via Internet Archive. Note that Steinschneider is suspicious of the 1468 manuscript's date, but for no good reason. He has misread "Nissan" as "Sivan".)

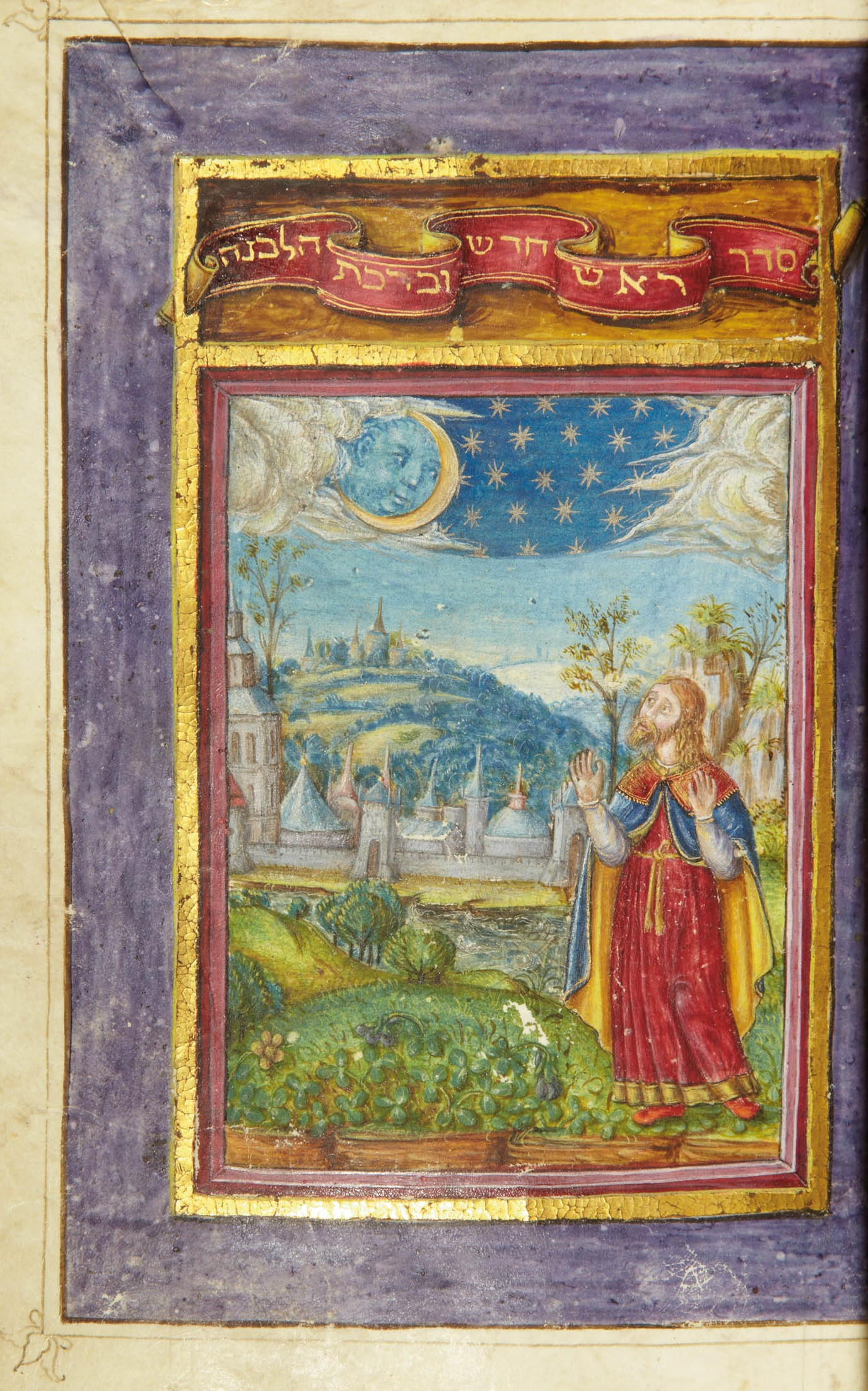
1490s (Florence), by Giovanni di Giuliano Boccardi, "one of the last representatives of the golden age of Florentine renaissance illumination"

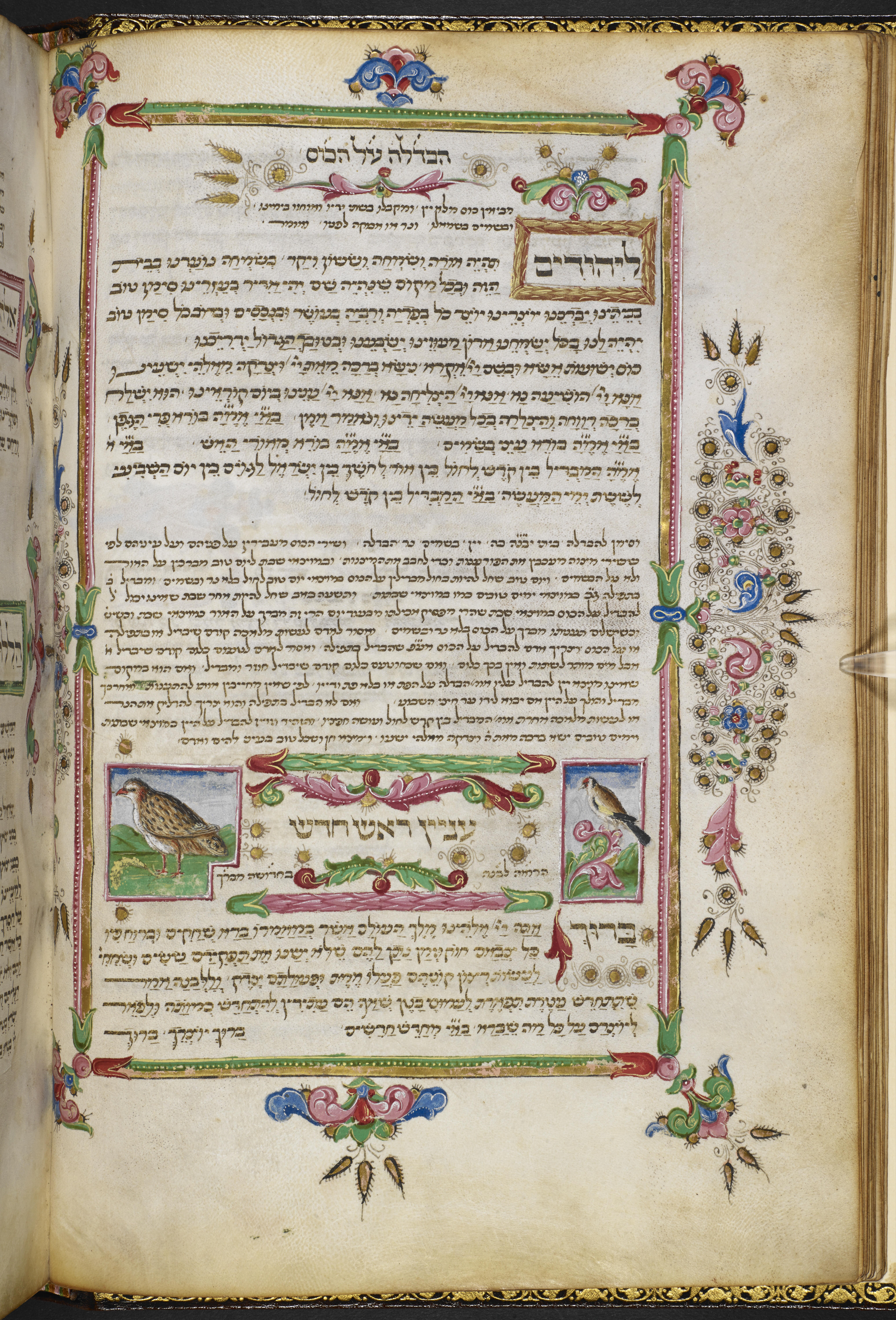
15th century (Ferrara?)

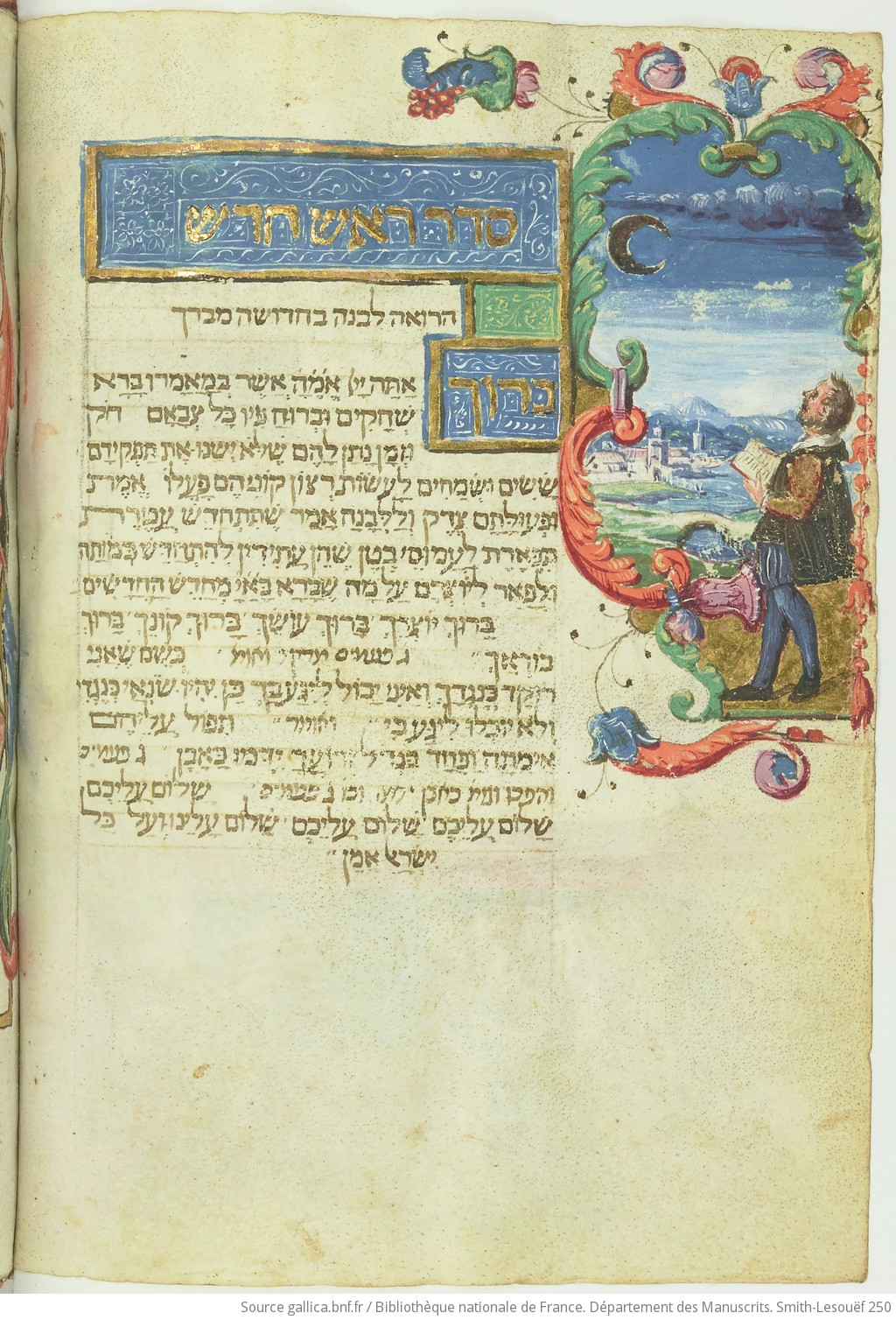
1520 (Italy), text by Moshe ben Hayyim Aqrish

=== Woodcuts (1525–1775) ===
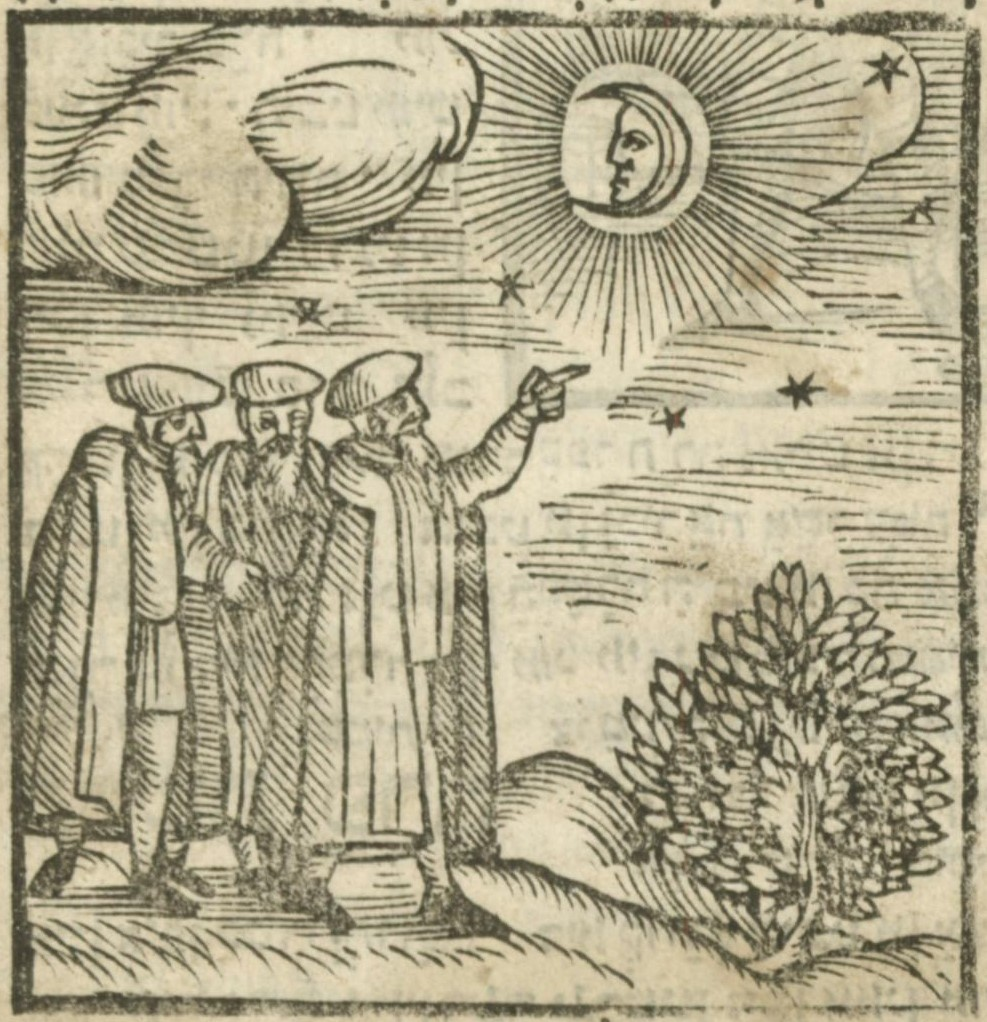
1593 (Venice)

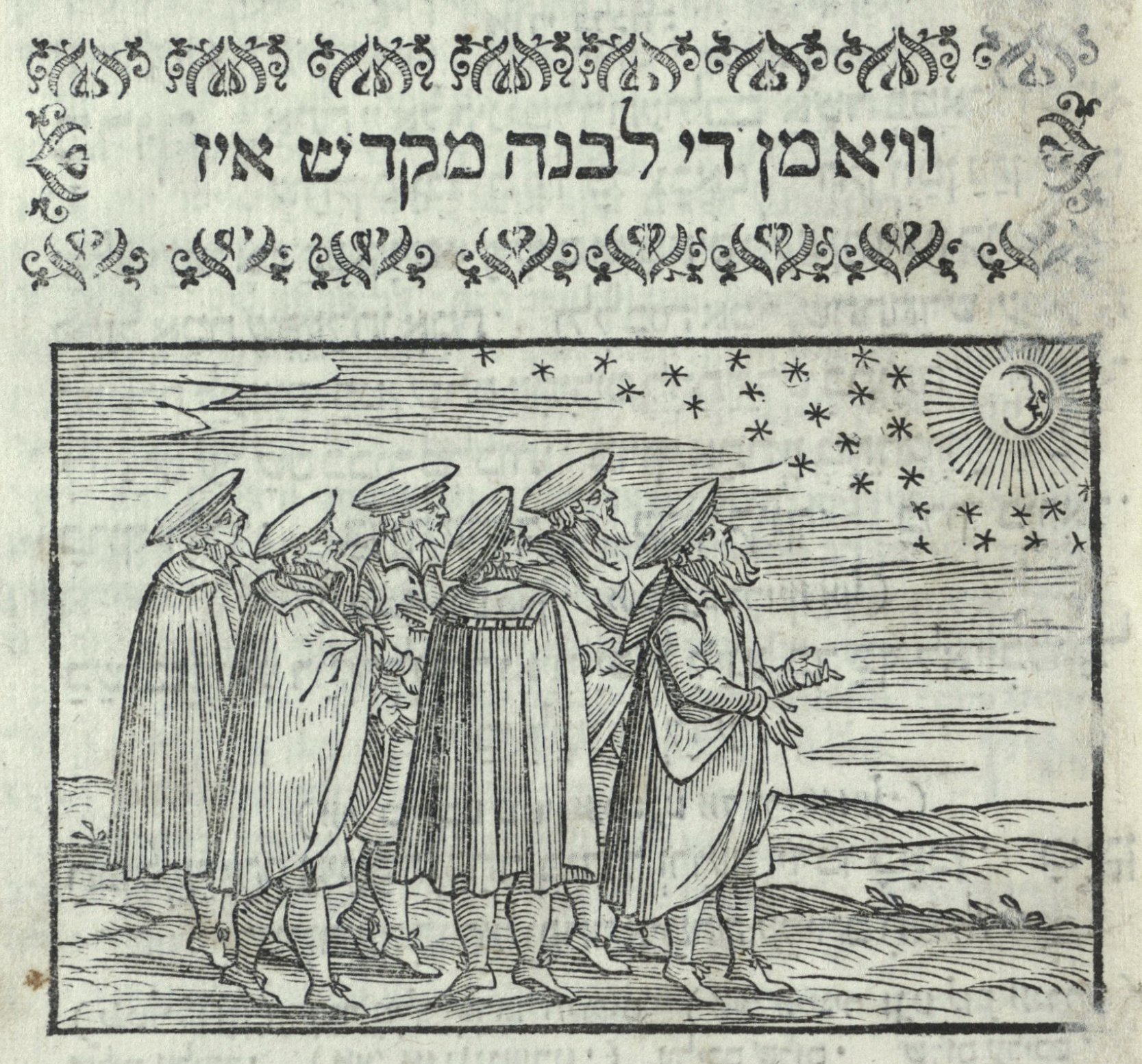
1601 (Venice)

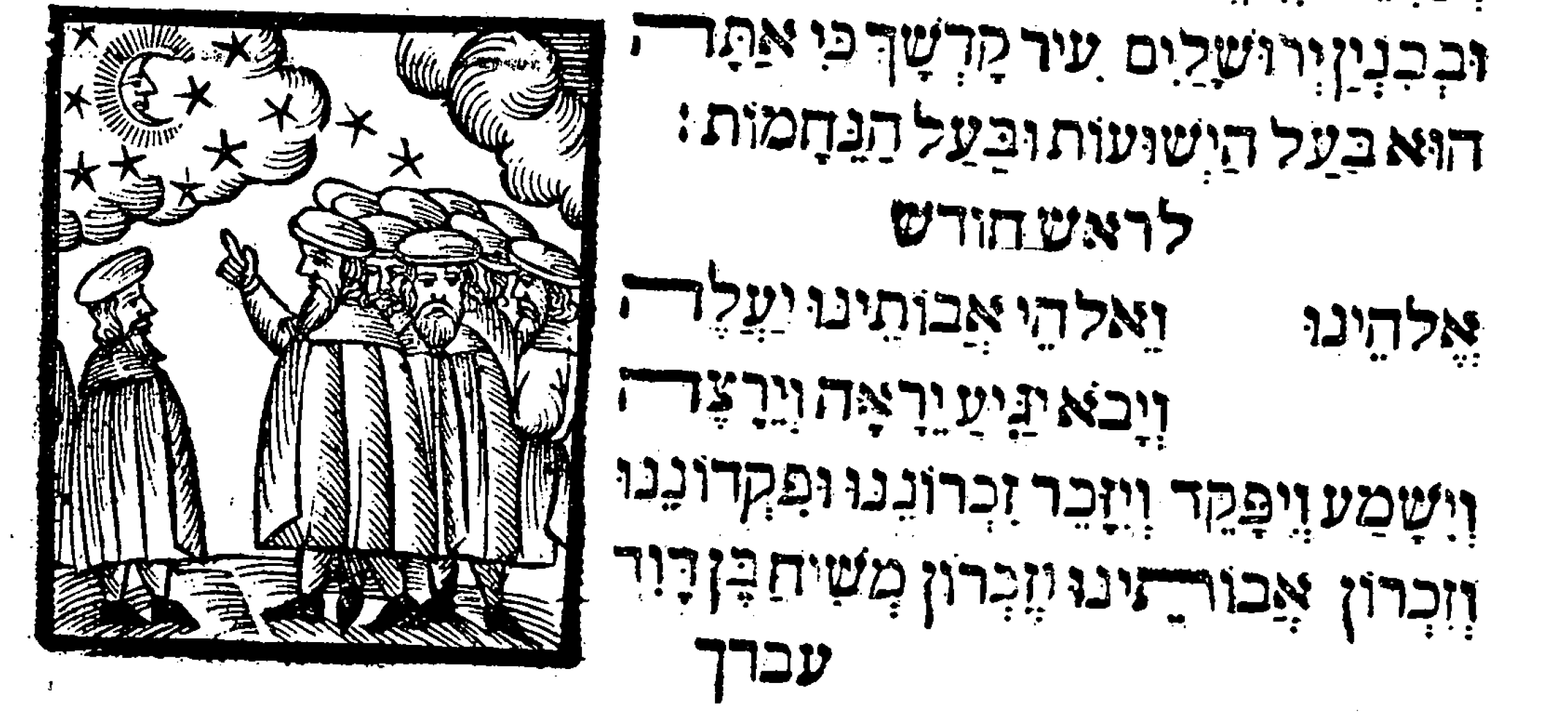
1692 (Dyhernfurth)

=== Engravings (1685–1800) ===
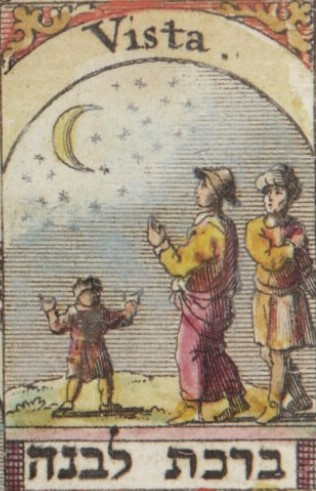
1687, by Benjamin Senior Godines, with watercolors

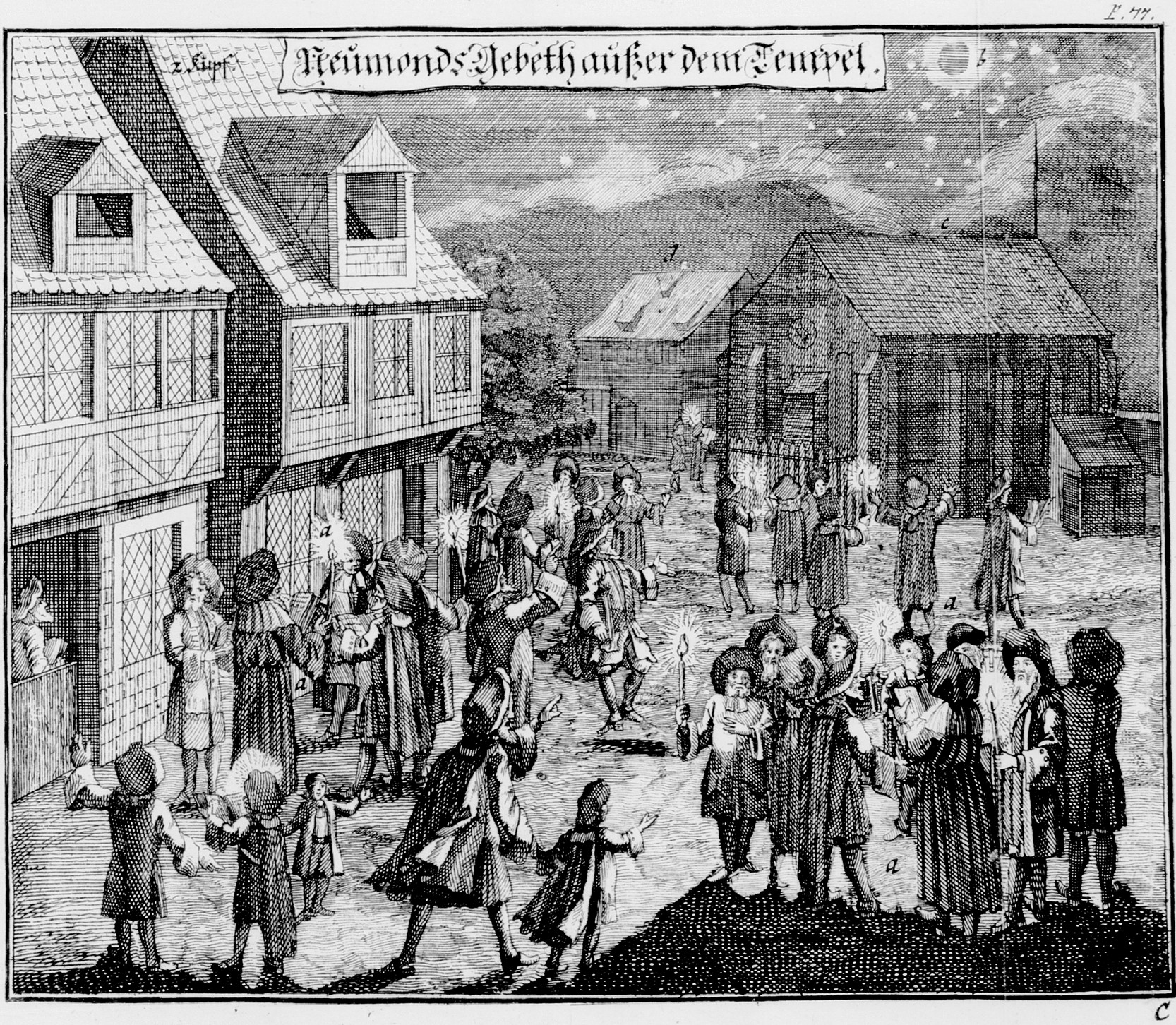
1720 (Fürth), by "C." (Note: Signed in the 1734 edition only.)

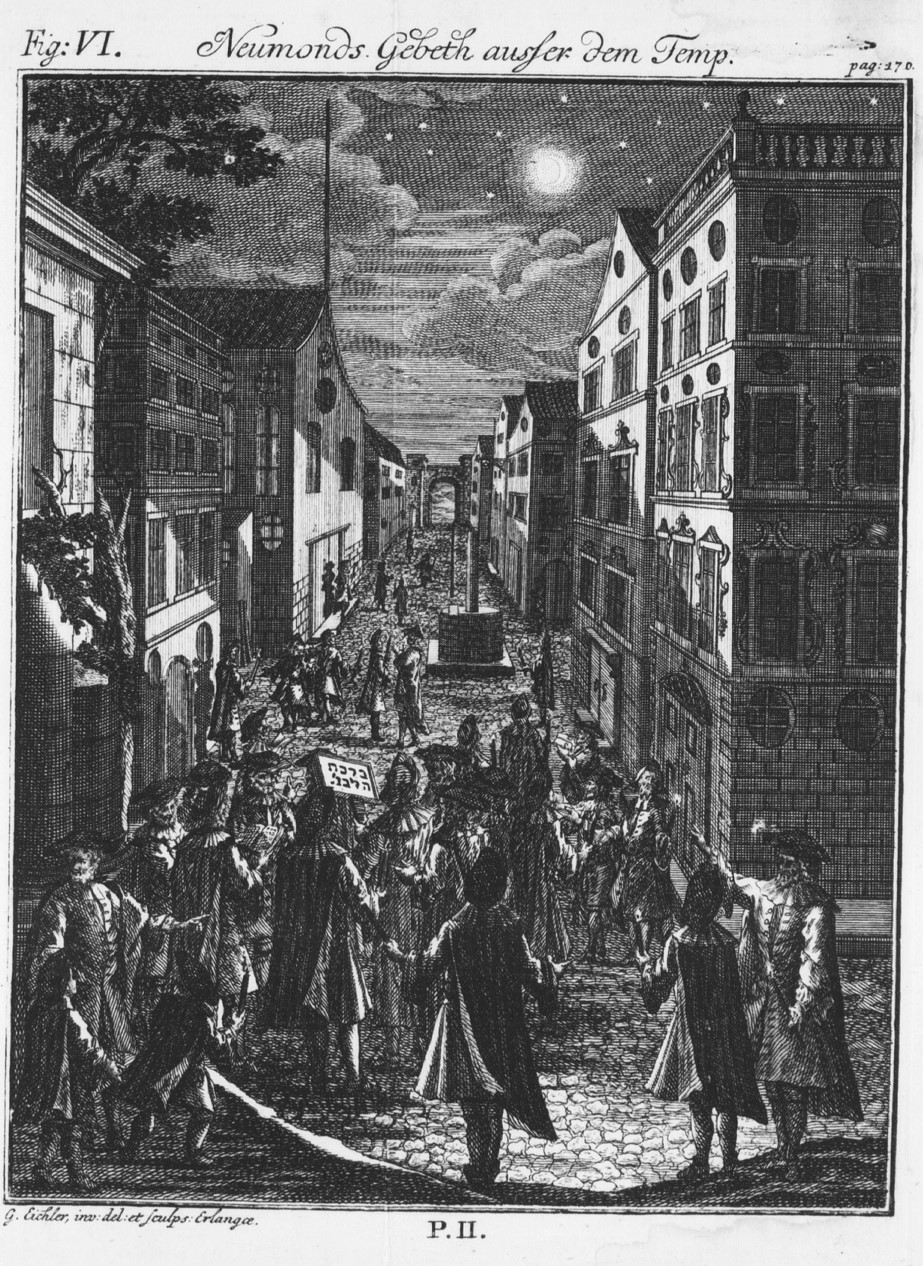
1748, by Gottfried Eichler

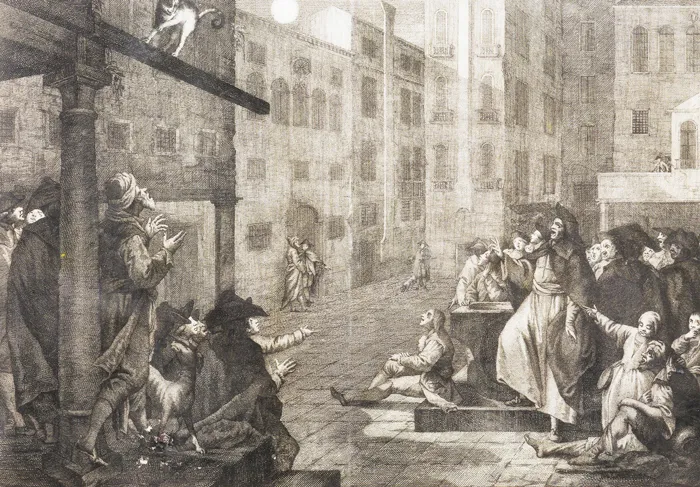
1786–1800 (Padua? Venice?), by Giovanni Maria de Pian

=== Revival illuminations (1712–1800) ===
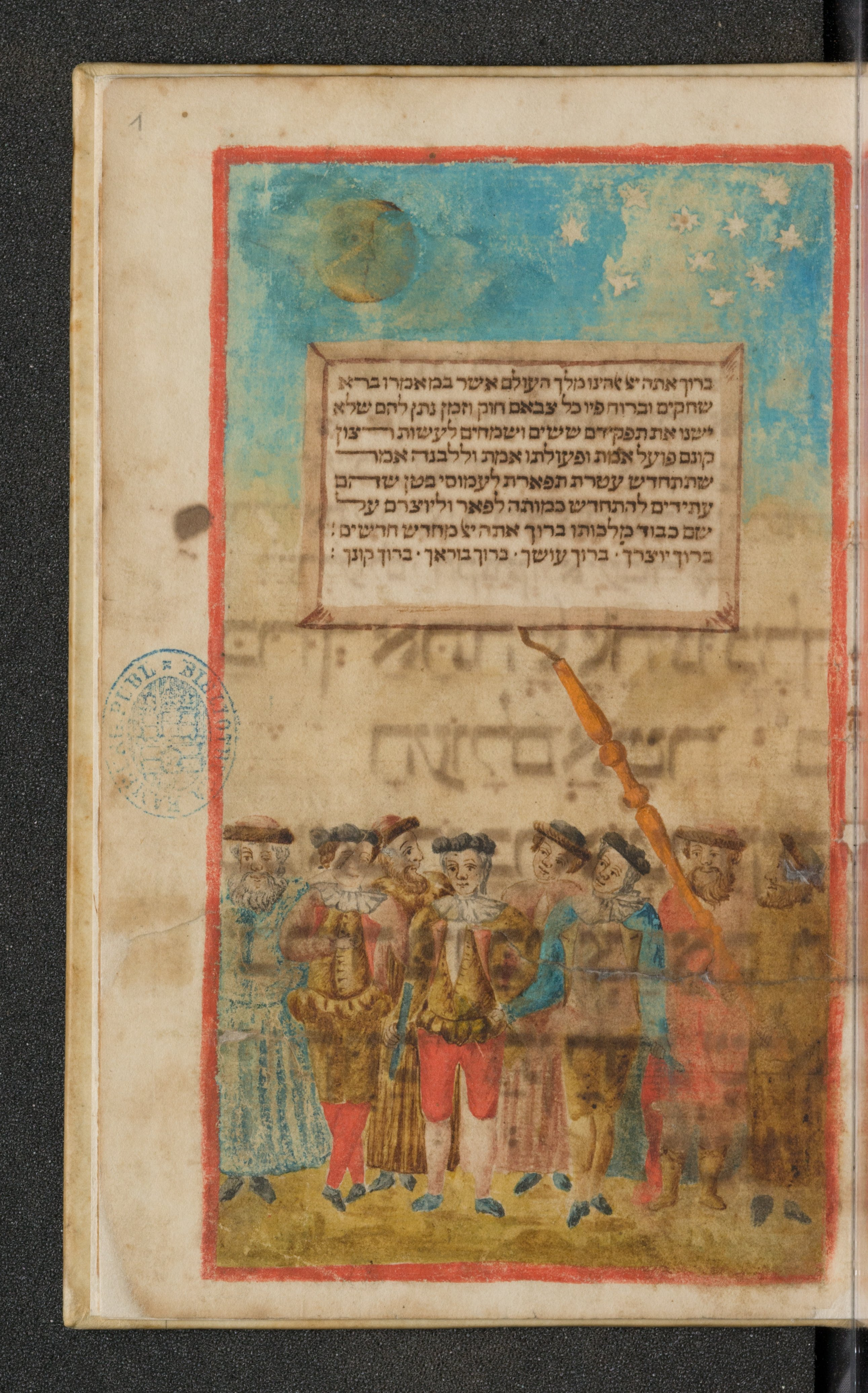
18th-century

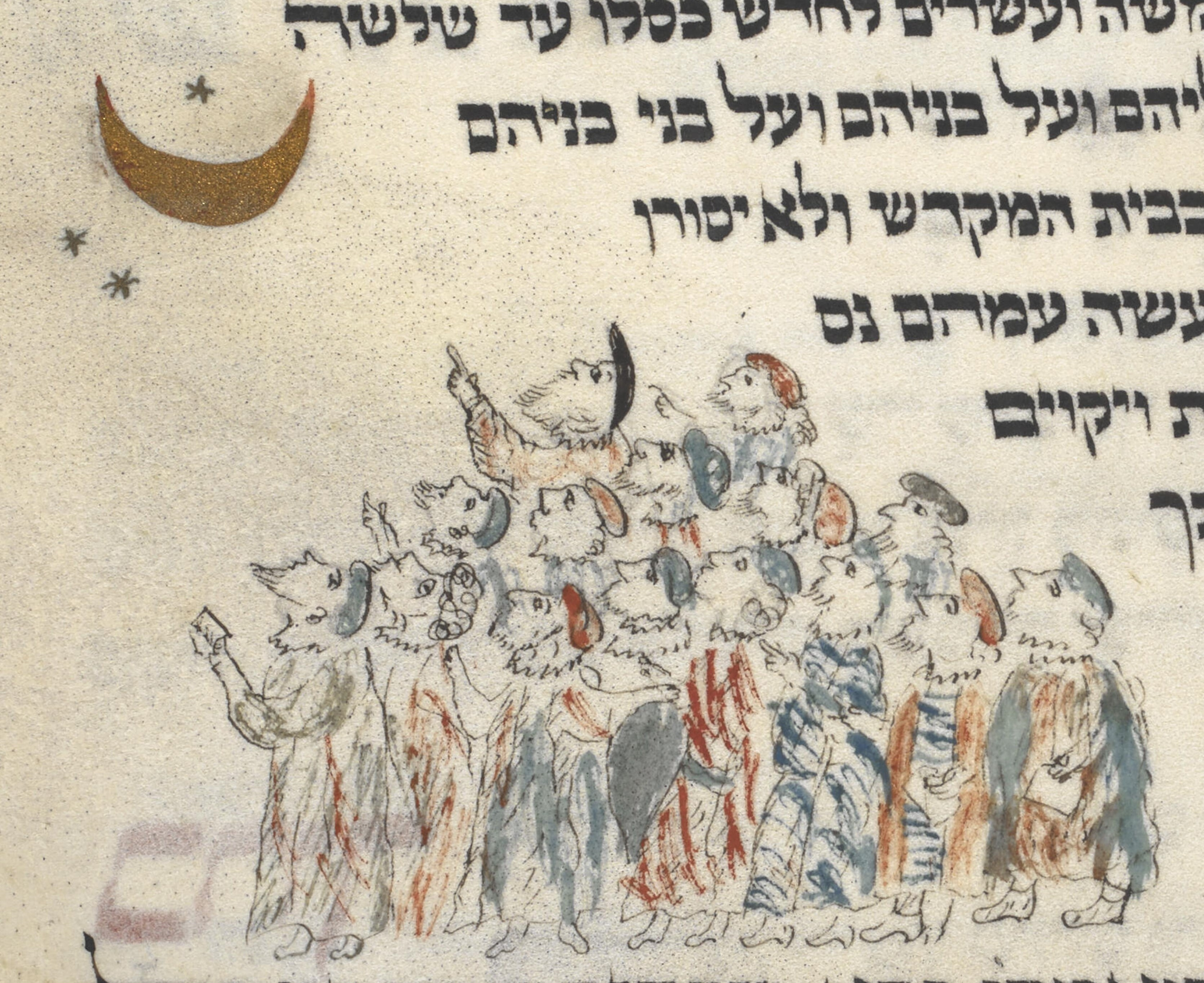
1714, by Aaron ben Moses of Novardok

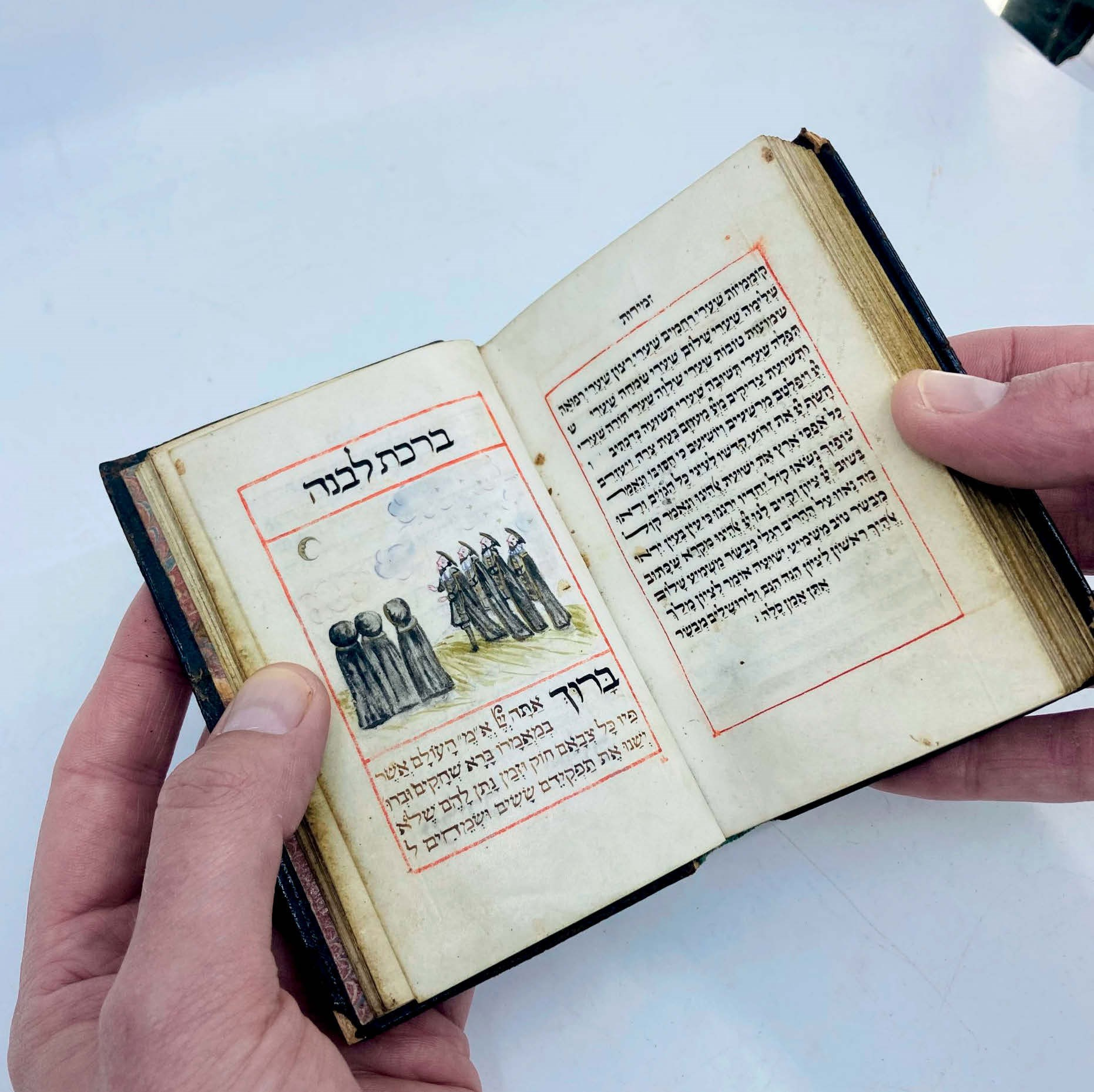
1717 (Amsterdam)

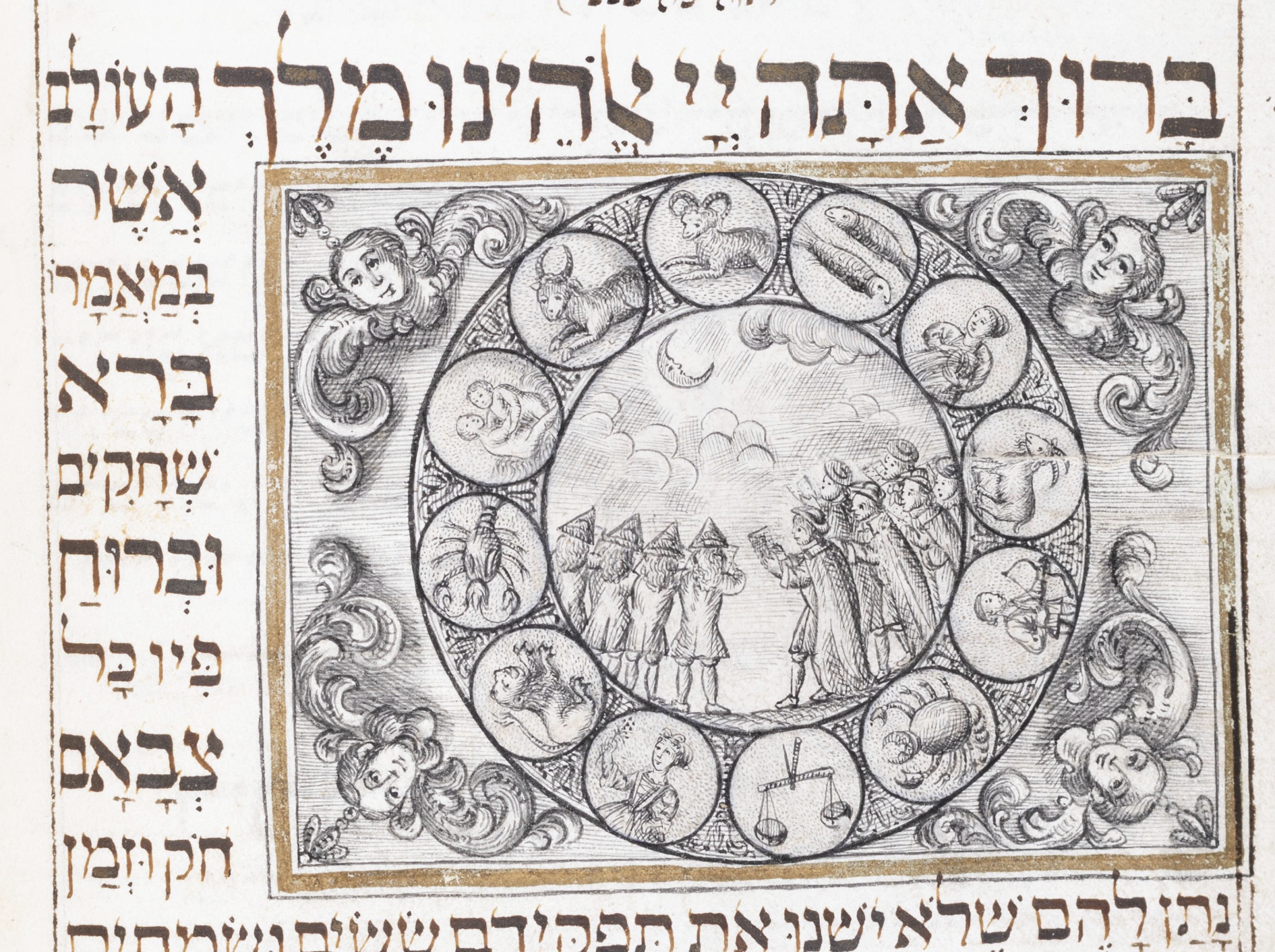
18th-century, with zodiac (Note: "By its very nature, the Blessing of the Moon was a subject that invited zodiac illustration . . . In this manuscript, a product of German-Jewish culture, the illustrator did not avoid drawing the human form, and he may have copied the zodiac signs from a printed German mahzor". Fishof, Iris (ed.) (2001). Written in the Stars. p. 72. See also broadsheet above and Hachlili, Rachel (2013). Ancient Synagogues – Archaeology and Art. Brill. pp. 382–385.)

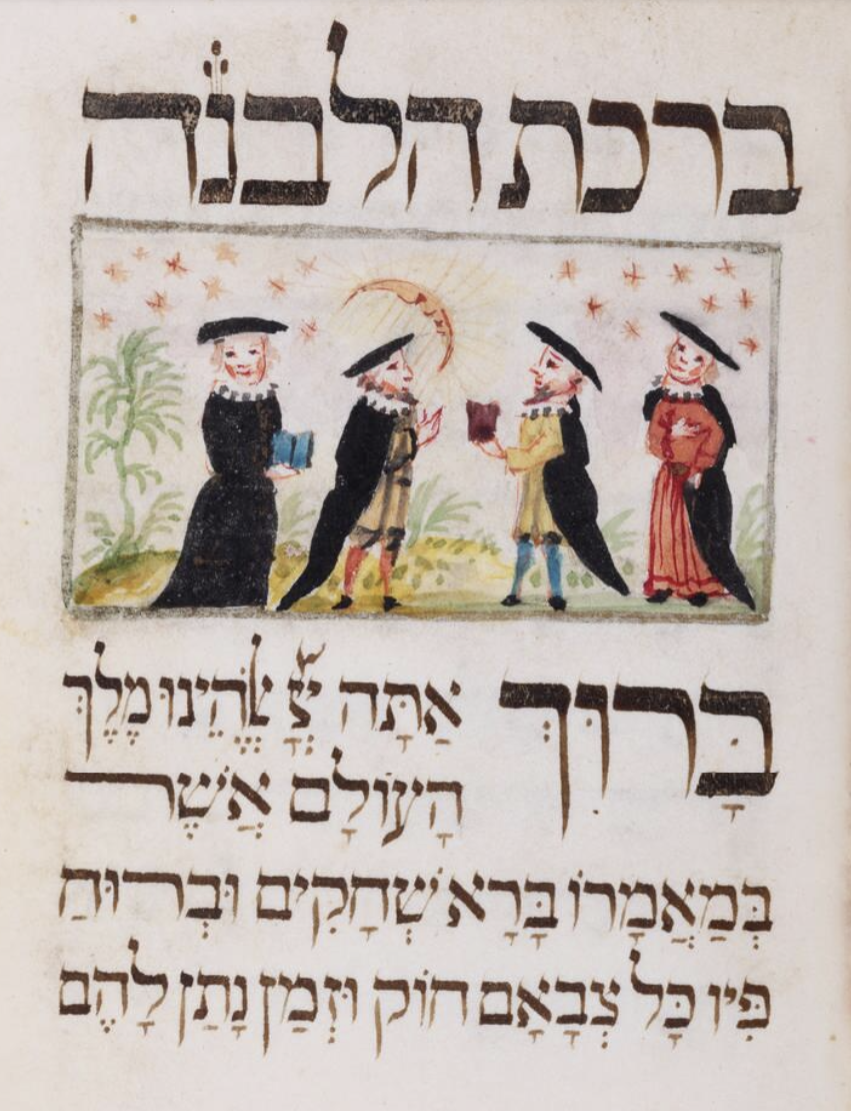
1727 (Moravia?), by Nathan ben Samson of Mezhyrich

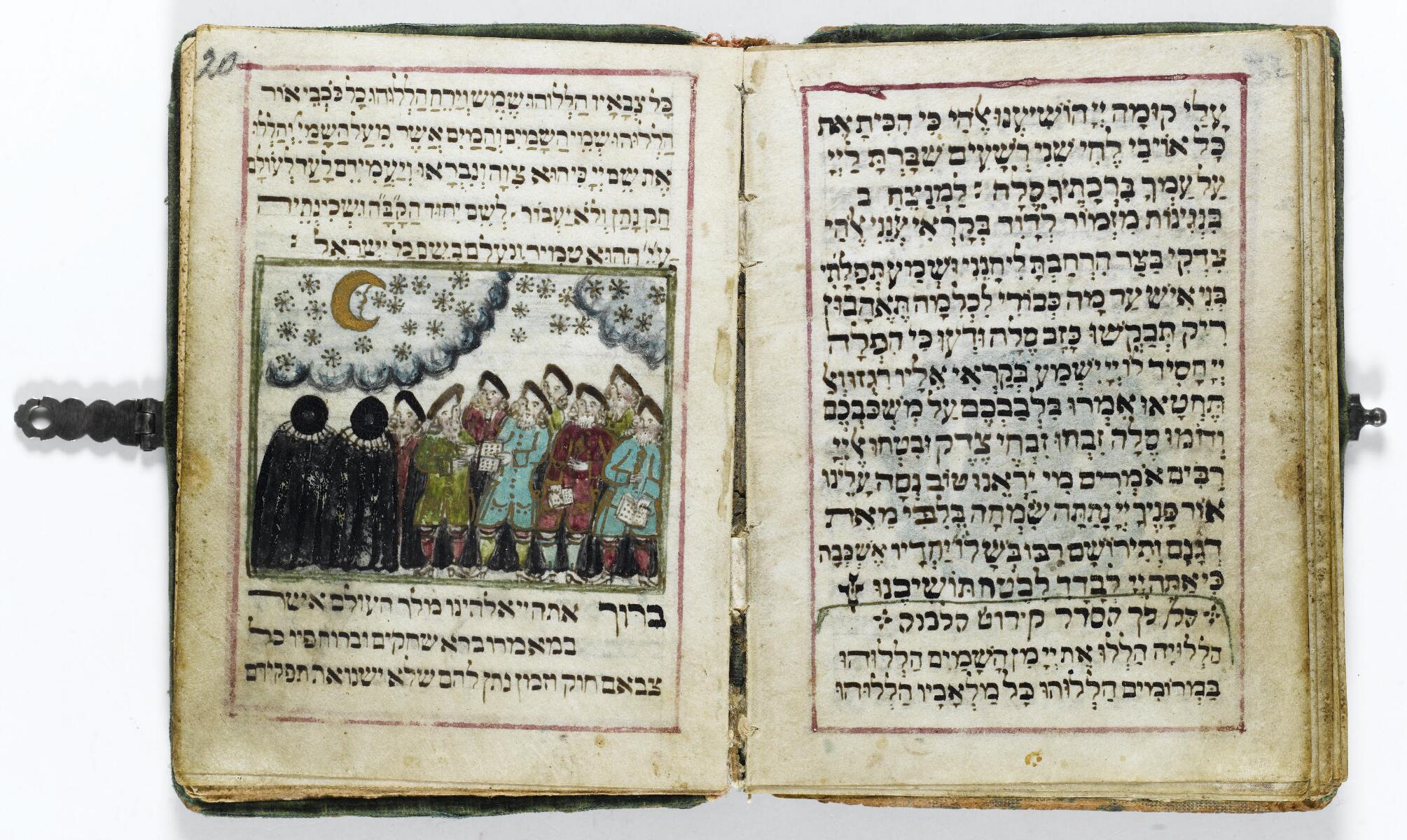
1728

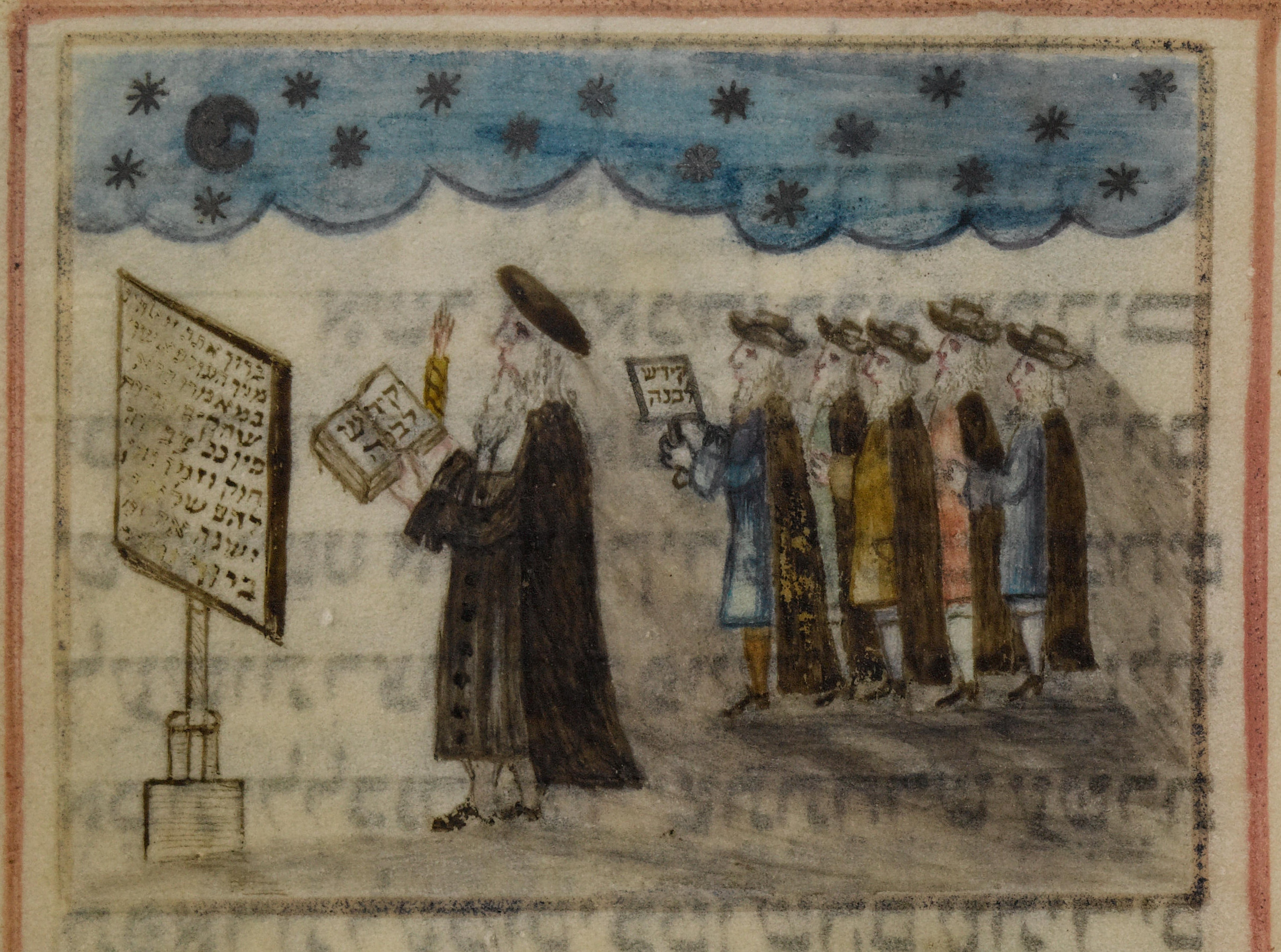
1736 (Netherlands?), by "Isaac" (Note: "A group of men is depicted outside the city saying the prayer for the New Moon. The image doubtlessly was taken from one of the many Minhagim booklets". Schrijver (1993). p. 97.)

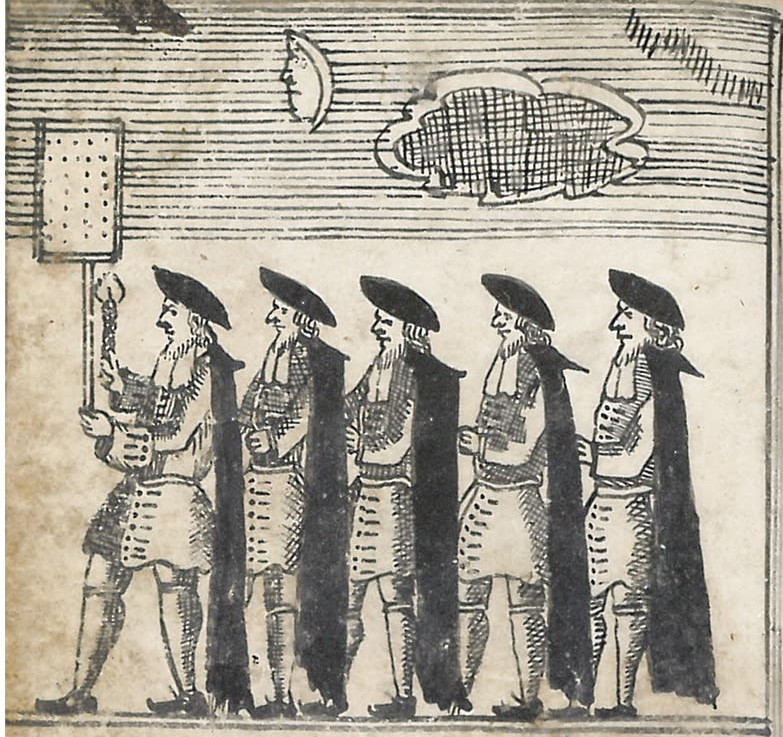
1738 (Germany)

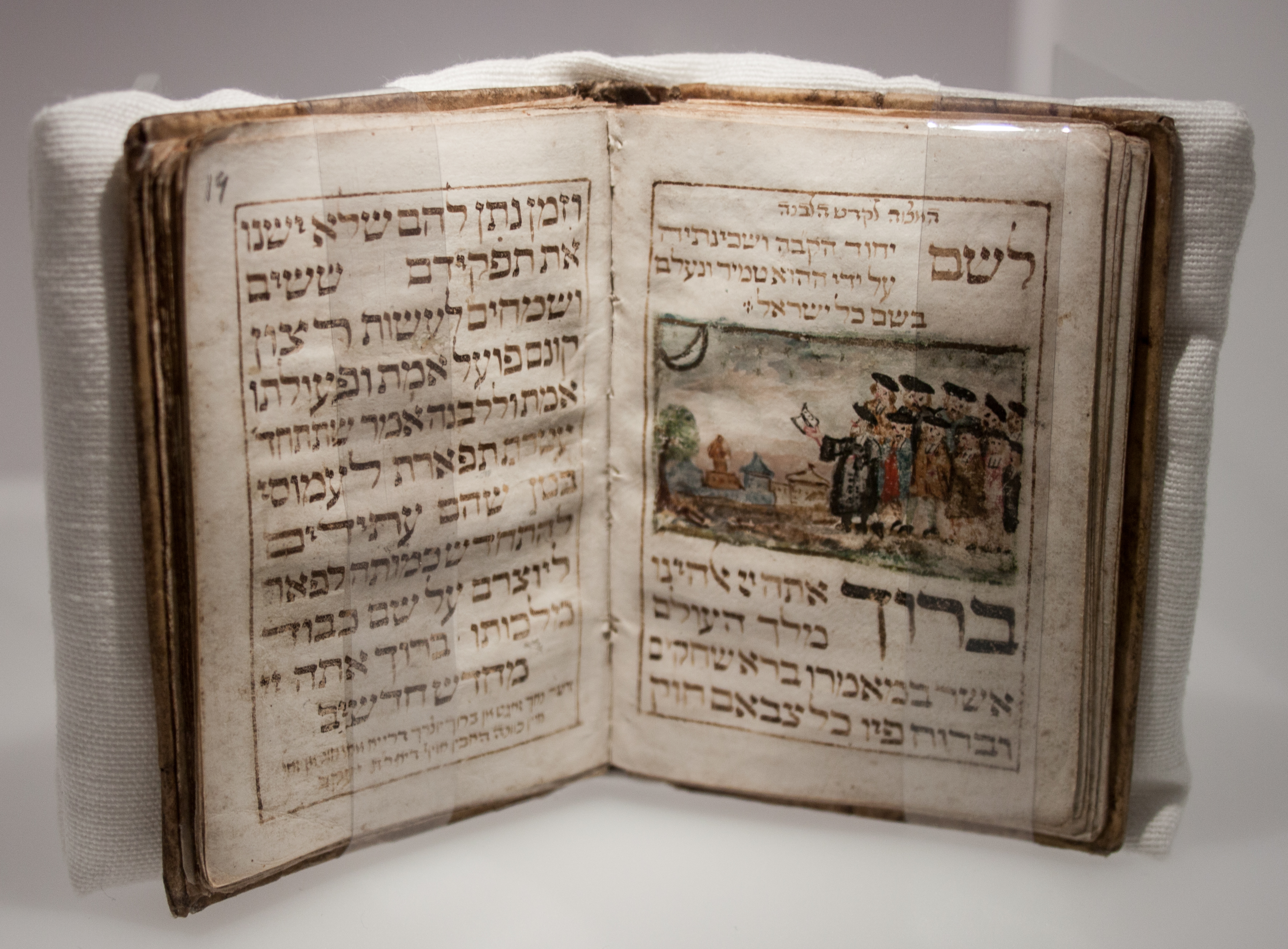
1739

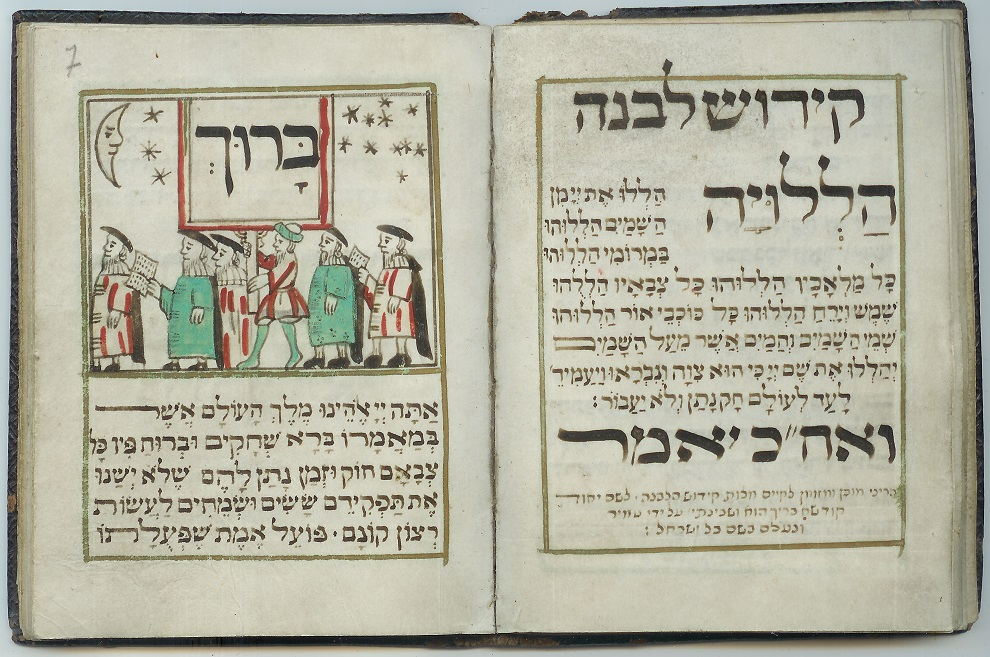
1752

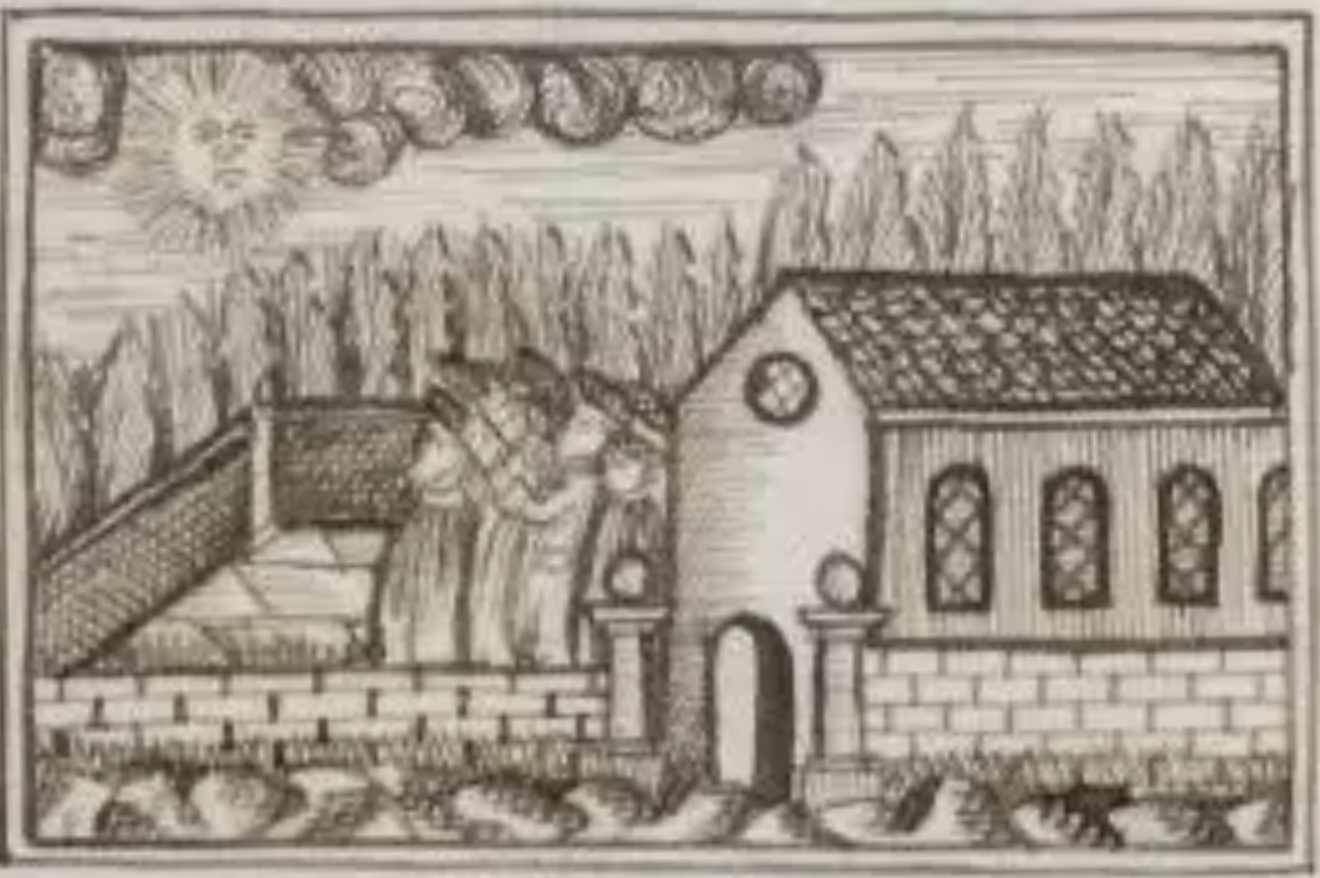
1768 (Nancy), by Levi Offenbach

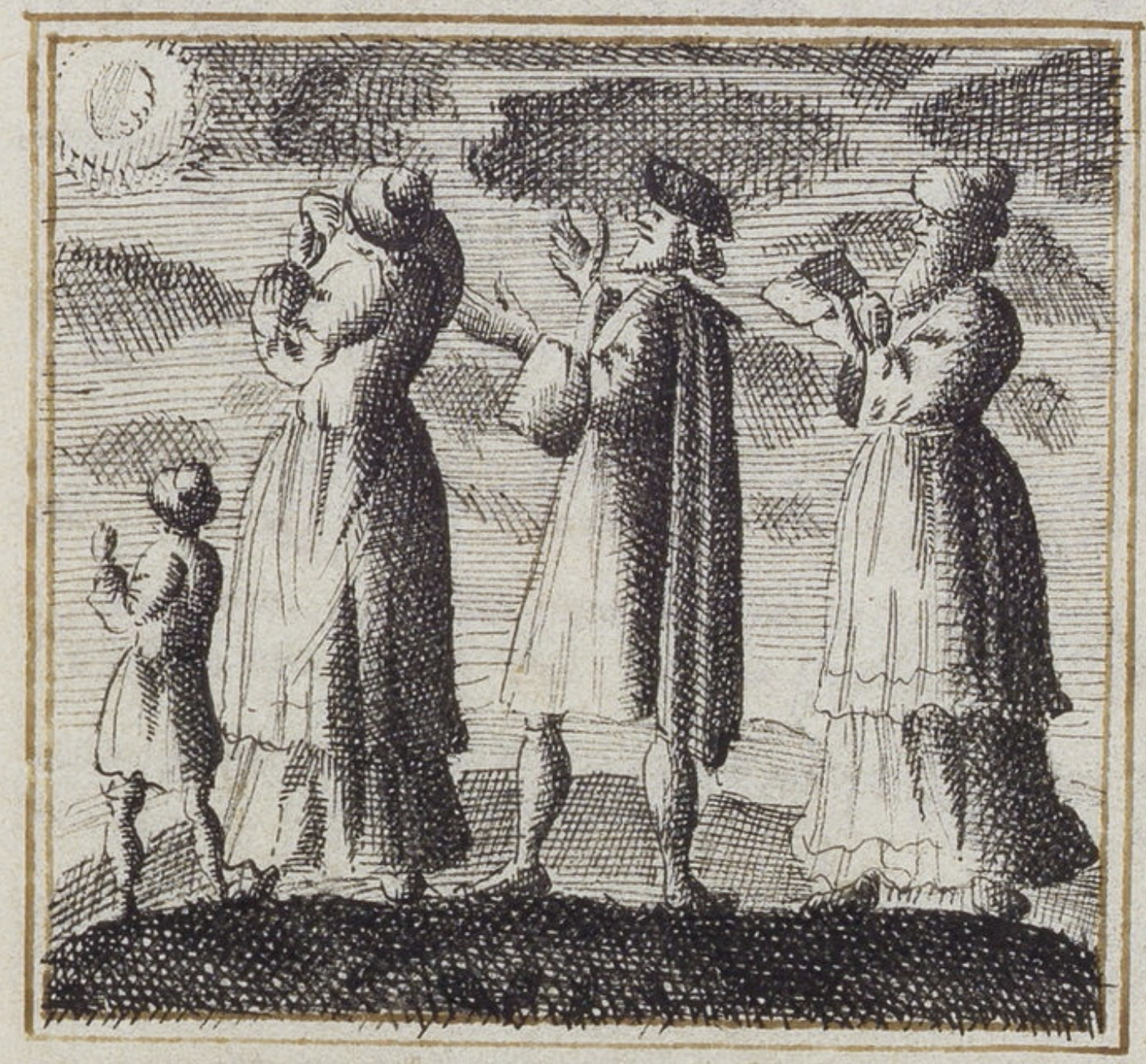
1775, by Wolf Leib Katz Poppers of Hildesheim

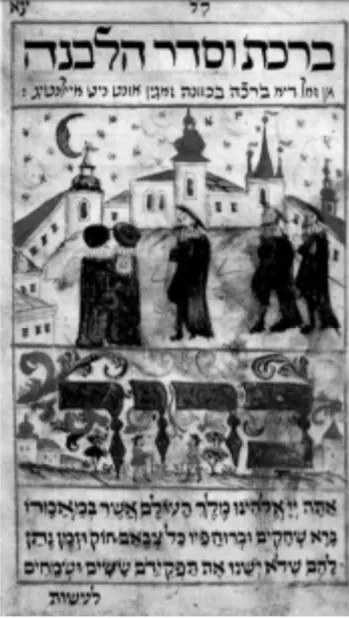
18th-century

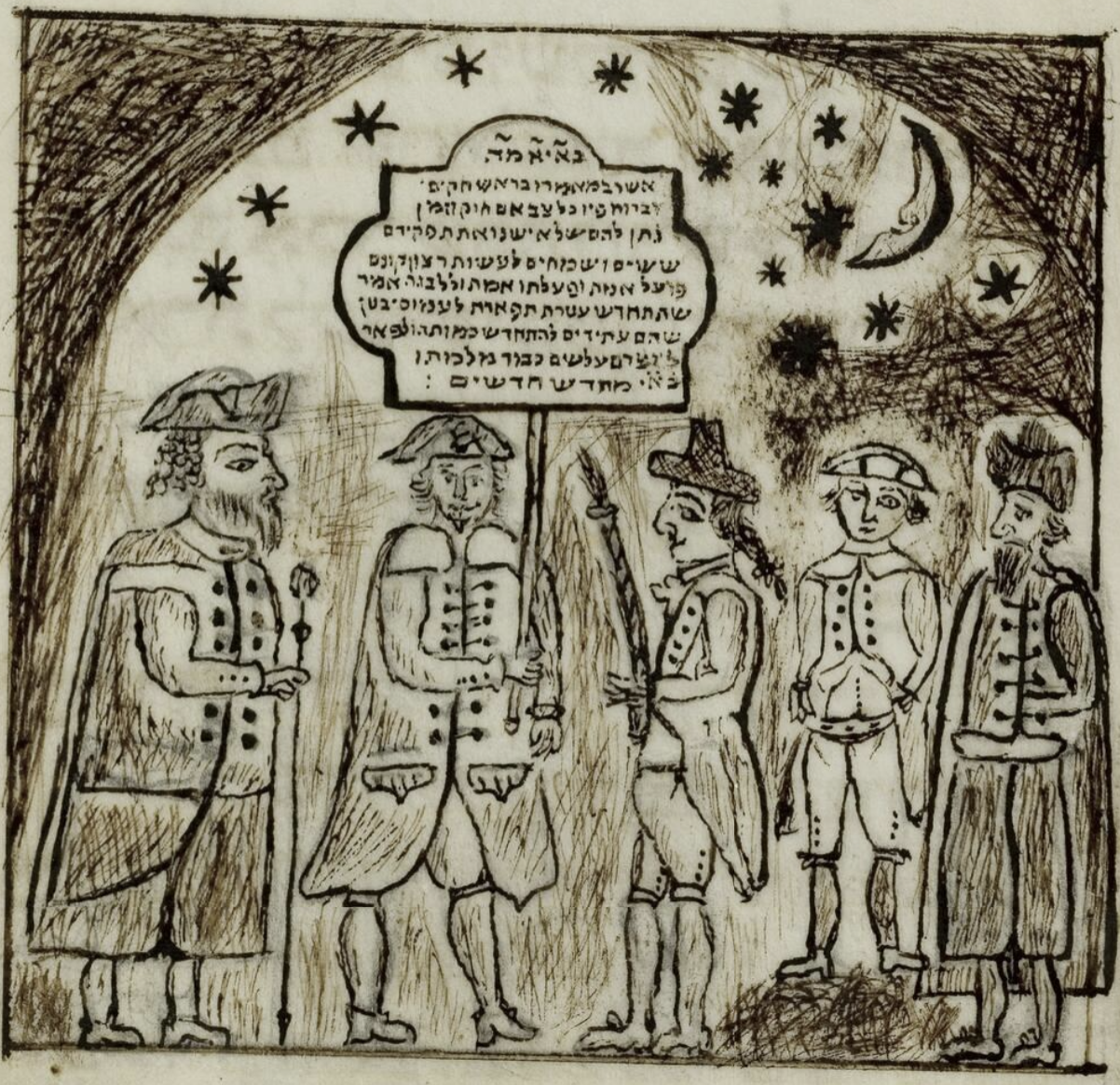
1795 (Amsterdam)

=== Artwork ===
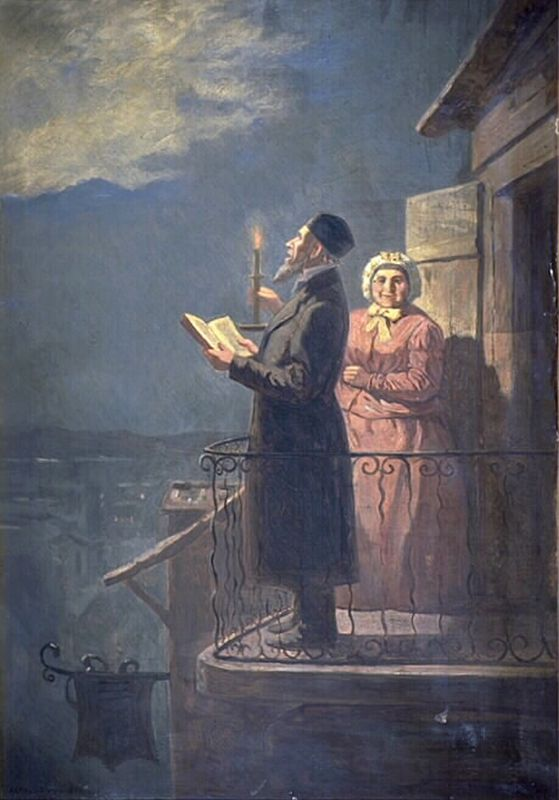
Blessing of the New Moon (1883) by Alphonse Levy (Note: Published as an etching in L'Univers illustré on 13 October 1883 (Retrieved March 16, 2025 - via MAHJ), and reviewed by Hippolyte Prague in Archives israélites on 18 October (Vol. XLIV. p. 335. Retrieved on January 19, 2025 – via Google Books). Emery I. Gondor created a similar image, with a man and boy, for Zeligs, Dorothy F. (1941). The Story of Jewish Holidays. p. 222.)

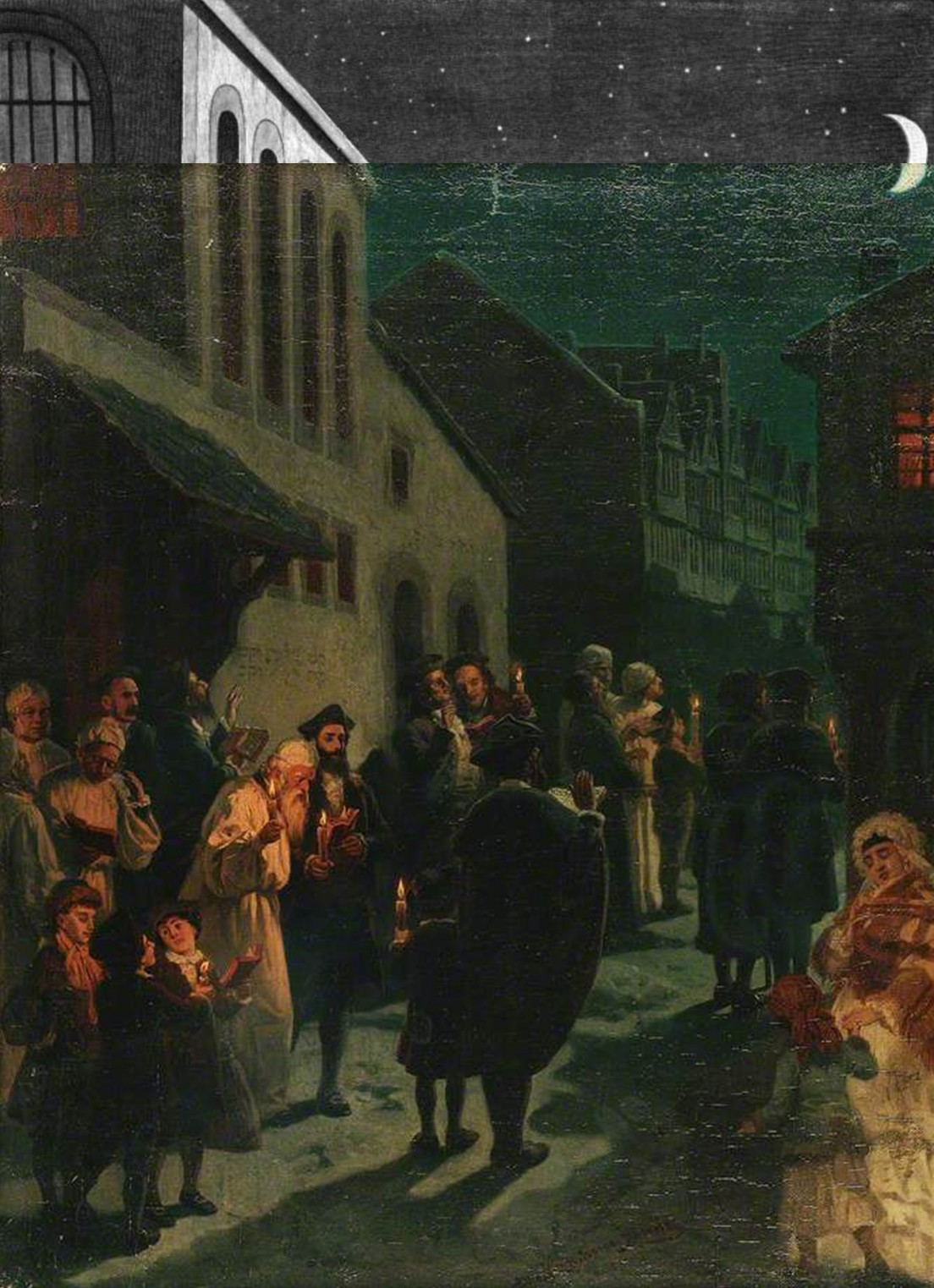
Blessing of the New Moon (1883) by Hermann Junker. (Note: Image shown is a composite which restores the missing upper margin from an engraving published in Über Land und Meer (1886), p. 705.) Moses Mendelssohn, Leopold Kompert, James de Rothschild, Salomon Popper (1839-1889), (Note: A cantor. See obituary in Cantoren-Zeitung for January 11, 1890. pp. 6-7.) and Elias Ullmann are seen in Frankfurt.

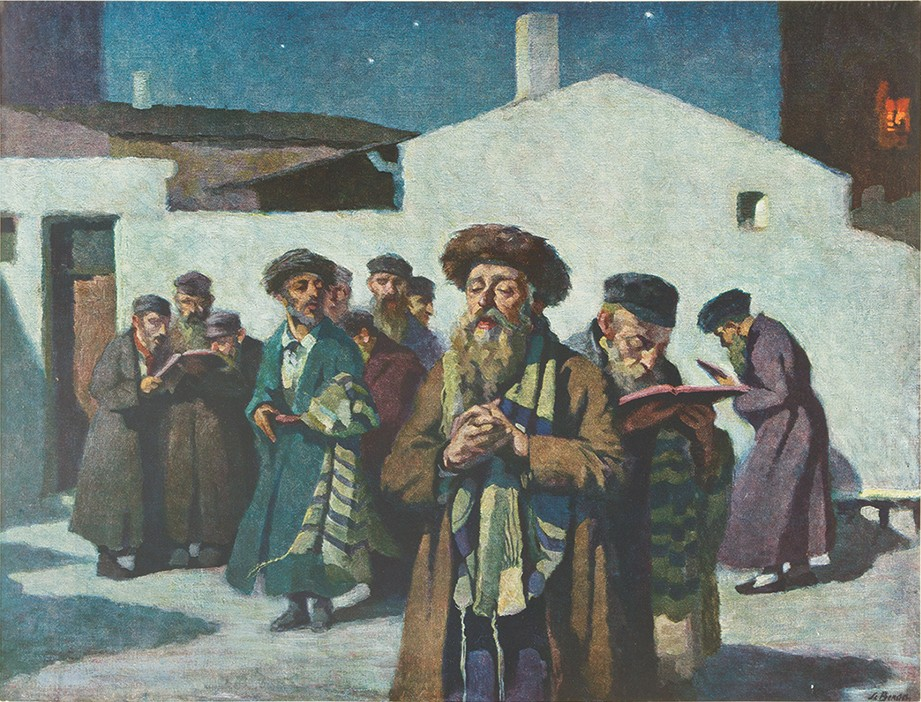
Moon Prayer (1919) by Stanisław Bender (Note: Advertised under the title Mondgebet. Panned by Yiddishe Tageblatt on June 11, 1922 p. [8].)

=== Liturgical displays ===
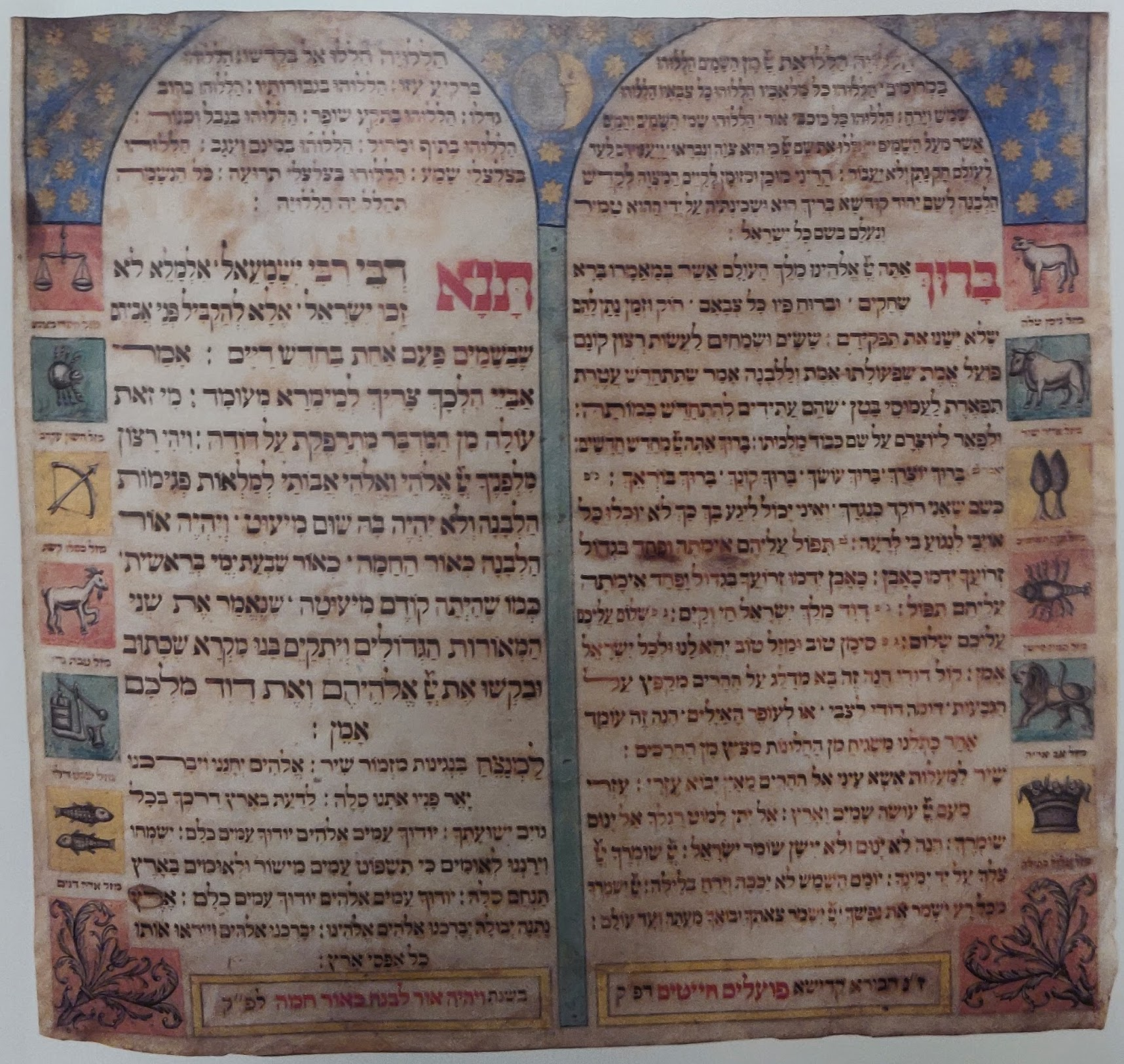
Broadsheet liturgy with zodiac decoration. Poland, 1850 (tempera on parchment). (Note: "By its very nature, the Blessing of the Moon was a subject that invited zodiac illustration". Fishof, Iris (ed.) (2001). Written in the Stars. p. 72. This item described as "In 1850 a Jewish tailors' society in Poland commissioned a broadsheet with the Blessing of the Moon (Kiddush levanah), which the folk artist painted in an East European style reminiscent of the wooden synagogue decoration and incorporating the zodiac signs". See also 18th-century illumination in §Gallery and Hachlili, Rachel (2013). Ancient Synagogues – Archaeology and Art. Brill. pp. 382–385.)

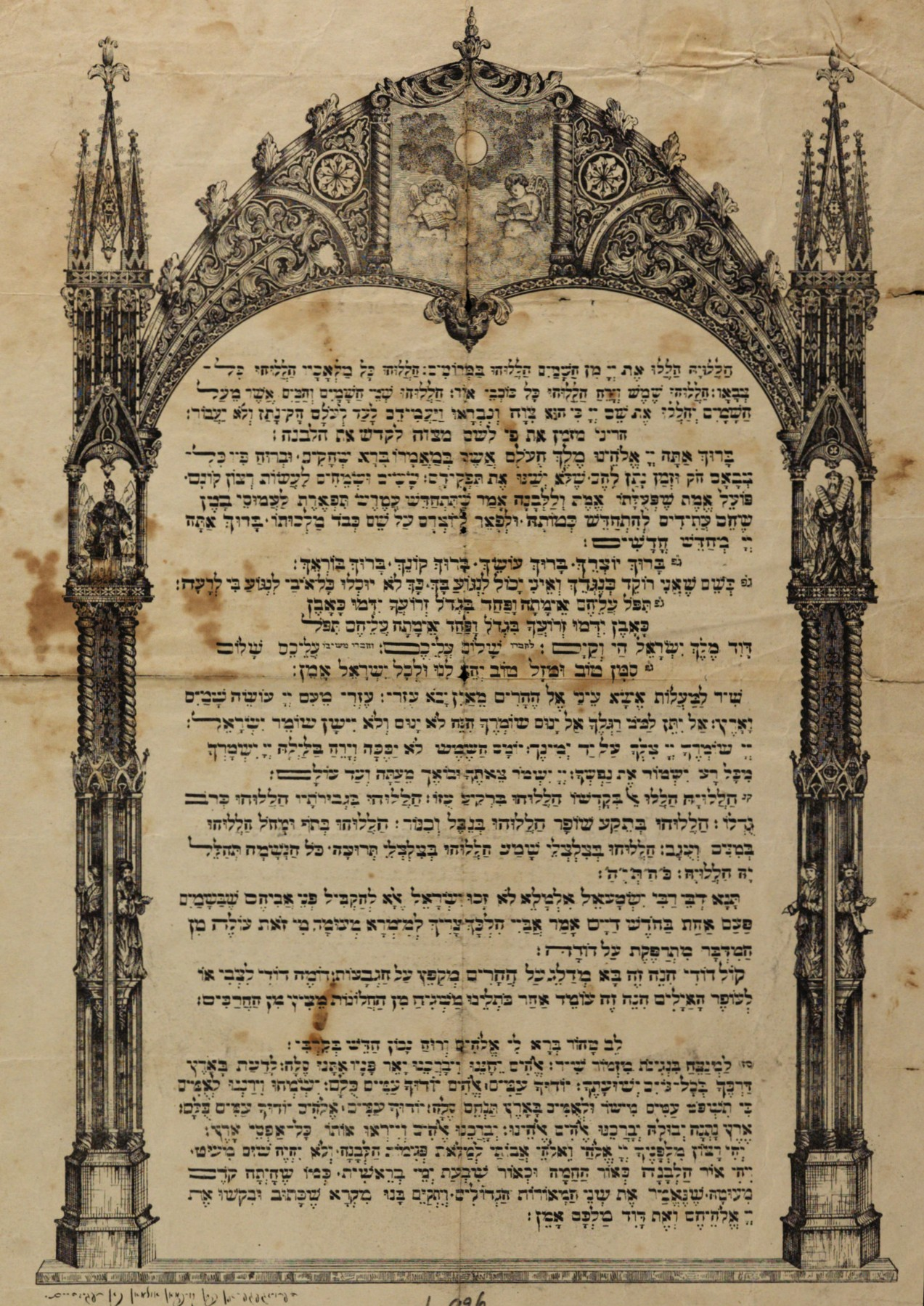
c. 1880, lithograph. Another copy discovered in the geniza of Dambach-la-Ville.

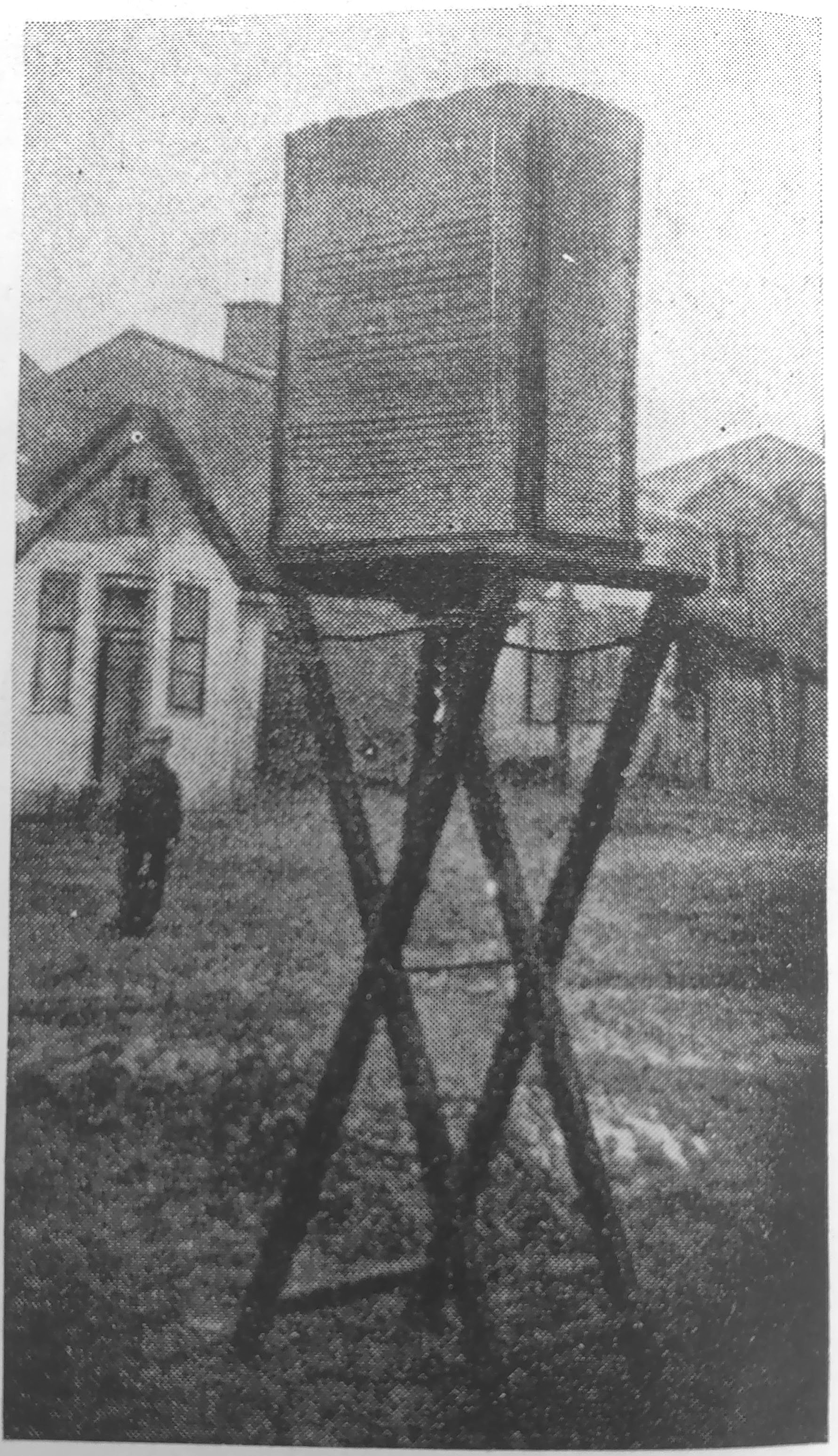
Etched-glass Kiddush levana lantern of Kamianka (pre-Holocaust)

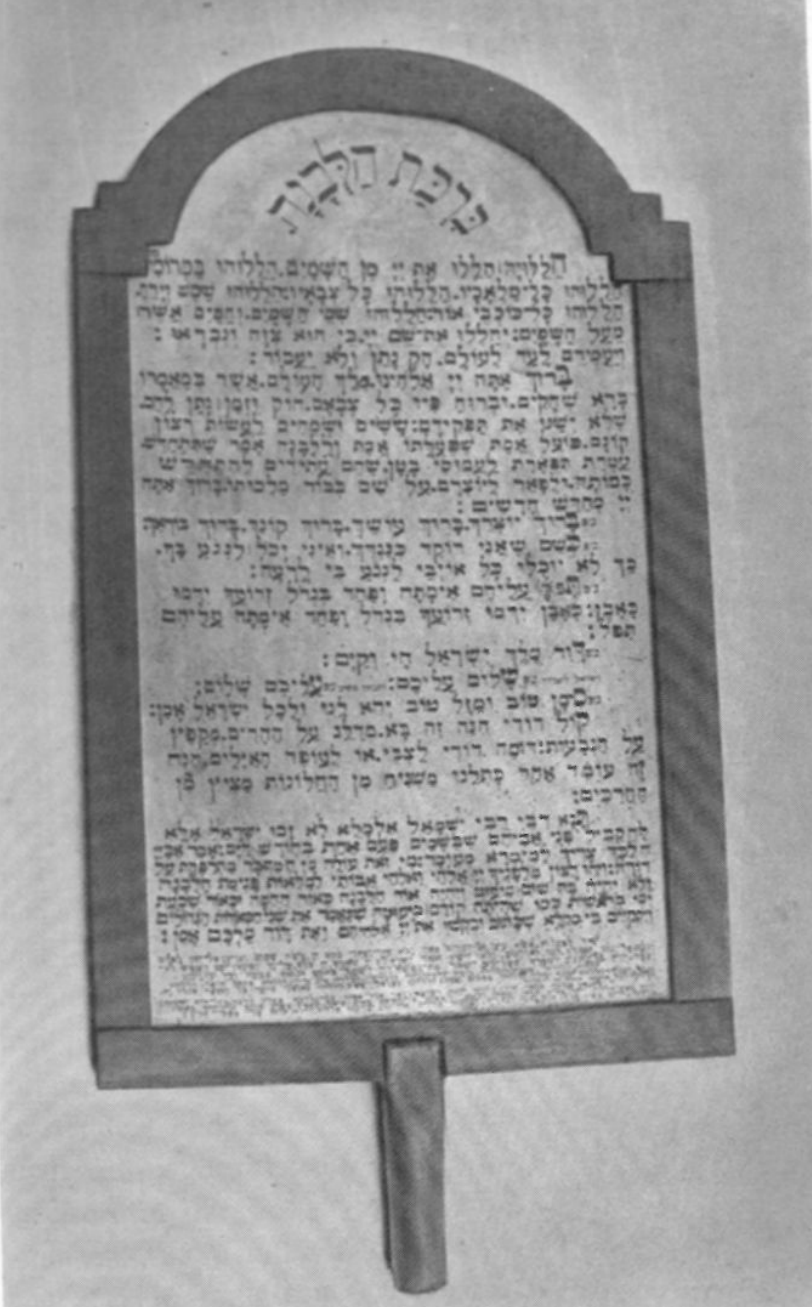
Wooden tablet of Bonyhád, with handwritten liturgy (pre-Holocaust)

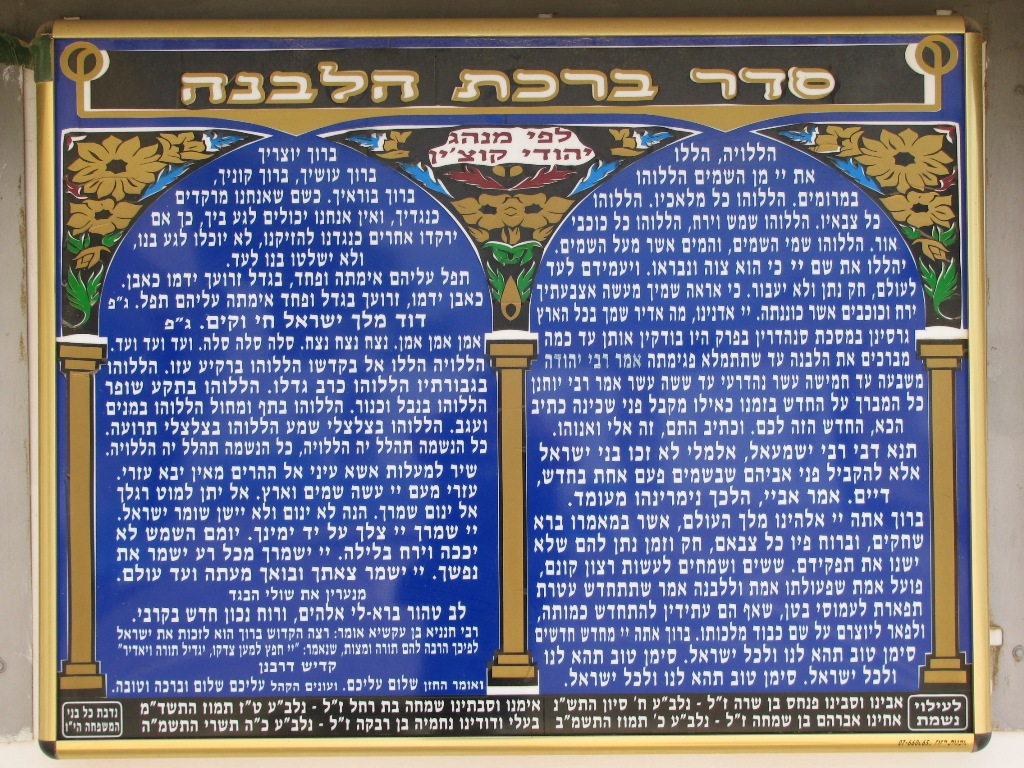
A poster used by the Cochin Jewish community in Nevatim

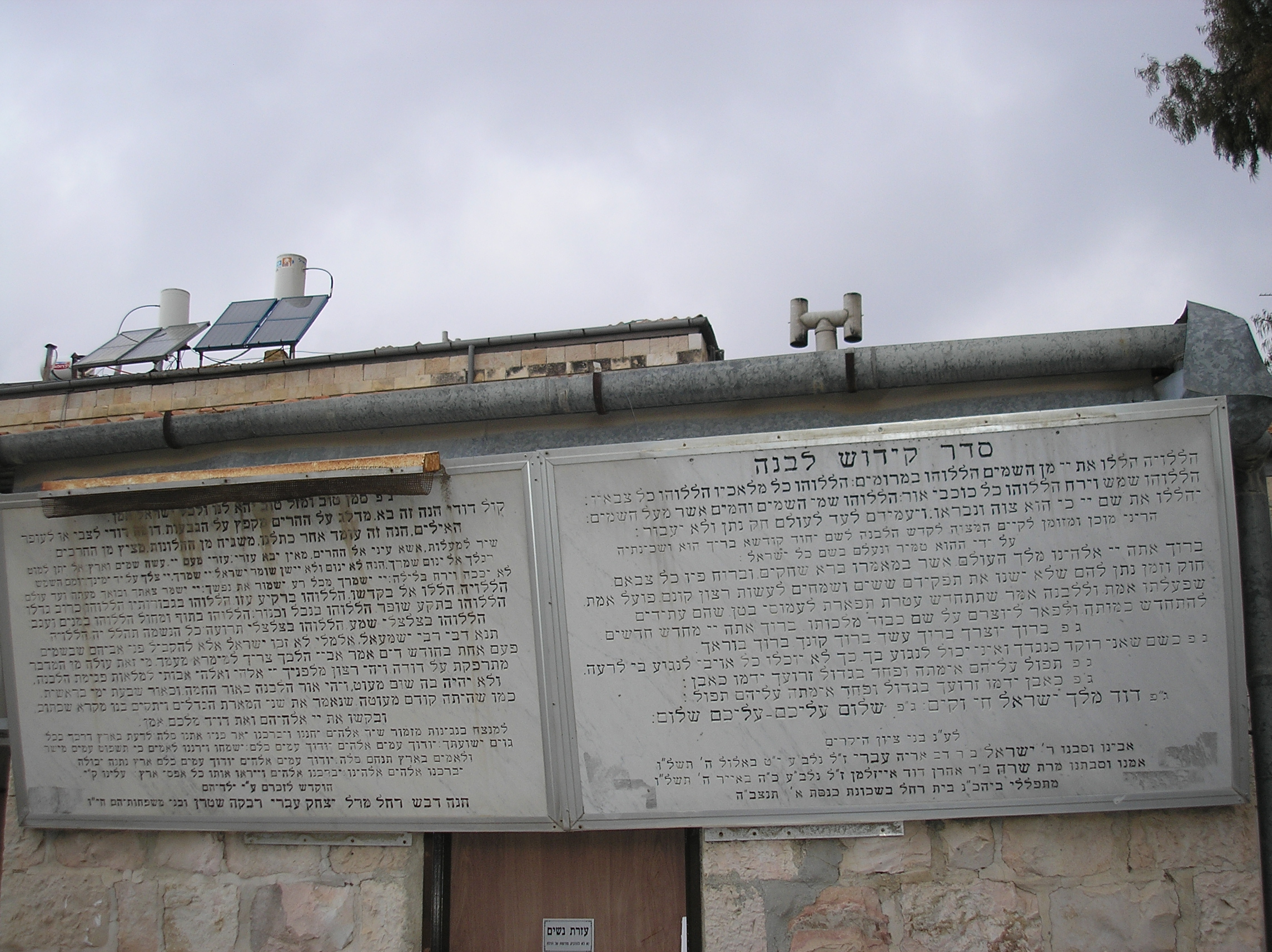
Beit Rachel Synagogue, in the Knesset Aleph neighborhood of Nahlaot

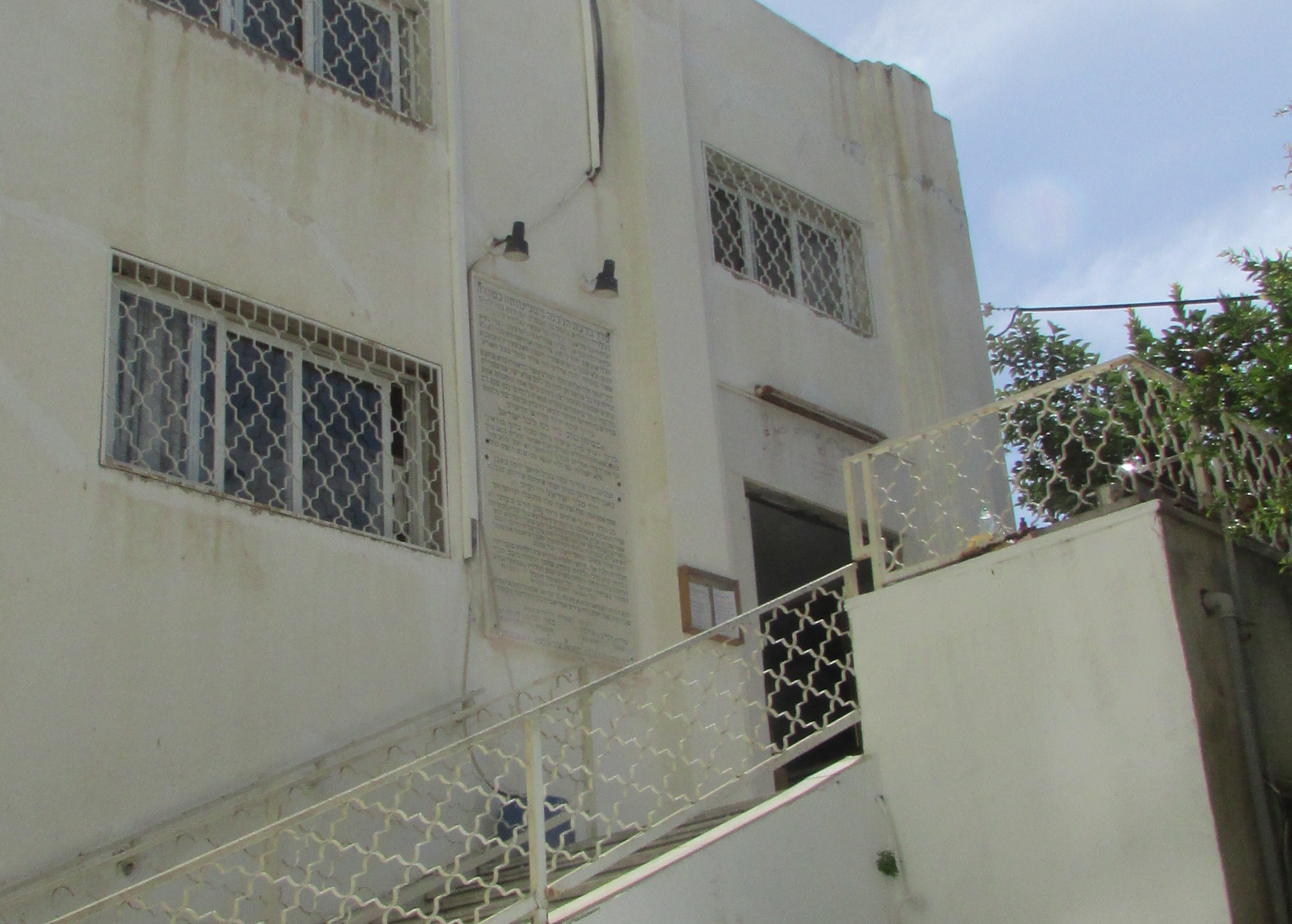
Libyan Synagogue, Jaffa

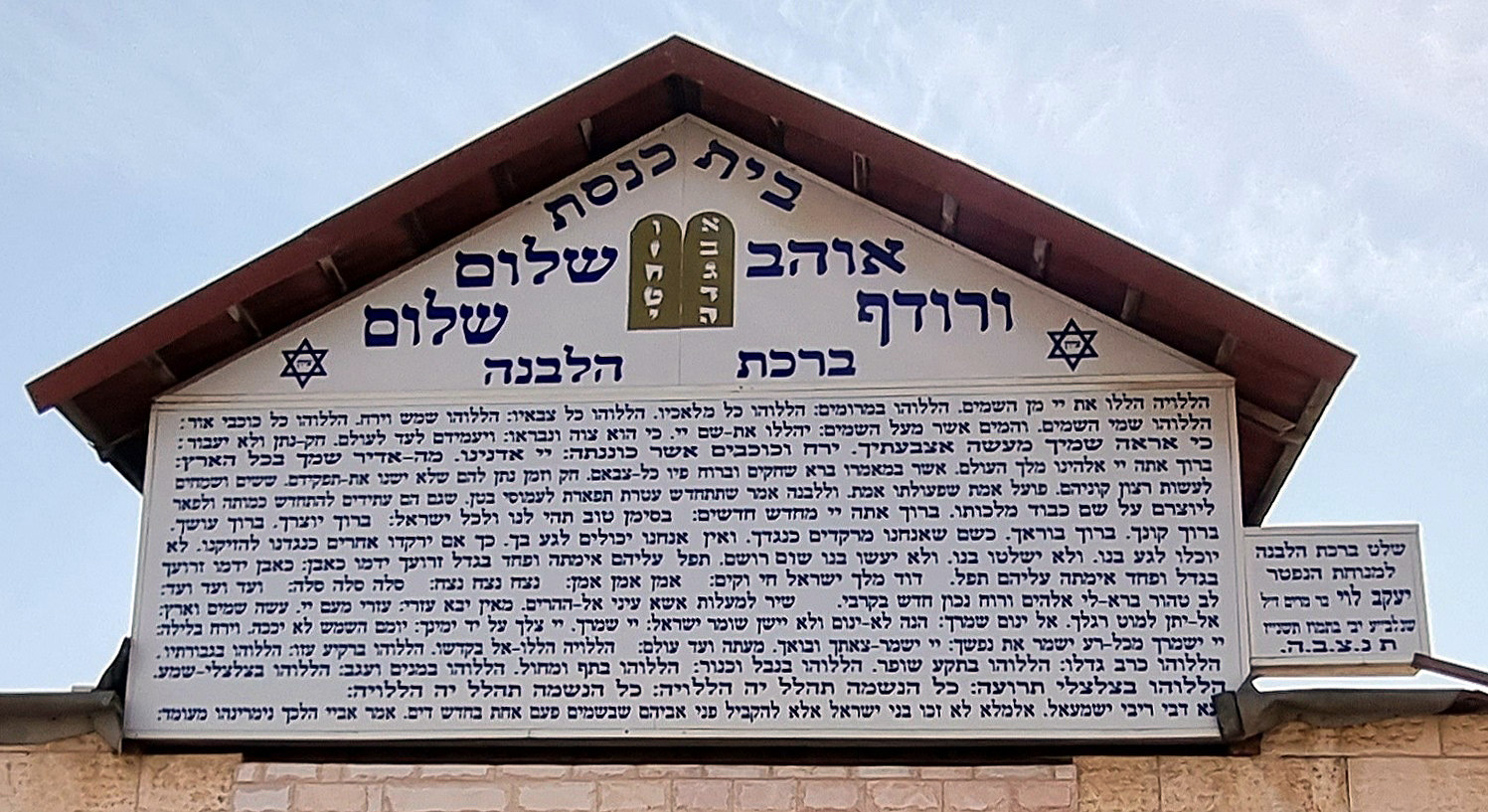
Ramla

== See also ==
- Lunar phase
- Jewish holidays
- Birkat Hachama
- Jewish prayer service
