= Hyde (surname) =

Hyde is a surname derived from the unit of measurement hide. It may refer to:

- Alex Hyde-White, English actor
- Anne Hyde (1637–1671), English noblewoman, mother of two British queens, Mary II and Anne
- Anne Hyde (historian), American historian and writer
- Arthur M. Hyde (1877–1947), American politician, Governor of Missouri, U.S. Secretary of Agriculture
- Brandon Hyde (born 1973), American baseball coach
- Carlos Hyde (born 1990), American football player
- D. J. Hyde, ring name of professional wrestler David Markland
- DeWitt S. Hyde (1909–1987), American politician, congressman from Maryland (1953–1959)
- Douglas Hyde (1860–1949), Irish-language scholar, first President of Ireland, (1938–1945)
- Edith Hyde, better known as Edith Hyde Robbins Macartney (1895–1978), first holder of the Miss America title
- Edward Hyde (disambiguation), several people, including:
  - Edward Hyde, 1st Earl of Clarendon (1609–1674), English historian and statesman
  - Edward Hyde, 3rd Earl of Clarendon (1661–1723), British nobleman, governor of New York and New Jersey
  - Edward Hyde (1667–1712), Governor of North Carolina
  - Edward Hyde (Cambridge cricketer)
- Formelda Hyde, American drag queen
- Frank Hyde (1916–2007), Australian rugby league footballer, coach and commentator
- Frank Hyde (footballer) (1927–2004), English footballer
- George Hyde (admiral) (1877–1937), Australian admiral
- George Hyde (athlete) (1905–1974), Australian long-distance runner
- George Hyde (bishop) (1923–2010), American clergyman
- George Hyde (gun designer) (1888–1963), American machinist, gunsmith, and gun designer
- George Hyde (Knight of the Bath) (1570–1623), Berkshire MP
- George Hyde (politician), mayor of pre-statehood San Francisco, California
- George Hyde (RAF officer) (1893–?), English World War I flying ace
- George Hyde (shooting victim) (died 2001), Belizean police suspect
- George E. Hyde (1882–1968), U.S. historian of the American Indians
- George Gordon Hyde (1883–1946), Quebec (Canada) provincial politician and lawyer
- Glen and Bessie Hyde (both d. 1928), American couple lost in the Grand Canyon in 1928
- H. Montgomery Hyde (Harford Montgomery Hyde, 1907–1989), English author, lawyer
- Harry Hyde (1925–1996), crew chief in NASCAR stock car racing
- Helen Hyde (1868–1919), American etcher and engraver
- Henry Hyde (disambiguation), several people, including:
  - Henry Hyde (1924–2007), American politician, congressman from Illinois
  - Henry Baldwin Hyde (1834–1899), American businessman
  - Henry Hyde, 2nd Earl of Clarendon (1638–1709), British nobleman, Lord Privy Seal, Lord-Lieutenant of Ireland
  - Henry Hyde, 4th Earl of Clarendon and 2nd Earl of Rochester (1672–1753), English nobleman and politician
  - Henry Hyde, Viscount Cornbury (1710–1753), British nobleman
  - Henry J. Hyde (Medal of Honor) (1846–1893), American soldier
- Ira B. Hyde (1838–1926), American politician, congressman from Missouri
- Jake Hyde (b. 1990), English professional footballer
- James Hyde (disambiguation), several people, including:
  - James Hyde (actor) (b. 1962), American soap-opera actor
  - James Franklin Hyde (1903–1999), American chemist and inventor
- Jean-Guillaume, baron Hyde de Neuville (1776–1857), French politician
- Jim Hyde (died 2018), Australian LGBT rights and health advocate, public health administrator, and academic
- Jeanette W. Hyde (1938–2025), American diplomat
- John Nelson Hyde (1865–1912), American missionary
- Jonathan Hyde (b. 1947), Australian actor
- Kenneth Hyde (1930–86), English historian
- Laurance M. Hyde (1892–1978), American jurist, chief justice of the Missouri Supreme Court
- Laurence Hyde, 1st Earl of Rochester (1641–1711), English statesman and writer
- Lewis Hyde (b. 1945), American scholar and author
- M. Deborrah Hyde (b. 1949), American neurosurgeon
- Maria Jane Hyde (b. 1969), British musical actress
- Marie Agnes H. Hyde (1882–1978), American artist
- Marina Hyde (born 1974), English columnist
- Miriam Hyde (1913–2005), Australian composer, pianist, poet, and music educator
- Nicholas Hyde (d. 1631), British lawyer, Lord Chief Justice of England
- Orson Hyde (1805–1878), American Mormon, leader in the Latter Day Saint movement
- Pearl Hyde (1904–1963), Lord Mayor of Coventry, England
- Randall Hyde (b. 1960), American programmer and author
- Rosel H. Hyde (1900–1992), American lawyer
- Sam Hyde (born 1993), English boxer
- Samuel C. Hyde (1842–1922), American politician, congressman from Washington (1895–1897)
- Samuel W. Hyde (b. 1985), American comedian, writer and actor
- Thomas Hyde (1637–1703), English orientalist
- Tyler Hyde, English musician
- Wilfrid Hyde-White (1903–1991), English actor
- Will Hyde (born 1999), Australian singer-songwriter and producer
- William Hyde (journalist) (1835–1898)

== See also ==
- Hide (disambiguation)
