= Yom Tov =

Yom Tov or Yom-Tov may refer to:

== Judaism ==
- Jewish holidays, lit. "Good Day" in Hebrew
- Yom tov sheni shel galuyot, a concept in halakha
- Yom Tov Torah readings

== People ==
- Chananya Yom Tov Lipa (disambiguation) (name of two rabbis)
- David ben Yom Tov, medieval Catalan Jewish astronomer and astrologer
- David ben Yom Tov ibn Bilia, medieval Portuguese Jewish philosopher
- Jacob ben David ben Yom Tov, medieval Catalan Jewish astronomer and astrologer
- Yom Tov Asevilli (1250 – 1330), medieval rabbi and Halakhist
- Yom Tov Ehrlich (1914 – 1990), Hasidic musician and composer
- Yom-Tov Lipmann Heller (1578 – 1654), Bohemian rabbi and Talmudist
- Yom Tov Lipman Lipkin (1846 – 1876), Lithuanian Jewish mathematician and inventor
- Yom-Tov Lipmann-Muhlhausen, medieval Talmudist, kabalist and philosopher
- Yom Tov of Joigny (d. 1190), medieval French-born rabbi and liturgical poet
- Yom-Tov Samia, Israeli general
- Yom Tov Tzahalon (1559 – 1638), religious and legal scholar
