= Alilot Devarim =

15th-century Hebrew-language satirical polemic

Sefer Alilot Devarim (Hebrew: ספר עלילות דברים, lit. 'Book of False Charges' or 'Book of Accusations' (Note: The title is taken from Deut. 22:14, where it may be literally rendered "wantonness of words".)) is a 15th-century rationalist satirical polemic by the pseudonymous "Rabbi Palmon, (Note: An otherwise unknown name.) whose father Peleth had no pedigree, whose mother was the daughter of so-and-so". It harshly critiques halakhic interpretation, Kabbalah, magic, superstition, the commentary of Rashi, and the Ashkenazi rabbinical tradition of pilpul.

== Overview ==
Ben Peleth is possibly the earliest pseudonymous author in Jewish literature. The pseudonym is a reference to On ben Pelet, who appears as one of the rebels in the story of Korah in Numbers 16. Alilot Devarim is a bitterly sarcastic work. Although the author admits Rashi's Talmudic scholarship is remarkable, he caustically writes that Rashi's biblical commentaries "blinded the eyes of the righteous, threw them in chains and brought upon them confusion, since most of his sayings are not interpretations at all, but Talmudic homilies" which distort the plain meaning of the Tanakh. The author is critical of obscurantism. The work praises Abraham ibn Ezra and Maimonides. It was commonly believed by scholars that the author likely was not Ashkenazi himself, but Sephardic living in Italy. Lawee and Ta-Shma, however, believe the author to be more likely Ashkenazic himself.

Cultural context most likely places the work's composition in Italy. The author criticizes the Ashkenazic rabbis' prowess at logic, philosophy, and rhetoric which he finds lacking. He criticizes the "God-fearers" who suffer to increase their reward and believe that the reward will accompany their suffering, and spend their time smoothing over discrepancies in talmudic writings. He excoriates Rashi and accuses him of being "devoid of the science of logic", refers to pilpul as "bilbul" (confusion), and ascribes to Ashkenazi superstitions and practices the overall decay of Judaism. Despite this, it does not actually mention the word "Ashkenazim", suggesting that the author did not necessarily view the critique in ethnic or collective terms.

Two 15th-century manuscripts survive, one copied in 1468 by Isaiah ben Jacob Aluf of Masserano, the other in 1473 by Abraham Farissol. Many small differences separate these two manuscripts. Isaac Samuel Reggio prepared a copy of the 1468 MS for publication in 1831, but the project failed. Alilot Devarim was finally printed from the 1473 MS in 1863, by Raphael Kirchheim under the pseudonym "Michael ben Reuben".

Alilot Devarim is generally considered a "self-commenting text", because it is accompanied in manuscript by a running commentary, as long as the work itself, signed "Joseph ben Meshullam". Joseph's work is stylistically identical to Palmon's, and both appear in the same 1468 copy. Palmon declares that it has been "1,400 years (Note: In the 1468 MS, "nearly 1,400 years". In the 1473, "more than 1,400 years". The Second Temple was destroyed in 70 CE. Bonfil argues that this line was updated by each scribe and cannot be used to date the original text.) since the destruction of the temple", suggesting an original date for Alilot Devarim not long before 1468, but Joseph writes that "you know of the great difficulty I had in retrieving this book from its hiding place, torn and defaced, mostly illegible . . ." Heinrich Graetz proposed that they share authorship and "Joseph ben Meshullam" was Palmon ben Pelet's true name. Raphael Kirchheim tentatively identified Palmon with Aaron ben Gershon abu al-Rabi and Joseph with Joseph ibn Shem-Tov. Eric Lawee believes that Joseph ben Meshullam is another pseudonym for the same shared author and leans toward al-Rabi as a possibility. The 1468 manuscript may refer to Joseph ben Meshullam as "Joseph Alilo". Moritz Steinschneider attributed both to Abraham Farissol, who copied a 1473 manuscript of the work. Robert Bonfil dates the work earlier, to the 1360s, naming Joseph ben Eliezer Bonfils as a possible author.

"Ben Meshullam" considers the midrashim to be mere "poetical conceits", which is a reference to Maimonides' Guide to the Perplexed.

== See also ==
- Jewish polemics and apologetics in the Middle Ages
- Maimonidean Controversy
