= George Hyde =

George Hyde may refer to:

- George Hyde (admiral) (1877–1937), Australian admiral
- George Hyde (athlete) (1905–1974), Australian long-distance runner
- George Hyde (bishop) (1923–2010), American clergyman
- George Hyde (gun designer) (1888–1963), American machinist, gunsmith, and gun designer
- George Hyde (Knight of the Bath) (1570–1623), Berkshire MP
- George Hyde (politician), mayor of pre-statehood San Francisco, California
- George Hyde (RAF officer) (1893–?), English World War I flying ace
- George Hyde (shooting victim) (died 2001), Belizean police suspect
- George E. Hyde (1882–1968), U.S. historian of the American Indians
- George Gordon Hyde (1883–1946), Quebec (Canada) provincial politician and lawyer
