= Kimhi =

Kimhi, Kimchi, Kamhe, or Kamche (Hebrew: קִמְחִי or קַמְחִי) is a Jewish surname of disputed origin. Notable people with the surname include:

== Medieval ==
- Joseph ben Isaac Kimhi (1105–1170), biblical commentator and poet, father of David and Moses Kimhi
- Moses Kimhi (c. 1127 – c. 1190), biblical commentator and grammarian
- David Kimhi (1160–1235), biblical commentator, philosopher, and grammarian
- Isaac ben Mordecai ibn Kimhi of Salon, "Mestre Petit de Nyons" (f. 1290), Talmudist
- David ben Joseph Kimhi of Frascati (fl. 1326), author of a biblical commentary (found MS Angelica 1.2)
- Samuel ben Moses Kimhi of Sicily (fl. 1342), author of a commentary to Perek Shira
- Joseph ben Saul Kimhi, author of the Mezuqqaq Shiv'atayim (1380) and a brief commentary to the astronomical tables of Jacob Boneth ben David Bonjorn, as well as other lost works. This is apparently the same scholar called Joseph ben Saul of Bannieres (מובנייר) in philosophical literature.

Several medieval letters mentioning Salama ben Joseph al-Kamha and Abu al-Fadhl ben al-Kamha were found in the Cairo Geniza, which may be the same name.

== Modern ==
- Solomon Kimhi (fl. 1862), Turkish rabbi
- Rafael Moshe Kamhi (1870–1970), IMRO revolutionary
- Jon Kimche (1909–1994), Swiss journalist
- Victoria Kamhi (1905–1997), Turkish pianist
- David Kimche (1928–2010), Israeli diplomat and deputy-director of Mossad
- David Kamhi (1936–2021), hazan of the Sarajevo Synagogue
- Michelle Marder Kamhi (born 1937), art critic
- Alan Kimche (born 1952), British-Israeli rabbi
- Alona Kimhi (born 1963), Israeli author and actress
- Katherine Kamhi (born 1964), American actress
- Shavit Kimchi (born 2002), Israeli tennis player

== Other ==
- Zalman Kimhi (1904), short story by Yehuda Steinberg

== See also ==
- Khimki, Russian city
- Kimchi (disambiguation)
