= Collimated transmission theory =

The collimated transmission method is a direct way of measuring the optical properties of materials. It is especially useful for sensing the optical properties of tissues to guide developments of both diagnostic and therapeutic techniques. These optical properties are described by the absorption coefficient μ_{a}, scattering coefficient μ_{s}, and anisotropy factor g.

In the collimated transmission method, a laser beam is directed perpendicularly to the material and the detection of reemitted light gives information about the total interactive effect of the optical properties of the material. The use of multiple wavelengths can produce a spectra with more detailed information about the composition of the tissue or material (spectroscopy). While this method is simple and requires only minimal instrumentation, it produces error related to multiple scattering events and specular reflection. Some useful equations governing the properties include:

μ_{a} = absorption coefficient = N_{a}𝜎_{a}; μ_{s} = scattering coefficient = N_{s}𝜎_{s}; g = scattering anisotropy = <cos(𝛳)>; μt = extinction coefficient = μ_{a} + μ_{s}

Where N_{a} is the number of absorbers in a medium, 𝜎_{a} is the absorption cross section, N_{s} is the number of scatterers in a medium, 𝜎_{s} is the scattering cross section, and 𝛳 is the scattering angle.

== History ==
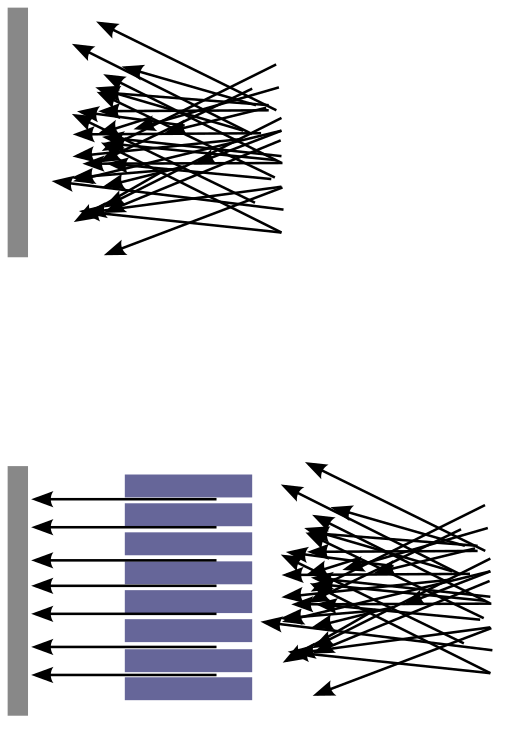
Illustration of collimator filtering a stream of rays

The collimated transmission method has been used to measure the optical properties of biological tissues since the early 1980s. A collimated light source was generated by a laser or with a diffuse source and a collimator. Unscattered light transmission through the tissue was detected and Beer's law was used to estimate the extinction coefficient μ_{t}. This was done for human, porcine, rodent, bovine, and chicken tissues and compared with theoretical models to predict reliable optical properties. Knowledge of these properties were crucial for dosimetry studies.

Additionally, this method has been applied to measuring optical properties of turbid media for improving the simulation of tissue phantoms.

By the late 1980s, several studies also tested optical properties of biological tissues at different wavelengths to produce spectra.

== Theory ==
The general setup for collimated transmission is as follows:

1) A collimated light source travels through the sample

2) Transmitted light is filtered by two pinholes

3) A photodetector collects the transmitted (mainly ballistic) photons

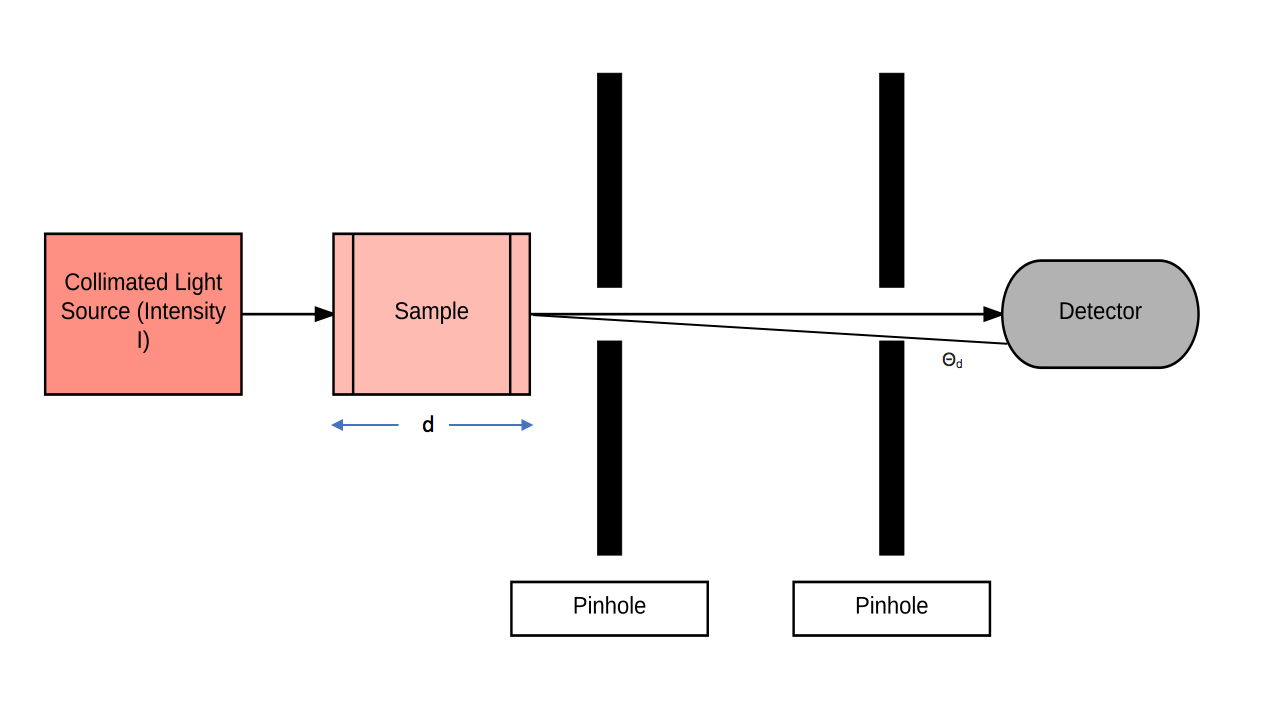
Illustration of collimated transmission method

A clear medium, whose refractive index closely matches that of the sample to be tested, must be measured to provide a reference ballistic-light signal I_{o}. This calibration step is included to account for any light intensity that is lost at the interfaces of the cuvette or other sample holder. Intensity loss can occur due to reflection at either interface and/or absorption by the cuvette.

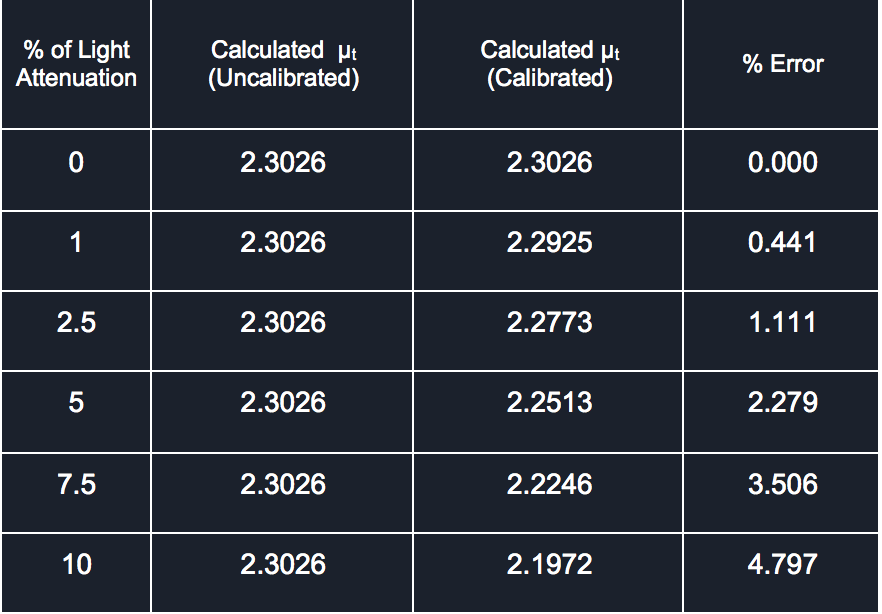
Assuming different amounts of light intensity attenuation due to sample holder, differences in calculated extinction coefficients for including calibration and ignoring calibration phase and the associated percent error

Once a reference signal is acquired, it is compared to the transmitted light Is of the measured sample. In order to calculate the associated extinction coefficient μ_{t} , Beer's law can be applied as follows: I_{s} = I_{o}exp(-μ_{t} d), where d is the sample thickness. The extinction coefficient is therefore: μ_{t} = -ln(I_{s}/I_{o})/d.

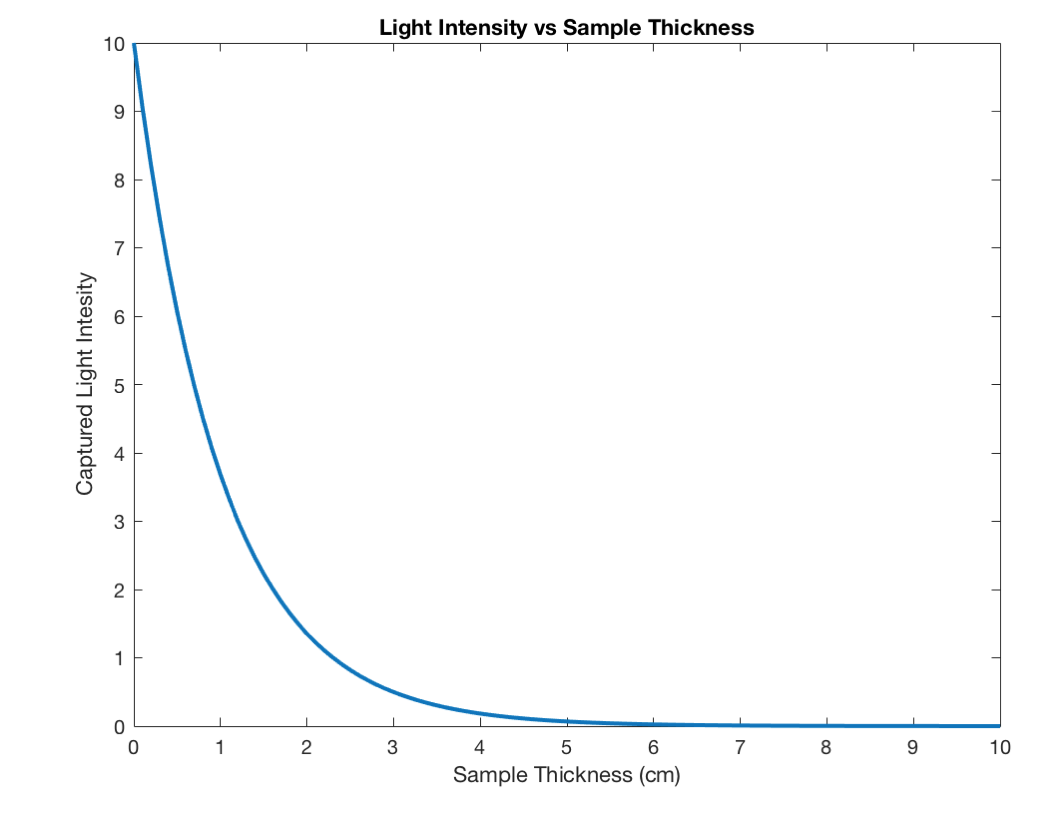
Example figure of Beer's Law, indicating decreased light intensity as sample thickness increases

== Applications ==
Spectrophotometry: Quantitative measurement of transmittance based on wavelength. It is important in a number of biomedical fields ranging from the measurement of a solute in a sample to determining enzyme kinetics for a given substrate-enzyme pair. Spectrophotometry requires multiple wavelengths for a wide variety of samples. Therefore, an arc lamp is used to generate multiple wavelengths for collimating mirrors and diffraction gratings to generate collimated light at narrow bandwidths.

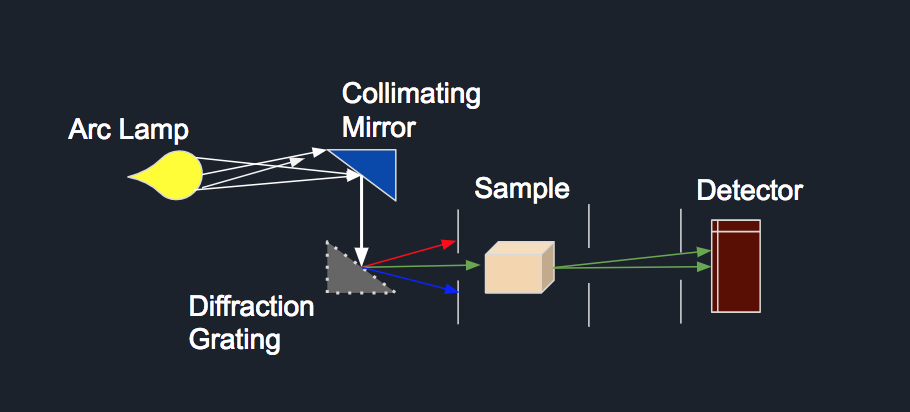
Spectrophotometry Illustration

Pulse oximetry is a non-invasive clinical technique that utilizes collimated light transmission in order to measure oxygen saturation. Two wavelengths are passed through a thin piece of tissue (earlobe or fingertip) and a photodetector on the other side detects the transmission at each wavelength. Due to the changing absorbance at varying wavelengths, it is possible to derive the absorbances due to arterial blood and exclude absorbances due to venous blood, skin, etc.

This technology is utilized for the specific determination of certain optical properties such as absorption coefficients and scattering coefficients. Homogeneous and inhomogeneous media can be analyzed in order to learn these parameters. In addition to the purity of the sample, a variety of material types can be analyzed by this method. Agarose, agar, water, polystyrene, TiO_{2}, and a variety of other materials can all be analyze utilizing this method. Aside from the experimental setup, there is limited technology required to gather and analyze the data.
