= Irish name =

A formal Irish name consists of a given name and a surname. In the Irish language, most surnames are patronymic surnames (distinct from patronyms, which are seen in Icelandic names for example). The form of a surname varies according to whether its bearer is a man, a woman, or a woman married to a man, who adopts his surname.

An alternative traditional naming convention consists of the first name followed by a double patronym, usually with the father and grandfather's names. This convention is not used for official purposes but is generalized in Gaeltachtaí (Irish-speaking areas) and also survives in some rural non-Gaeltacht areas. Sometimes the name of the mother or grandmother may be used instead of the father or grandfather.

== Epithets ==
A first name may be modified by an adjective to distinguish its bearer from other people with the same name. Mór ("big") and Óg ("young") are used to distinguish parent and child, like "senior" and "junior" are used in English, but are placed between the given name and the surname, e.g. Seán Óg Ó Súilleabháin corresponds to "John O'Sullivan Jr." (anglicised surnames often omit ⟨O'⟩, leaving no trace of original Ó e.g. "John Sullivan Jr.")

The word Beag ("little") can be used in place of Óg. This does not necessarily indicate that the younger person is smaller in stature, merely younger than their parent or in some cases to imply a baby was small, possibly premature, at birth.

Adjectives denoting hair colour may also be used, especially informally, e.g. Pádraig Rua ("red-haired Patrick"), Máire Bhán ("fair-haired Mary").

=== Traditional Gaeltacht names ===
Colloquially in Gaeltachtaí (Irish-speaking areas) and some other areas it remains customary to use a name formed by the first name (or nickname), followed by the father and the paternal grandfather's name, both in the genitive case, e.g. Seán Ó Cathasaigh (Seán O'Casey), son of Pól, son of Séamus, would be known to his neighbours as Seán Phóil Shéamuis. Occasionally, if the mother or grandmother was a well-known person locally, her name may be used instead. If the mother's name is used, then the maternal grandfather or grandmother may follow it, e.g. Máire Sally Eoghain.

This system can be particularly useful for distinguishing people who live in the same area and who share a common surname but are not closely related, e.g. two people named John McEldowney might be known as "John Patsy Dan" and "John Mary Philip" respectively. Even the Irish forms sometimes survive in parts of the Sperrins, so that among the principal families of Glenullin some branches are known by father/grandfather forms such as Pháidí Shéamais or Bhrian Dhónaill.

== Surnames ==
=== Ó and Mac surnames ===
A man's surname is generally formed by Ó ("descendant"; historically Ua) or Mac ("son") followed by a name or definite noun (often a profession) in the genitive case, e.g. Ó Dónaill (literally "descendant of Dónall") and Mac Siúrtáin (literally "son of Jordan"). When Ó is followed by a vowel, a (lowercase) ⟨h⟩ is attached to the vowel, e.g. Ó hUiginn (O'Higgins) or Ó hAodha (Hughes).

A woman's surname replaces Ó with Ní (reduction of Iníon Uí "descendant's daughter") and Mac with Nic (reduction of Iníon Mhic "son's daughter"). In both cases the following name undergoes lenition, except for when Nic is followed by ⟨c⟩ or ⟨g⟩. Thus the daughter of Seán Ó Dónaill has the surname Ní Dhónaill and the daughter of Pól Mac Siúrtáin has the surname Nic Shiúrtáin. In Ulster it is common for a woman who adopts her husband's name to just use Ní or Nic rather than the forms seen below.

If a woman marries a man, she may choose to take his surname. In this case, Ó is replaced by Bean Uí ("descendant's wife") and Mac by Bean Mhic ("son's wife"). In both cases Bean may be omitted, which results in Uí or Mhic. In both cases the following name undergoes lenition, except for when Mhic is followed by ⟨c⟩ or ⟨g⟩. Thus a woman marrying Seán Ó Dónaill may choose to adopt Bean Uí Dhónaill or Uí Dhónaill as her surname and a woman marrying Pól Mac Siúrtáin may choose to adopt Bean Mhic Siúrtáin or Mhic Siúrtáin as her surname.

Mag, Nig, and Mhig are sometimes used instead of Mac, Nic, and Mhic before a vowel or ⟨fh⟩ (which is silent) followed by a vowel.

=== Other surnames ===
Norman surnames formed by de (always lowercase; "of") followed by a name, e.g. de Búrca (Burke), de Paor (Power), or de hÍde (Hide, Hyde).

Some names consist of Mac Giolla ("servant's son") or Ó Maoil ("follower's descendant") followed by a name in the genitive case, e.g. Mac Giolla Phádraig, Ó Maoil Eoin.

Summary of section contents
Irish					Anglicisation	Example
Base	Person	Case		Meaning	Anglicisation	Example
Base	Person	nom.	gen./voc.	Meaning	Anglicisation	Example
Ó	Man	Ó	Uí	descendant	O' or omitted	Pól Ó Murchú
Ó	Wife	[Bean] Uí	Bhean Uí	descendant's [wife]	O' or omitted	Mairéad [Bean] Uí Mhurchú
Ó	Woman	Ní		descendant's daughter	O' or omitted	Gráinne Ní Mhurchú
Mac	Man	Mac	Mhic	son	Mc, Mac, M', Mag, or omitted	Seán Mac Mathúna
Mac	Wife	[Bean] Mhic	Bhean Mhic	son's [wife]	Mc, Mac, M', Mag, or omitted	Máire [Bean] Mhic Mhathúna
Mac	Woman	Nic		son's daughter	Mc, Mac, M', Mag, or omitted	Aoife Nic Mhathúna
Mag	Man	Mag	Mhig	son	Mag, Mc, Mac, M' or omitted	Tomás Mag Uidhir
Mag	Wife	[Bean] Mhig	Bhean Mhig	son's [wife]	Mag, Mc, Mac, M' or omitted	Siobhán [Bean] Mhig Uidhir
Mag	Woman	Nig		son's s daughter	Mag, Mc, Mac, M' or omitted	Róisín Nig Uidhir
de	All	de		of	de, d' or omitted	Séamus de Búrca

== Examples of first names and surnames ==
=== Notable examples of first names and surnames ===
Many Irish people use English (or anglicised) forms of their names in English-language contexts and Irish forms in Irish-language contexts. The Irish names of some people more famous under their English names include:

English/Anglicised name	Irish name	Notes
Thomas Ashe	Tomás Ághas	Gaelic League member
Moya Brennan	Máire Ní Bhraonáin	Irish-language spelling as birth name
Turlough O'Carolan	Toirdhealbhach Ó Cearbhalláin	Irish harpist and composer
Michael Collins	Mícheál Ó Coileáin	signed Anglo-Irish Treaty with Irish-language name
Patrick S. Dinneen	Pádraig Ua Duinnín	was an Irish lexicographer and historian, and a leading figure in the Gaelic revival
Enya (Enya Patricia Brennan)	Eithne Pádraigín Ní Bhraonáin	Irish singer, songwriter and musician
Arthur Griffith	Art Ó Gríobhtha	Gaelic League member; Sinn Féin founder and leader; bilingual signature on Anglo-Irish Treaty
Michael D. Higgins	Micheál Ó hUigínn	9th President of Ireland
Douglas Hyde	Dubhghlas de hÍde	1st President of Ireland; CnaG founder
Mary McAleese	Máire Mhic Ghiolla Íosa	née Mary Leneghan/Máire Ní Lionnacháin
Liam Mellows	Liam Ó Maoilíosa	Irish politician
Kevin O'Higgins	Caoimhín Ó hUiginn	Minister for Justice and Vice-President
Seán T. O'Kelly	Seán T. Ó Ceallaigh	Vice-President, first Tánaiste, President of Ireland
Thomas Francis O'Rahilly	Tomás Phroinsias Ó Rathaille	scholar of Celtic language and culture; sometimes also "Rahilly" or "Rahily"
Patrick Pearse	Pádraig Mac Piarais	CnaG; An Claidheamh Soluis editor; St. Enda's School founder
Joseph Plunkett	Seosamh Máire Pluincéad	Gaelic League member; an Easter Rising leader
Mary Robinson	Máire Bean Mhic Róibín	(née Máire de Búrca)
Gerard Toal	Gearóid Ó Tuathail	

Other people are generally better known by their Irish name than by their English name, including the following:

Irish name	English/Anglicised form	Notes
Dubhaltach Mac Fhirbhisigh	Dudley Forbes	though neither Dubhaltach or Fibrisigh correspond to the Anglicised forms
Ruaidhrí Ó Flaithbheartaigh	Roderick O'Flaherty	
Flaithrí Ó Maolconaire	Florence Conry	(1560–1629, Archbishop of Tuam)
Gráinne Ní Mháille	Grace O'Malley	many other Irish-language and English-language respellings of her name also exist
Seán Bán Breathnach	"White" John Walsh	
Séamus Ó Grianna	James Greene	though Grianna does not correspond etymologically to the English name "Green" or "Greene"
Gráinne Seoige	Grace Joyce	
Eiléan Ní Chuilleanáin	Ellen Cullen	
Antoine Ó Raifteirí	Anthony Raftery	
Proinsias De Rossa	Frank Ross	
Pádraig Harrington	Patrick Harrington	Golfer; three-time major winner
Pádraig Ó Riain	Patrick Ryan	
Pádraig Ó Siochfhradha	Patrick O'Sugrue	
Padraig Ó Síocháin	P. A. Sheehan	
Pádraig Ó Fiannachta	Patrick Finnerty	
Lorcán Ua Tuathail	Laurence O'Toole	
Dara Ó Briain	Darragh O'Brien	
Doireann Ní Bhriain	Doreen O'Brien	
Cathal Brugha	Charles William St. John Burgess	
Éamon de Valera	Edward De Valera	2nd Taoiseach (1937–1948, 1951–1954, 1957–1959); 3rd President (1959–1973)
Mairéad Ní Mhaonaigh	Mairead Mooney	"Margaret", another English equivalent of "Mairéad", is rarely used.

== See also ==
- List of Irish-language given names
- Celtic onomastics
- Place names in Ireland
- Scottish Gaelic name
- Welsh surnames
