= Edward Hyde Clarendon =

Edward Hyde, Earl of Clarendon may refer to:

- Edward Hyde, 1st Earl of Clarendon (1609 – 1674), English statesman, historian, and maternal grandfather of Queen Mary II and Queen Anne
- Edward Hyde, 3rd Earl of Clarendon (1661 – 1723), styled Viscount Cornbury, Governor of New York and New Jersey, perhaps best known for the claims of his cross-dressing

== See also ==
- Edward Hyde (disambiguation)
