= Profiat Duran =

- Born: 1350
- Died: 1415
- Occupations: Astrologer, grammarian, medical doctor, historian, scholar, philosopher

Profiat Duran (c. 1350 – c. 1415) (Hebrew: פרופייט דוראן), full Hebrew name Isaac ben Moses haLevi) was a Jewish apologist/polemicist, philosopher, physician, grammarian, and controversialist in the 14th century. He was later sometimes referred to by the sobriquet Efodi (האפודי) through association with his two grammars entitled Ephod. After being forcibly converted to Christianity in 1391, he also appears in official records under his Converso name Honoratus de Bonafide. After escaping Spain, he returned to practicing Judaism openly and wrote several works including polemics against Christianity and grammar.

== Personal life ==
It is not known whether he was born at Perpignan, where he lived for some years, or in another Catalan town. In his youth he attended a Talmudic school in Germany for a short time, but instead of confining his studies to the Talmud, he took up philosophy and other sciences also, in spite of the interdiction of his teachers. Duran became a tutor in the Crescas family, and during the bloody riots of 1391 was forcibly baptized, becoming an anusim.

After escaping Spain, he returned to practicing Judaism openly, and wrote a number of works including polemics against Christianity and grammar. He appears to have also attempted to reach Palestine, however it is unclear whether he made it. He died in 1414/1415 in Iberia, France, or the East.

== Works ==
=== Al Tehi Ka-Aboteka ("Be Not Like Thy Fathers") ===
Duran is the author of a famous satiric epistle called, after the repeatedly recurring phrase, Al Tehi Ka-Aboteka (Be Not Like Your Fathers). It was written about 1396, and was circulated by Don Meïr Alguades, to whom it had been sent. It is so ingeniously ambiguous that the Christians, who called it Alteca Boteca, interpreted it in their favor; but, as soon as they recognized its satirical import they burned it publicly. This epistle, with a commentary by Joseph ibn Shem-Tov and an introduction by Isaac Akrish, was first printed at Constantinople in 1554, and was republished in A. Geiger's Melo Chofnajim, 1840, in the collection Ḳobeẓ Wikkuḥim, 1844, and in P. Heilpern's Eben Boḥan, part 2, 1846. Geiger also translated most of it into German (Wissenschaftliche Zeitschrift, iv. 451).

According to an account written at the top of one of the manuscripts of the epistle, Duran and his friend David Bonet Bonjourno made up a plan to emigrate to Palestine in order to return to Judaism. The two friends set out on their journey, getting as far as Avignon, where they met up with another converso, Paul of Burgos (who had become a believing Christian priest, and had achieved the rank of Bishop). Paul disrupted their plan by persuading Bonjourno to become a true Christian, and Duran was forced to return to Catalonia. In response to these events, Duran wrote Be Not Like Your Fathers.

Some scholars (Frank Talmage, among others) have dismissed this fanciful account as implausible. However, there is a certain amount of corroborating evidence. The notarial ledgers of Perpignan show several transactions in 1393 and 1394 in which Duran (known officially by his Christian name Honoratus de Bonafe) moved assets across the border to France. Also, Paul of Burgos is documented to have been in Avignon in 1394 for the conclave in which the Antipope Clement VII was elected.

=== Kelimmat ha-Goyim ("Shame of the Gentiles") ===
Connected with this epistle is the polemic Kelimmat ha-Goyim ("Shame of the Gentiles"), a criticism of Christian dogmas, written in 1397 at the request of Don Hasdai Crescas, to whom it was dedicated. In it, Duran states the principle that the most convincing polemical technique is to argue within one's opponents own assumptions. Using the knowledge of Latin he gained from his medical studies and the indoctrination he received as a converso, he identifies what he sees as internal contradictions within the New Testament, and discrepancies between its literal text and church dogma. The work can be seen as a precursor of modern textual criticism. In about 1397 Duran wrote an anti-Christian polemic, Kelimat ha-Goyim (“Shame of the Gentiles”) which some have seen as having discredited the Gospels and other early Christian writings. Although he did not accept the defence used by Nachmanides at the Disputation of Barcelona (1263) of "two Jesuses" in the Talmud. He argued that the old Spanish word for pigs, Marrano [see too: Marranos], was derived from the Hebrew word for conversion, hamarah.

=== Hesheb ha-Efod ("The ephod's girdle") ===
In 1395 Duran compiled an almanac in twenty-nine sections entitled Ḥesheb ha-Efod ("The ephod's girdle"), and dedicated to Moses Zarzal, writer and physician to Henry III of Castile (1379–1406). That Duran was familiar with the philosophy of Aristotle as interpreted by Muslim philosophers, is apparent from his synoptic commentary on Maimonides' The Guide for the Perplexed, which was published at Sabbionetta in 1553, at Jeßnitz in 1742, and at Zhovkva in 1860.

=== Ma'aseh Efod ("The making of the ephod") ===
Duran's chief work, praised by both Christians and Jews, is his philosophical and critical Hebrew grammar, Ma'aseh Efod ("The making of the ephod"), containing an introduction and thirty-three chapters, and finished in 1403. He wrote it not only to instruct his contemporaries, who either knew nothing about grammar or had erroneous notions concerning it, but especially to refute mistakes promulgated by the later grammarians. He frequently cites the otherwise unknown Samuel Benveniste as an eminent grammarian. See the edition of J. Friedländer and J. Kohn (Vienna, 1865). In 1393 Duran wrote a dirge on Abraham ben Isaac ha-Levi of Gerona, probably a relative; three letters containing responsa, to his pupil Meïr Crescas; and two exegetical treatises on several chapters of II Samuel, all of which have been edited as an appendix to the Ma'aseh Efod.

In the introduction, he discusses music, contrasting two varieties, cantillation (ta'amei ha-miqra) and post-Biblical hymns (piyyutim). He states that while the latter appeals to the senses, the former appeals to the mind. He prefers cantillation, following his belief that the Torah is perfect, and uses it for both liturgical reading and study.

=== Other works, lost works ===
At the request of some members of the Benveniste family, Duran wrote an explanation of a religious festival poem by Abraham ibn Ezra (printed in the collection Ta'am Zeḳenim of Eliezer Ashkenazi), as well as the solution of Ibn Ezra's well-known riddle on the quiescent letters of the Hebrew alphabet (quoted by Immanuel Benvenuto in his grammar Liwyat Ḥen, Mantua, 1557, without mentioning Duran), and several explanations relating to Ibn Ezra's commentary on the Pentateuch.

Duran was also a historian. In a lost work entitled Zikron ha-Shemadot he gave the history of Jewish martyrs since the destruction of the Temple. Heinrich Graetz has shown that this work was used by Solomon Usque and Judah ibn Verga.

Duran also wrote additions to Abraham Farissol's sefer Magen Avraham, which is a book that documents famous debates between Christians and Jews, the purpose of the book to illegitimate christianity and protect Jews from conversion. The additions Duran wrote were called Keshet U-Magenm.
