= Henry Hyde (disambiguation) =

Henry Hyde (1924–2007) was an American politician.

Henry Hyde may also refer to:

- Henry Hyde (died 1634) (1563–1634), English politician and lawyer
- Henry Hyde (Royalist) (c. 1605–1650), Royalist executed by Parliament in 1650
- Henry Hyde, 2nd Earl of Clarendon (1638–1709), English aristocrat and politician
- Henry Hyde, 4th Earl of Clarendon (1672–1753), English nobleman and politician
- Henry Hyde, Viscount Cornbury (1710–1753), British author and politician
- Henry Baldwin Hyde (1834–1899), founder of an insurance company
- Henry J. Hyde (Medal of Honor) (1846–1893), Medal of Honor recipient during the Indian Wars
- Henry Hyde (priest) (1854–1932), Archdeacon of Madras
- Henry van Zile Hyde (1906–1982), American physician and public health official

== See also ==
- Harry Hyde (1925–1996), NASCAR crew chief
