= Hyde-White =

Hyde-White is a surname. Notable people with the surname include:

- Alex Hyde-White (born 1959), British-born American actor
- Wilfrid Hyde-White (1903–1991), English actor

== See also ==
- Hyde (surname)
- White (surname)
