= Solomon Klein =

French rabbi

Personal life
- Born: October 14, 1814 Bischheim, Alsace, France
- Died: November 10, 1867 (aged 53) Colmar, Alsace, France

Religious life
- Religion: Judaism

Solomon Klein (October 14, 1814 – November 10, 1867), was a French rabbi.

Klein was successively district rabbi at Bischheim (1839–41), Durmenach (1841–48), and Rixheim (1848–50). From 1850 to 1867 he was grand rabbi at Colmar, which rabbinate had been occupied by Hirsch Katzenellenbogen, Simon Cahn, and Seligmann Goudchaux.

Klein was the author of the following works:

- "Nouvelle Grammaire Hébraïque Raisonnée et Comparée," Durmenach, 1846
- "Traduction Française et Annotation du Sefer Yesodot ha-Maskil de R. David ben Bilia du Portugal, XIVe Siècle," in the "Dibre Ḥakamim" of Eliezer Ashkenazi, Metz, 1849
- "Notions Elémentaires de la Grammaire Hébraïque"
- "Guide du Traducteur du Pentateuque," 1851
- rules for the Ḥazzan and for the Shoḥeṭ, in Hebrew and German, 1855
- "Le Judaïsme ou la Vérité sur le Talmud" (German transl. by Mannheimer), Mülhansen, 1859
- "M. Philippson et Sa Traduction de la Bible," in "Univ. Isr." 1860
- "Recueil de Lettres Pastorales et de Discours d'Inauguration," Colmar, 1863
- "Cours de Thèmes et de Versions Hébraïques à l'Usage des Commençants," Mülhausen, 1866; "La Justice Criminelle chez les Hébreux," published posthumously in "Arch. Isr." 1898.
