= James Hyde =

James Hyde may refer to:

- James Hyde (activist) (died 2018), Australian LGBT health and rights advocate, usually known as Jim Hyde
- James Hyde (actor) (born 1962), American actor
- James Hyde (artist) (born 1958), American painter, sculptor and photographer
- James Franklin Hyde (1903–1999), American chemist
- James F. C. Hyde (1825–1898), American politician from Massachusetts
- James Hazen Hyde (1876–1959), American businessman
- James M. Hyde (1873–1943), American metallurgist
- James S. Hyde (born 1932), American biophysicist
