= Coan ki =

Chinese board game

Çoan ki
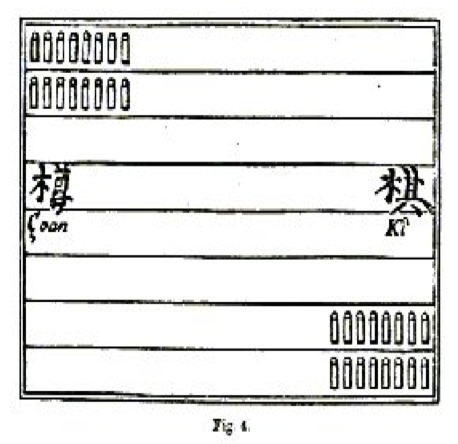
- Thomas Hyde's illustration of the game Coan Ki, from De Ludus Orientalibris (1694)
- Genres: Board game, dice game, race game
- Players: 2
- Chance: Medium

Çoan ki (Chinese: 樽棋; pinyin: zunqi; Wade–Giles: tsun k'i, also erectus ludus or "The Bottle Game") is a Chinese board game similar to western tables games. It was first described in 1694 by Dr. Thomas Hyde in De Ludis Orientalibus Libri Duo.

== Gameplay ==
On a board divided transversely into eight fields, players take turns to move their sixteen bottle- or vase-shaped pieces around the board according to the roll of two dice. The aim of the game is to get all of a player's pieces to make one full circuit around the board and return them to their starting position.

Dice rolls can be divided between pieces as follows: either one piece moves the total value of the throw, or two pieces move the values shown on each individual die. If a double is thrown, the player may move two pieces the total value of the throw or one piece half the value (such that if a double five is rolled, two pieces may each move ten spaces or one piece may move five spaces). If the two dice show consecutive numbers, the player may move one piece the full value of the throw and one piece the lower value, or he may move one piece the full value and another piece the full value minus one (e.g. a throw of two and three would allow either one piece to move two spaces and another five, or one piece to move five spaces and another four). A player must use the full roll of the dice; if he cannot do so, he loses his turn.

By stationing eight pieces in the same field of the board, a player can create a block, which cannot be passed by the other player. Blocks cannot be created on either of the starting fields.

Players must enter a stake before the game begins. If at any time a player rolls double-one on the dice, he loses a piece and must stake an additional fine worth 10% of the total value of the pot. Under some rule codes, it is possible to avoid losing a piece by paying a larger fine. The winner of the game takes the pot.
