= Kimchi (disambiguation) =

Kimchi is a Korean side dish made from pickled vegetables.

Kimchi may also refer to:

- Kimhi or Kimchi, surname
- Kimchi (software), a web management tool to manage KVM infrastructure
- Kim Chi (drag queen) (b. 1987), a contestant on RuPaul's Drag Race (season 8)
- Kimchi, an ethnic slur used for a Korean

== See also ==
- Kim Chiu, Filipina-Chinese actress and singer
- Steve Lombardi, professional wrestler who worked for a while under the name Kim Chee
