= Jacob Provençal =

Jacob ben David Provençal (Jacob Provenzali) was a 15th-century rabbi and Talmudist from Marseille, where he was in maritime trade, and later moved to Naples and is recorded there as a rabbi in 1480. He is known for a 1490 letter to David Messer Leon in which he defended the value of secular sciences, Be-Debar Limmud ha-Ḥokmah, which was later cited and published in an anthology by Eliezer ben Solomon Ashkenazi. In this letter he defends the compatibility of medicine, astrology, alchemy, agriculture, and metalwork with Judaism and the study of Torah, while he is negative on Aristotelianism. He also wrote a letter of approbation for Jacob Landau's Sefer Agur, which appears in the 1526 edition. His commentary on Song of Songs was published in 1577. Isaac Akrish annotated and corrected what is probably Jacob Provençal's Song of Songs commentary.

== Jewish Encyclopedia/Encyclopedia Judaica bibliographies ==
- Eliakim Carmoly, Hist. des Médecins Juifs, p. 125;
- Henri Gross, Gallia Judaica, p. 383.
- Ghirondi-Neppi, 215;
- Moses Shulvass, Chayyei ha-Yehudim be-Italyah bi-Tekufat ha-Renaissance (1955), 75, 142, 238;
- Cecil Roth, Jews in the Renaissance (1959), 43n.
