= Joseph Ibn Kaspi =

French Medieval Torah scholar and Biblical commentator

Joseph ben Abba Meir ben Joseph ben Jacob Ibn Kaspi, also known as Yosef Caspi (1280 Arles – 1345 Mallorca), was a Provençal exegete, grammarian, and philosopher, apparently influenced by Averroës.

== Biography ==
His family hailed from Largentière, from whence his Hebrew surname "Caspi" (made of silver) derived. His Provençal name was Don Bonafous de Largentera, or in French En Bonafoux de L'Argentière. He traveled much, visiting Arles, Tarascon, Aragon, Catalonia, Mallorca (where he must have foregathered with Judah Leon ben Moses Mosconi), and Egypt, where, as he says in his Tzava'ah (ethical will), he hoped to be instructed by the members of Maimonides' family. This hope was not realized, as the descendants of Maimonides were more pious than learned. At one time Caspi intended to go to Fez, where many renowned schools existed; but he seems to have abandoned this project and to have settled at Tarascon. He underwent much suffering at the time of the Pastoureaux persecution, and was threatened with punishment if he did not renounce his faith.

He held the position that knowledge of the future, even by the prophets and by God, was probabilistic knowledge only.

== Works ==
Caspi was one of the most prolific writers of his time, being the author of 29 works, the greater part of which are still extant in manuscript and the titles of the remainder being known from the list which he had the precaution to make. He began his literary career at the age of seventeen. At thirty he devoted himself to the study of logic and philosophy, which he eagerly cultivated until his death. The following is a list of his writings in their chronological order, some of them being no longer in existence:

- Perush, commentary on ibn Janah's grammatical work
- Supercommentaries on Abraham ibn Ezra's commentary on the Pentateuch. (One of these commentaries is purely grammatical, bearing the title "Porashat Kesef" (Sum of Money), and is still extant in manuscript (Bibliothèque Nationale, Paris, MS. No. 184, and elsewhere)
- Terumat Kesef (Oblation of Silver), summary of Averroes's commentaries on Aristotle's Ethics and Plato's Republic, according to the Hebrew translation of Samuel of Marseilles (Parma MS. No. 442; Neubauer, "Cat. Bodl. Hebr. MSS." No. 1427)
- Tzawwa'at Kaspi (Testament of Caspi), or Yoreh De'ah, moral sentences dedicated to the author's son, and published by Eliezer Ashkenazi, Leipzig, 1844
- Mattot Kesef (Staves of Silver), commentaries on the Bible, with the exception of the Pentateuch
- Matzref le-Kesef (Crucible for Silver), commentary on the Bible
- Kefore Kesef (Cups of Silver), giving the author's reasons for the rejection of various explanations of Ibn Ezra and Maimonides
- Kesef Siggim (Silver Dross), questions and answers on the seeming contradictions in the Bible
- Tzeror ha-Kesef (Bundle of Silver), or Qitztzur Higgayon, a compendium of logic (Bibliothèque Nationale, Paris, MS. No. 986)
- Retuqot Kesef (Chains of Silver), or Pirqe Yosef (Chapters of Joseph), treatise on grammar
- Shulchan Kesef (Table of Silver), divided into four chapters called "regel" (foot), treating of prophets and miracles ("Cat. Peyron," p. 209)
- Tirat Kesef (Palace of Silver), or Sefer ha-Sod (Book of Mystery), mystic commentary on the Pentateuch (Vatican MSS. Nos. 36, 46)
- Adne Kesef (Thresholds of Silver), forming the second part of the preceding work and containing mystical explanations of the Biblical books other than the Pentateuch
- Mizreqe Kesef (Basins of Silver), explanations of Biblical passages respecting the creation
- Mazmerot Kesef (Sickles of Silver), commentary on Job (Munich MS. No. 265)
- Menorat Kesef (Candelabra of Silver), commentary on the Merkabah (Heavenly Chariot) (Neubauer, "Cat. Bodl. Hebr. MSS." No. 1631)
- Chagorat Kesef (Girdle of Silver), commentary on Ezra and Chronicles (ibid. No. 362)
- Kappot Kesef (Spoons of Silver), commentary on Ruth and Lamentations (Munich MS. No. 265; Cambridge MS. No. 64)
- Gelile Kesef (Scrolls of Silver), commentary on Esther (Bibliothèque Nationale, Paris, MS. No. 1092; Munich MS. No. 2653)
- Chatzotzerot Kesef (Trumpets of Silver), commentaries on Proverbs, Ecclesiastes, and Song of Songs (Neubauer, "Cat. Bodl. Hebr. MSS." Nos. 362, 1349; Parma MS. No. 461)
- Qa'arot Kesef (Bowls of Silver), in which Caspi endeavored to prove that the Law contains the idea of spiritual happiness and immortality, to explain the Biblical doctrine that God visits the iniquities of the fathers upon the children, and to explain the relation of wickedness to prosperity
- 'Ammude Kesef (Pillars of Silver) and Maskiyyot Kesef (Images of Silver), commentaries on Maimonides' Guide of the Perplexed, published by Werbluner, with notes and corrections by R. Kirchheim, Frankfort-on-the-Main, 1848
- Sharsherot Kesef (Chains of Silver), or Sefer ha-Shorashim (Book of Roots), on Biblical lexicography (Bibliothèque Nationale, Paris, MS. No. 1244)
- Kappot Kesef (Spoons of Silver), in which Caspi explains some Biblical problems concerning the history of the Jews
- Mezamrot Kesef (Songs of Silver; in other lists, Shulchan Kesef), a commentary on the Psalms
- Tam ha-Kesef (The Silver Is Finished), on the destruction of both temples, Jeremiah's prophecies, and the arrival of the Messiah
- Qebutzat Kesef (Collection of Silver), containing a list of Caspi's works, published by Isaac ben Jacob Benjacob in the Debarim 'Attiqim, Leipzig, 1844
- Gebi'a Kesef (Mug of Silver), or Yoreh De'ah (Teacher of Science), supplement to the mystical commentaries on the Bible ("Cat. Peyron." p. 208; Munich MS. No. 265). The initial chapters may have been written as refutation of the apostate Abner of Burgos (Herring 1982). Kaspi finds great theological significance in the number 3 (Chap.V), and he speaks in this work about the origins of the concept of The Trinity found in Christian philosophy, attributing it to an earlier ternary division made among the Separate Intelligences by Aristotelian thinkers (e.g., Abu-Nasr). He also expounds the different philosophical implications of the diverse names of God in the Bible.

Joseph Caspi's name is also to be found attached to many liturgic poems of merit. These, however, may belong to his namesake, Joseph Caspi ben Shalom of the sixteenth century, a liturgic poet of some importance.

Caspi's works were diversely estimated. Ibn Tzartzah, Moses of Narbonne, and Efodi speak in praise of them. The kabbalist Johanan Aleman recommends Caspi's commentaries on account of their mystic character. On the other hand, Isaac Abrabanel and Simon Duran emphatically declare him to be antireligious because, among other things, in his commentary on the Guide for the Perplexed he admitted the eternity of the universe (i. 9, 70; ii. 26).
