= Moses Zarzal =

Moses Zarzal (fl. 1400) was a converso Spanish Jewish writer and physician to Henry III of Castile. He was the dedicatee of Profiat Duran's Hebrew almanac The girdle of the Ephod (1395). Poems in Castilian were attributed to him, including one for the birth of Henry's son, later John II of Castile, though his authorship is not certain.
