= Aaron ben Gershon abu al-Rabi =

Sicilian-Jewish cabalist, and astrologer

Aaron ben Gershon Abu Al-Rabi of Catania (also Aaron ben Gershon Abualrabi, Aaron Alrabi; Italian: Aronne Abulrabi) was a Sicilian-Jewish scholar, cabalist, and astrologer of the 15th century.

== Life ==
He was a son-in-law of Don Moses Gabbai, an exile from Mallorca. Aaron was the youngest of five brothers, all rabbinic scholars; the others were Shallum, Baruch, Moses, and Isaac. He studied in Treviso, Italy, and was familiar with the scientific and philosophic literature of his age; he was a good grammarian, and well acquainted with the Arabic language. Like his father, he believed in astrology, and loved to observe the horoscope. He was also an adept in the Cabala, though at times his critical spirit came in conflict with its doctrines. On his travels he visited Turkey, Egypt, Palestine, Damascus, and Kaffa in the Crimea. In Jerusalem he had many disputations with the Karaites, to which his commentary on the Pentateuch refers with evident pride, as having vindicated the cause of rabbinical theology. While in Rome he was admitted to the presence of Pope Martin V, who was surrounded by his cardinals. Martin V was kindly disposed toward the Jews, and often discussed religious questions with them in a friendly manner. On this occasion he propounded to Aaron a number of very pointed questions concerning Biblical and Talmudical passages. Among other things he asked if the use of the cherubim in the Holy of Holies was not rather antagonistic to the Second Commandment, which prohibits idolatry. Aaron in his commentary refers several times to this discussion and to the answers he gave.

== Writer ==
Coming often in contact with learned Christians, Aaron had many occasions to defend Judaism against the polemics of the Church, on the one hand, and the attacks of the Karaites on the other. It was this unceasing conflict that induced him to write a book, called "Maṭṭeh Aharon" (The Staff of Aaron), in defense of the Law and tradition. Keenly observant, and of an independent and critical spirit, he judged persons and opinions freely and openly. He excels as a writer and as a Bible commentator, and often upbraids the Jews of his native land for their ignorance and hollow pretensions, at the same time pointing with admiration to the numerous Jews of high breeding he has met on his travels. Following the principle of a rational Biblical exegesis, he does not hesitate occasionally to refute haggadic traditions which seem to conflict with reason and common sense; and at times, like Abraham ibn Ezra and Samuel ben Meir, he even states his disagreement with halakic interpretation. He was fully conversant with the views of the Karaites and Samaritans and eager, in his explanation of the Bible, to refute now Christian and now Muslim doctrines. He boldly exposes errors wherever he finds them, claiming "that it is more honorable for the wise to commit an error than knowingly to misrepresent the truth."

Nor does he shrink from pointing out the blemishes he finds in the character of the Patriarchs. Being guided solely by a love of truth, he, as a matter of course, does not spare such great Bible commentators as Rashi and Nahmanides. For the former Aaron entertained a very high regard; of the latter he frequently says, "With due deference to his honor, he misunderstood the Talmud" (see his commentary upon Gen. xxvii. 22; Ex. xxiii. 11, xxv. 9). Like Samuel ben Meir and Maimonides, he explains the law, "Thou shalt not seethe a kid in its mother's milk" (Ex. xxiii. 19), as a warning against a certain idolatrous practise. Notwithstanding his liberal mind and his keen investigating spirit, he was held in high esteem by his contemporaries, as may be seen from David Abi Zimra's mention of him as "Aaron our Rabbi" in No. 10 of his responsa, where he commends him for his liberty of thought. He was a devoted Jew, who deeply deplored the political and social condition of the Jews of his time, and all the more fervently gave expression to his hope for the speedy advent of the Messiah. For his cabalistic views he quotes Recanate and Joseph Sar Shalom, but not the Zohar.

== Works ==
Aaron states that he wrote a Hebrew grammar entitled "Ha-Meyasher" (The Leveler of the Road); "Maṭṭeh Aharon," referred to above, a cabalistic or metaphysical work; "Nezer ha-Ḳodesh" (The Crown of Holiness); "Peraḥ ha-Elohut" (The Blossoming of the Godhead), probably of a similar character, and "Sefer ha-Nefesh" (The Book of the Soul). All of these works are known only through his own quotations in his supercommentary on Rashi. This work, published from an incomplete manuscript, together with another supercommentary on Rashi by Samuel Almosnino, by Moses Albelda, and by Jacob Canizal, is one of the earliest books printed at Constantinople, and is therefore very rare. According to his own testimony, it was written in 1420 (as Perles has shown); but he intended to compose, or, as Perles thinks, actually did compose, a larger commentary on the Pentateuch. Perles has furnished ample proof that Aaron Aldabi—or, as he called himself, Aaron Alrabi—was a man of great originality and merit, and it is to be hoped that his lost works will be discovered, and that editions of his commentary, based on clear manuscripts existing in Oxford and elsewhere, will fully vindicate his character, though Graetz and Karpeles, in their histories, have attacked him.

J. H. Schorr, in "Zion," 1840, first called attention to Abu al-Rabi, erroneously calling him Aaron ben Mose Alrabi; but, owing to a misunderstanding of his remarks, he ascribes to him the strange assertion that Moses translated the Pentateuch from the Arabic into Hebrew—a misunderstanding repeated by Grätz, "Gesch. d. Juden" (third edition), viii. 250, and by Karpeles, "Gesch. der Jüdischen Literatur," p. 771—whereas the author, in his commentary upon Gen. xviii. 5, referring to the rabbinical Haggadah that the angels who came to Abraham appeared as Arabs, says that they spoke in Arabic, and that Moses rendered their words in Hebrew—a remark which he repeats in his comments upon Gen. xxiv. 23 and Ex. ii. 10. Zunz, "Z. G.," pp. 518–520, and Steinschneider, "Cat. Bodl.," call him Alrabi. Aaron's true name, however, is given in the acrostic written by him at the end of his published commentary.
