= David ben Yom Tov =

David ben Yom Tov, also David Bonjorn del Barri, was a Catalan Jewish astronomer and astrologer who lived in the first half of the fourteenth century. He is reported to have been born at Cotlliure in Catalonia in around 1300, and to have died in Barcelona, probably before 1361.

In the past some scholars, including the nineteenth century scholar Moritz Steinschneider, have identified ben Yom Tov with the Portuguese Jewish scholar David ben Yom Tov ibn Bilia; this is now considered unlikely. Yom Tov is Hebrew for Good Day, Bonjorn in Catalan.

== Life ==
Sobrequés estimates that David ben Yom Tov was born at Cotlliure in about 1300. He was also called David Bonjorn, Bonjorn being a literal Catalan translation of the Hebrew Yom Tov, i.e. "good day".

His father was Bonjorn del Barri, a wealthy merchant of the province of Roussillon just north of the Pyrenees, which at that time was part of the Catalan Kingdom of Majorca. In 1323 del Barri is recorded as having been granted permission by King Sancho of Majorca to join the council of the Jewish community of Perpignan; and to travel and trade freely throughout the country, without having to wear a yellow badge or any other symbol to mark him out as a Jew. However by 1327 del Barri was dead, and David Bonjorn appears successfully petitioning James II of Aragon to relax various provisions of his father's will, including requirements on him to move from Cotlliure and reside in Perpignan for two years; to lend no money to the new king of Majorca or his courtiers until the king's twentieth birthday; nor to provide guarantees for anyone, apart from his own sisters; nor to take a lease on any royal incomes. Bonjorn appears to have been the only male heir; but his sisters mentioned in the document include one called Venges, who went on to become the wife of the celebrated Jewish author Joseph Caspi.

Ben Yom Tov himself had first married a Jewish woman from the town of Arles, in Provence. The marriage was dissolved without being consummated, because the wife was declared mad.

In 1332 Alfonso IV of Aragon granted permission for a new marriage to Esther, the daughter of Astruc Caravita, a wealthy merchant of Girona. The marriage was turbulent however, and by 1337 Esther was demanding divorce, and the return of her dowry to her family. David refused to consider it, until Esther had all his books and instruments removed from his study and hidden. "So dear were they to my eyes, that she could hardly have forced me and obligated me with any other kind of coercion better than my interest, desire and longing for them," David complained. He duly presented the required statement of renunciation before the Jewish Beth Din at Perpignan; but then sought to cancel various clauses of the court's decision, presumably those relating to the dowry. David called in legal experts from the king of Majorca to try to sway the court; in response the authorities of Esther's home town, Girona, weighed in on her side. A long and noisy debate ensued, as rabbis from both sides of the Pyrenees came forward to have their say. Several documented reviews of the case survive; but eventually the original decision was upheld.

Documents place David as still living in Perpignan in 1340; and again in 1352, when the king of Aragon, Peter IV, sent him a terse message to chase up some "astrolabe tables", complaining about their late delivery.

The Jewish scholar and traveller Judah Mosconi reports meeting two wise men, "David Bonjorn and his father" in Perpignan, at a date which has been estimated as 1362. He describes David Bonjorn as one of the greatest astronomers of that time. It has been conjectured that this account represents a slip of the pen, and should read "David Bonjorn and his son". David Bonjorn's son Jacob ben David Poel ben Yom Tov was indeed also a noted astronomer, who prepared a much copied set of astronomical tables at Perpignan in 1361 that were translated and re-translated. The conjecture is not certain however: Jacob himself had a son David, that Mosconi might have been referring to; although if the date of 1362 is correct he would have been at most only a boy, not a famous astronomer. The suggestion has also been made that since it was Jacob, rather than David, whose name was attached to the tables in 1361, then this could be a sign that David was already dead.

== Astrology and medicine ==
One work of David ben Yom Tov that survives is the Kelal Qatan ("Concise summary", or in Latin Compendio breve), a short summary of the application of astrology to medicine, based primarily on the astrological position of the moon, running to eleven pages in a modern English translation. Five surviving manuscripts are known: four in Hebrew from the fifteenth century, and one in Latin translation written in Catalonia before 1446.

According to the author, the book was composed at the request of a "distinguished friend", "one of the medical experts of our time", to be a "concise summary of astrology which a physician needs every day for the administration of purgatives, potions, and vomitives" (§8).

A knowledge of astrology, he writes, is part of what a complete doctor should know, so he can allow for the effects of the heavenly bodies in diagnosis and prognosis; while a knowledge of medicine is part of what a complete astrologer should know, so he can best prepare his subject for the influence of external forces, or best repel them. But, the writer adds, in the words of Hippocrates, that art is long, but life is short; it is "better for every human being to be the master of one science, than to know a little bit of this and a little bit of that", so thus the request from his friend the distinguished practitioner for a brief summary. He had not wanted to turn his friend down, and damage his own reputation, so compiled the summary to the best of his ability, "from the books composed on the subject", without adding anything of his own (§§ 2–10).

The author then goes on to give a brief glossary of astrological and astronomical terms, before outlining various rules for good and bad times for particular medical interventions, such as blood-lettings, purgatives and emetics; astrological indications for "critical days" in the course of an illness; and even an astrological indication that the patient would best benefit by choosing another physician. But such indications can only be general, he concludes; the patient is also subject to influences such as their birth horoscopes, and of course ultimately to the will of God.

Of the unnamed "books on the subject" claimed by David ben Yom Tov for his sources, the recent academic editors of Kelal Qatan identify several passages that show a clear debt to the Centiloquium then ascribed to Ptolemy, whom the author acknowledges by name, and the commentary on it by Ahmad ibn Yusuf al-Misri (d. 912); and also the Sefer ha-Me'orot (1148), a work specifically on medical astrology by the celebrated Jewish scholar Abraham ibn Ezra, whom the author also acknowledges at one point.

The overall theoretical framework described by ben Yom Tov is very much in line with these two sources. The composition itself appears to be novel however, and most of the specific rules that he adduces appear to follow no direct extant known antecedent; though the majority may, as he appears to suggest at §17, merely be worked-through consequences of associations implicit in the summary tables of standard astrological properties that he says can be found at the back of astronomical almanacs. A copy of such a set of tables of astrological properties, that ben Yom Tov says (§18) he will provide with the work, survive in the back of the Latin manuscript from Barcelona, and do indeed parallel tables of astrological properties that have been found appended to a later copy of astronomical tables by Abraham bar Hiyya (d. 1145), the table of astrological properties closely corresponding to a summary of information from Ibn Ezra's general introduction to practical astrology, Reshit Hokhmah ("The Beginning of Wisdom").

According to the editors, astrology at most only ever had a marginal role in Jewish medical practice at the time; but they see David ben Yom Tob's Kelal Qatan as part of an uptick of interest in the subject in Catalonia and Southern France in the 14th century, which can be detected also in Hebrew works by Shem Tov ben Isaac of Tortosa and Pinchas of Narbonne, and Latin works by Bartholomew of Bruges, Bernard de Gordon and Arnau of Villanova.

== Bibliography ==
- Gerrit Bos, Charles Burnett, and Tzvi Langermann (2005), "Hebrew Medical Astrology: David Ben Yom Tov, Kelal Qaṭan: Original Hebrew Text, Medieval Latin Translation, Modern English Translation", Transactions of the American Philosophical Society (New Series) 95 (5); 121 pp. JSTOR 20020391 review review 2
- Josep Chabas i Bergon, Antoni Roca i Rossell, and Xavier Rodriguez i Gil (1992), L'astronomia de Jacob ben David Bonjorn. Barcelona: Institut d'estudis catalans. ISBN 84-7283-216-3, pp. 39–42 (in Catalan)
- Santiago Sobrequés i Vidal (1975), Societat i estructura política de la Girona medieval. Barcelona: Curial. ISBN 84-7256-061-9, pp. 163–6. (in Catalan)
