= David Kamhi =

Bosnian violinist (1936–2021)

Personal life
- Born: 8 October 1936 Sarajevo
- Died: 12 March 2021 (aged 84) Sarajevo
- Resting place: Bare cemetery
- Home town: Sarajevo

Religious life
- Religion: Judaism

Senior posting
- Previous post: Sarajevo hazzan

David Kamhi (8 October 1936 — 12 March 2021) was a Bosnian Jewish theologian, hazzan and violinist.

== Biography ==
David Kamhi was born on 8 October 1936 in Sarajevo. In his hometown, he graduated from the First Boys' Gymnasium, then the Secondary School of Music, and graduated and received his master's degree from the Music Academy in Sarajevo. He spent several years at the Tchaikovsky Moscow State Conservatory, and in Rome at the Santa Cecilia Academy of Music. He was a professor of violin, viola and methodology at the Music Academy in Sarajevo. Had solo concerts in Bosnia and Herzegovina, the Former Yugoslav region and Europe. For twenty years, he was the president of the Association of Music Artists of Bosnia and Herzegovina. In the period 1993–1995, he was a member of the Council of the Presidency of Bosnia and Herzegovina for foreign affairs, and an adviser at the Embassy of Bosnia and Herzegovina in Spain in 1995 and 1996. In the period from 1992 to 1997, he was the vice-president of the Jewish cultural and humanitarian society La Benevolencija, of the Jewish Municipality of Sarajevo, and the editor-in-chief of the newsletter Bilten. From 1992 to October 2016, he was the hazzan of the Sarajevo Synagogue.

He died in Sarajevo on 12 March 2021, at the age of 84.
