= Henry Hyde (priest) =

Archdeacon of Madras (1904–1910)

Henry Barry Hyde (31 May 1854 – 12 April 1932) was an Anglican archdeacon in India in the early 20th century.

Elwes was educated at the Royal Institution School in Liverpool; King's College, London; and University College, Durham. After a curacy in Ashford, Kent, he was a private secretary to Joseph Lightfoot, Bishop of Durham. In 1887 he went out with the Bengal Ecclesiastical Department to India. In 1899 he transferred to Madras, where he was Archdeacon from 1904 to 1910.
