= Solomon Kimhi =

Solomon Kimhi was a Turkish rabbinical author who lived at Constantinople in the middle of the nineteenth century. In 1862 he published Meleket Shelomoh, in which he tried to prove that the Karaites are animals, that it is forbidden to teach them the Law, and that it is permitted to kill them. When the Karaites protested, the chief rabbi of Constantinople commanded that all the copies of the work which could be found should be burned. Kimhi wrote two other works: Yahel Shelomoh (Smyrna, 1870) and Yeme Shelomoh (Salonica, 1874).
