= Chananya Yom Tov Lipa =

Chananya Yom Tov Lipa is a Jewish given name, and may refer to:

- Rabbi Chananya Yom Tov Lipa Teitelbaum, leader in the Satmar Hasidic dynasty
- Rabbi Chananya Yom Tov Lipa Goldman, a renowned Orthodox rabbi
