= Joseph ibn Shem-Tov =

Judæo-Spanish writer

To be distinguished from Joseph Albo (1380-1435)

Joseph ben Shem-Tov ibn Shem-Tov (died 1480) was a prolific Judæo-Spanish writer born in Castile. He lived in various cities of Spain: Medina del Campo de León (1441); Alcalá de Henares (1451); and Segovia (1454).

He held a position at court which brought him in contact with Christian scholars. According to the custom of the time. In the preface to his commentary on Profiat Duran's Al-Tehi ka-Aboteka, he recounts a disputation with a Christian scholar concerning the doctrine of the Trinity. In 1452 he was sent by the Prince of Asturia, Don Enrique, to Segovia to prevent an outbreak of popular rage against the Jews at Easter. He speaks occasionally in his writings of great sufferings which drove him from place to place, and of passing through a severe illness. Graetz (Gesch. viii. 422) said, based a quotation in Joseph Jaabez's Or ha-Ḥayyim, that Ibn Shem-Ṭob died a martyr. He died in 1480.

Ibn Shem-Ṭob's numerous writings, a list of which was compiled by Munk and supplemented by Beer and Steinschneider, are divisible into (a) independent works and (b) commentaries.

== Original works ==
- Hanhagat ha-Bayit, treatise on economics, written in his youth (see his En ha-Ḳore); nothing further is known concerning it. According to Steinschneider, it may be a revision of Aristotle's Economics.
- En ha-Ḳore, the only medieval scientific Hebrew homiletical work extant. The book is very rich in quotations from both Christian and Islamic authors. It treats systematically of the science of homiletics, defines the limitations of exegesis, and expresses itself in regard to the fundamental aim of Jewish preaching. It contains frequent references to Aristotle's Ethics, Ibn Shem-Ṭob's favorite work.
- Kebod Elohim, on the summum bonum and the aim of life; written in 1442, printed at Ferrara in 1555.
- Da'at 'Elyon, a refutation of a fatalistic writing of the baptized Jew Abner of Burgos (Wolf, Bibl. Hebr. iii.428; the Oppenheim MS. cited by Wolf is no longer to be found in the collection at Oxford).

== Commentaries ==
- Commentary on Jedaiah ha-Penini's Beḥinat 'Olam.
- Commentary on his father's Sefer ha-Yesodot, known only through a citation in En ha-Ḳore. Just as Sefer ha-Yesodot is, probably, only another title of his father's Sefer ha-Emunot, so is this commentary, according to Steinschneider, probably identical with the Sefer Kebod Elohim.
- Commentary on the anti-Christian letter of Profiat Duran, Al-Tehi ka-Aboteka, edited and printed together for the first time at Constantinople, 1577; reprinted, by A. Geiger in Ḳobez Wikkuḥim, Breslau, 1844.
- Biṭṭul 'Iḳḳere ha-Noẓerim, a Hebrew translation of and commentary on Hasdai Crescas' refutation, in Spanish, of the chief dogmas of Christianity. It was written at Alcala di Henares in 1451, and published anonymously at Salonica (?) in 1860. The original work by Crescas and its title have been lost (Steinschneider, Hebr. Uebers. p. 462). These last two commentaries were in accord with the anti-Christian polemical spirit prevailing in the Jewish religio-philosophic literature of the time.
- Commentary on Lamentations, written at Medina del Campo in 1441, after the author had recovered from an illness (Parma, De Rossi MSS. No. 177).
- Commentary on the Isagoge of Porphyry, after Averroes, of which no manuscript has yet been found (see Steinschneider, Cat. der Hebr. Handschriften in der Stadtbibliothek zu Hamburg, p. 106; idem, Hebr. Uebers. p. 86).
- Commentary on Averroes' treatise on the possibility of union with the active intellect (Sekel ha-Po'el), after Moses Narboni's translation, with a long introduction (Steinschneider, Cat. der Hebr. Handschriften Berlin, No. 216; Zotenberg, l.c. No. 885). Ibn Shem-Ṭob made a short extract from this voluminous commentary, which he finished at Segovia in 1454 (Neubauer, Cat. Bodl. Hebr. MSS. No. 1253; see Steinschneider in Monatsschrift, xxxii. 459 et seq.; idem, Hebr. Uebers. pp. 194 et seq.).
- Commentary on part of Averroes' "large commentary" on the De Anima of Aristotle, cited in Ibn Shem-Ṭob's commentary on Aristotle's Ethics (Steinschneider, l.c. p. 150).
- Short commentary on Maimonides' Moreh, ii.68, cited in his son's commentary on the same work. Nothing further concerning it is known.
- Commentary on the Sidra Bereshit, cited by him in the En ha-Ḳore, and a commentary on Deut. xv. 11, cited in his commentary on the Nicomachcan Ethics (according to Steinschneider these two may be only sermons).
- Commentary, containing minute and diffuse explanations of words and subject-matter, on the Hebrew translation of the Nicomachean Ethics of Aristotle (Sefer ha-Middot). Finished at Segovia in 1455, this was probably the last and most extensive of his works; he worked upon it for one hundred days continuously in order that no interruption might hinder him from an understanding of the text. The commentary exists in many manuscripts and was widely circulated in the Middle Ages. It has been made use of in Isaac Satanow's edition of the Sefer ha-Middot (Berlin, 1784; Steinschneider, l.c. pp. 212 et seq.).

== Ethical views ==
The Kebod Elohim is Joseph's chief work. His leading ideas and principles, scattered throughout his other writings, are here brought together. In it he compares the ethical opinions of the Greeks, especially of Aristotle, with those of Judaism, a thing which had not before been earnestly or thoroughly done. For this purpose he gives many extracts ("peraḳim") from the Ethics of Aristotle, and translates chapters ix. and x., though from a Latin version. In answer to the question as to man's summum bonum he concludes it to be the Torah, which teaches and promises immortality, whereas the Greeks only speculate as to man's final goal. That the Torah and the philosophy of the Greeks have one and the same end, as some maintain, he denies, declaring the claim to be incompatible with the essence of positive religion; the Torah ordains the fulfilment of the 613 commandments, not the ethical teachings of Aristotle. Speculation within the bounds of the Torah is permitted, even commanded; and its province should be "the secret meanings of the Torah and of its rules, and the teachings of the Prophets." By this he probably indicates kabalistic dogmas. The divine commands are reasonable, although explanations based on reason, without the help of tradition often fail to explain the foundations of the commands.

== Characterization ==
Joseph ibn Shem-Ṭob was one of the most learned writers of his time. His knowledge of science and philosophy was intimate, and he had a very thorough acquaintance with Aristotle, his chief commentator Averroes, and the prominent Jewish, Muslim, and Christian writers. At the same time he was an independent and outspoken critic. He not only passed judgment upon Christianity and Islam, but he criticized Maimonides, with whose fundamental ideas he was not in sympathy, and maintained that the claim made by the cabalists that Shimon bar Yochai was the author of the Zohar was baseless. Nevertheless, in a discussion as to the proofs of the unity of God, he prefers the arguments of the kabalists to those of the philosophers. His attitude might be termed "positive Jewish," with a remarkable mixture of rationalism and dogmatism. He would allow no obscurity or confusion of ideas, and emphatically asserted that religion and philosophy are not identical in their final aim: "The Aristotelian laws make men; Jewish laws make Jews."

He was an admirer of Aristotle and Maimonides, and sought to improve the relationship between religious orthodoxy and philosophy. His work can also be considered a critique of rationalism, and he considers prophecy a higher calling than philosophy.

In the strife then raging over the study of rationalistic sciences Ibn Shem-Ṭob took the following position: The Jew in possession of the divine revelation could dispense with the sciences, although their study was useful to him, since they perfected him as a human being; but their study should be deferred to an advanced age. In this he agreed with Solomon ben Adret. He thought it was the "sophistry" of "Greek wisdom," in which speculative knowledge was the chief end of life, which made materialists of so many prominent Jews, causing their defection from Judaism and the extinction of whole communities in Aragon and Castile. In other districts, he said, not affected by this spirit, there were thousands of Jews who would rather be killed than surrender their faith.

== Bibliography ==
- Heinrich Grätz, Gesch. viii.141, 163 et seq., 178 et. seq., 421 et seq.;
- Fuenn, Keneset Yisrael, pp. 512 et seq.;
- Moritz Steinschneider, Cat. Bodl. cols. 1529 et seq.;
  - idem, Jewish Literature, pp. 97, 100, 104, 127, 309, 317;
  - idem, in Ersch and Gruber, Encyc. section ii, part 31, pp. 87 et seq.;
- M. Straschon, in Pirḥe Ẓafon, pp. 84 et seq.;
- Winter and Wünsche, Die Jüdische Litteratur, ii.790, iii.671;
- Salomon Munk, Mélanges, pp. 508 et seq.;
- Munk-Beer, Die Philosophischen Schriftsteller der Juden, pp. 118 et seq.
