= Edward Hyde (Northamptonshire cricketer) =

English cricketer

Edward Hyde (18 March 1881 – 9 October 1941) was an English cricketer who played for Northamptonshire. He was born in Earls Barton and died in Cambridge.

Hyde made a single first-class appearance, during the 1907 season, against Kent. From the tailend, he scored 3 runs in the first innings in which he batted, and a duck in the second innings. Northamptonshire lost the match by an innings margin.

Hyde took two catches during the match.
