= Thomas Hyde =

British orientalist

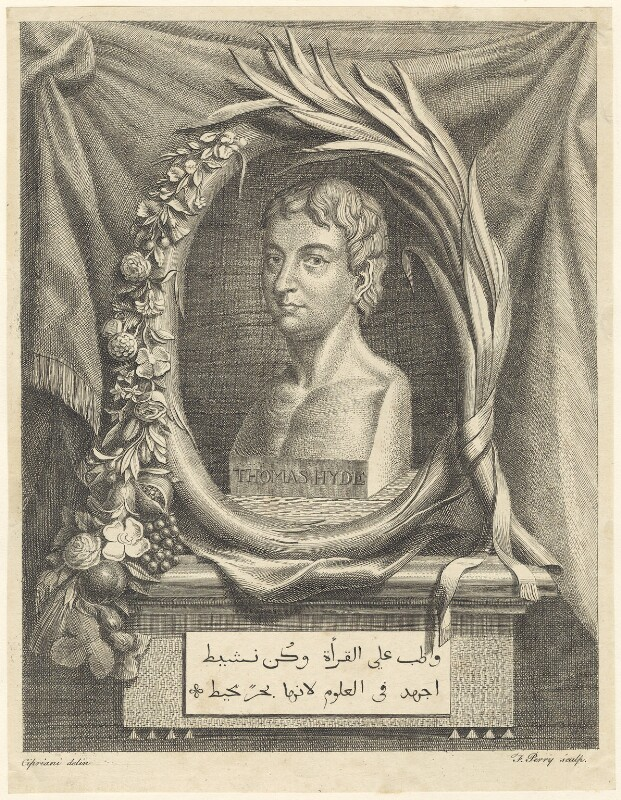
- Line engraving by Francis Perry, 1767
- Born: 29 June 1636
- Died: 18 February 1703 (aged 66)

Academic background
- Education: King's College, Cambridge
- Influences: University of Oxford

Academic work
- Sub-discipline: Hebrew studies

Thomas Hyde (29 June 1636 – 18 February 1703) was an English linguist, historian, librarian, classicist, and orientalist. His chief work was the 1700 De Vetere Religione Persarum [On the Ancient Religion of the Persians], the first attempt to use Arab and Persian sources to correct the errors of Greek and Roman historians in their descriptions of Zoroastrianism and the other beliefs of the ancient Persians, in addition to producing translations of some Zoroastrian texts.

== Life ==
He was born at Billingsley, near Bridgnorth in Shropshire, on 29 June 1636. He inherited his taste for linguistic studies, and received his first lessons in some of the Eastern tongues, from his father, who was rector of the parish.

Hyde was educated at Eton College, and in his sixteenth year entered King's College, Cambridge. There, under Abraham Wheelock, professor of Arabic, he made rapid progress in Oriental languages, so that, after only one year of residence, he was invited to London to assist Brian Walton in his edition of the Polyglott Bible. Besides correcting the Arabic, Persic and Syriac texts for that work, Hyde transcribed into Persic characters the Persian translation of the Pentateuch, which had been printed in Hebrew letters at Constantinople in 1546. To this work, which Archbishop Ussher had thought well-nigh impossible even for a native of Persia, Hyde appended the Latin version which accompanies it in the Polyglott.

In 1658 he was chosen Hebrew reader at Queen's College, Oxford, and in 1659, in consideration of his erudition in Oriental tongues, he was admitted to the degree of M.A. In the same year he was appointed under-keeper of the Bodleian Library, and in 1665 librarian-in-chief. Next year he was collated to a prebend at Salisbury, and in 1673 to the archdeaconry of Gloucester, receiving the degree of D.D. shortly afterwards. As librarian, Hyde was responsible for the publication of the Catalogus impressorum Librorum Bibliothecae Bodleianae (1674) [Catalog of the Printed Books in the Bodleian Library], the third published catalogue of the Bodleian collections.

In 1691 the death of Edward Pococke opened up to Hyde the Laudian professorship of Arabic; and in 1697, on the deprivation of Roger Altham, he succeeded to the Regius chair of Hebrew and a canonry of Christ Church.

Under Charles II, James II and William III, Hyde discharged the duties of Eastern interpreter to the court. He resigned his librarianship in 1701, giving as a reason, "my feet being left weak by the gout, I am weary of the toil and drudgery of daily attendance all times and weathers." He died at Oxford on 18 February 1703, aged 66.

== Works ==
Hyde was an assiduous classical scholar and linguist who helped popularize Orientalism and the study of Asian history in Britain. He learned Chinese from the Chinese Jesuit Michael Shen and wrote in and translated Turkish, Arabic, Syriac, Persian, Hebrew, and Malay. His chief work was the 1700 De Vetere Religione Persarum [On the Ancient Religion of the Persians], the first attempt to use Arab and Persian sources to correct the errors of Greek and Roman historians in their descriptions of Zoroastrianism and the other beliefs of the ancient Persians. He identified Zoroaster as a religious reformer. Like Engelbert Kaempfer, he is sometimes mistakenly credited with coining the word "cuneiform". He is similarly sometimes credited with coining "dualism".

His writings and translations include:

- Tabulae Long. ac Lat. Stellarum Fixarum ex Observatione Ulugh Beighi, Tamerlanis Magni Nepotis... [Tables of the Longitudes and Latitudes of the Fixed Stars from the Observatory of Ulugh Beg, Grandson of Timur the Great...] (in Latin), Oxford: Henry Hall, 1665, a translation of the c. 1438 Zij-i Sultani
- Jang Ampat Evangelia derri Tuan Kita Jesu Christi, daan Berboatan derri Jang Apostoli Bersacti, Bersalin dallam Bassa Malayo, That Is, The Four Gospels of Our Lord Jesus Christ, and the Acts of the Holy Apostles, Translated into the Malayan Tongue (in English and Malay), Oxford: Sheldonian Theater, 1677, a combination of the separate translations of the Dutchmen A.C. Ruyl, J. Van Heurn, and J. Van Hasel with an English foreword by Hyde introducing the Malay language, its orthography, and its grammar.
- "De Mensuribus et Ponderibus Sinensium Epistola [Letter on Chinese Weights and Measures]", De Mensuris et Ponderibus Antiquis Libri Tres [Three Books on Ancient Weights and Measures] (in Latin), Oxford: Sheldonian Theater, 1688, pp. 312-349.
- אגרת אורחות שלם Id Est, Itinera Mundi, Sic Dicta Nempe Cosmographia... [The Letter on the Paths of the World, That Is, The Paths of the World, Thus Certainly Called the Cosmography...] (in Latin), Oxford: Sheldonian Theater, 1691, a translation of Abraham Farissol's 1524 Iggeret Orḥot 'Olam.
- De Ludis Orientalibus Libri Duo... [Two Books on Eastern Games...] (in Latin), vol. I & II], Oxford: Sheldonian Theater, 1694.
- Historia Religionis Veterum Persarum, Eorumque Magorum... [History of the Religion of the Ancient Persians and That of the Magi] (in Latin), Oxford: Sheldonian Theater, 1700.

In parts of the De Ludis Orientalibus, he relates his understanding of various Chinese games as explained to him by Michael Shen. These include coan ki and a confused account of weiqi (i.e., go) which includes the first Latin mention of the game's concept of "eyes". The Historia Religionis Veterum Persarum was republished by Hunt and Costard in 1760. The other works—including some previously unpublished manuscripts—were collected, edited, and published by Gregory Sharpe in 1767 under the title Syntagma Dissertationem quas Olim Thomas Hyde Separatim Edidit. Sharpe also provided a biography of Hyde in his work.

== See also ==
- List of chess historians
