= Eliezer ben Solomon Ashkenazi =

Eliezer ben Solomon Ashkenazi was a Rabbi and Talmudical scholar born in Poland about the beginning of the 19th century, who resided afterward in Tunis. He published at Metz in 1849, under the title Dibre Hakamim ("Words of [the] Wise"), a selection of 11 ancient manuscripts:

- Midrash Wayosha, on the Pentateuch
- Joseph Caro's Commentary on Lamentations
- Maimonides' Hokmat ha-'Ibbur, a treatise on the computation of the intercalary month
- Abraham bar Hiyyah's seventh "gate" of the third treatise on the computation of the intercalary month, with a responsum by Hai Gaon on the calculation of the years since the Creation
- Moses Narboni's Maamar ba-Behirah, a treatise on free-will
- Nussah Ketab, a letter from Joshua Lorki on religion
- Isaac Ardotiel's Meliẓah 'al ha-'Et, a prose poem on the pen
- David ben Yom-tob's Yesodot ha-Maskil, 13 articles of belief of an enlightened man
- RaMBaM, a letter from Maimonides addressed to Rabbi Japhet the Dayyan
- A letter by Elijah of Italy, written from Palestine to his family at Ferrara, in 1438
- Jacob Provençal's Be-Debar Limmud ha-Hokmah, on the study of science.

S. Munk has written an introduction to this collection, which contains also, as an appendix, a French translation of Yesodot ha-Maskil by "H. B."

Ashkenazi published also Ta'am Zekenim ("Taste [of] Old Men"), edited by R. Kirchheim, a collection of old manuscripts and prints dealing with Jewish literature and history in the Middle Ages (Frankfort-on-the-Main, 1854).
