= David ben Yom Tov ibn Bilia =

Portuguese Jewish philosopher

David ben Yom Tov ibn Bilia was a Portuguese Jewish philosopher who lived in the thirteenth and fourteenth centuries.

Ibn Bilia was the author of many works, the greater part of which, no longer in existence, are known only by quotations. Among them were: Me'or 'Enayim, a commentary on the Pentateuch, quoted by Caspi, Levi ben Gershon, and chiefly by the author's countryman Samuel Zarza, who often criticized Ibn Bilia's interpretations as being too mystical; and Yesodot ha-Maskil, published, with a French translation by S. Klein, in the collection Dibre Ḥakamim, Metz, 1849.

In the Yesodot Ibn Bilia propounded thirteen articles of belief in addition to those of Maimonides. These are:

1. The existence of incorporeal intellects;
2. The creation of the world;
3. The existence of a future life;
4. Emanation of the soul from God;
5. The soul's existence through its own substance and its self-consciousness;
6. Its existence independent of the body it subsequently occupies;
7. Retribution of the soul;
8. Perdition of the souls of the wicked;
9. Superiority of the Mosaic law over philosophy;
10. The presence of an esoteric as well as an exoteric meaning in Holy Scripture;
11. Inadmissibility of emendations of the Torah;
12. The reward of the fulfilment of the divine precepts implied in the precepts themselves;
13. The inadequacy of ceremonial laws alone for the realization of human perfection.

These, together with the thirteen articles of Maimonides, make twenty-six, the numerical value of the Tetragrammaton.

Ibn Bilia also wrote Ẓiyyurim, an ethical work; Kilale ha-Higgayon, a work on logic, of which only a fragment has been preserved (Neubauer, "Cat. Bodl. Hebr. MSS." No. 2168); Ma'amar bi-Segullot 'Or ha-Naḥash, a treatise on the medicinal virtues of the skin of the serpent, translated from Johannes Paulinus' Latin translation "Salus Vitæ" (Munich, No. 228).

In the past some scholars, including the nineteenth century scholar Moritz Steinschneider, have identified Ibn Bilia with the David ben Yom Tov who was the father of the Catalan astronomer Jacob ben David ben Yom Tov Poel. That David wrote works including the Kelal Qatan ("Concise Summary"), a treatise on the medical applications of astrology. However the two are now believed to have been separate individuals.

== Jewish Encyclopedia bibliography ==
- Zunz, Additamenta zu Delitzsch's Katalog der Leipziger Bibliothek, p. 326;
- Dukes, in Literaturblatt des Orients, viii. 116, 456;
- idem, Naḥal Ḳedumim, p. 48;
- Senior Sachs, Ha-Paliṭ, pp. 31–33;
- Steinschneider, Cat. Bodl. col. 857;
- Kayserling, Gesch. der Juden in Portugal, p. 68;
- Steinschneider, Hebr. Uebers. pp. 499, 806.
