= Abraham Farissol =

Hebrew scholar and geographer (1451-1525)

Abraham ben Mordecai Farissol
- אברהם בן מרדכי פריצול
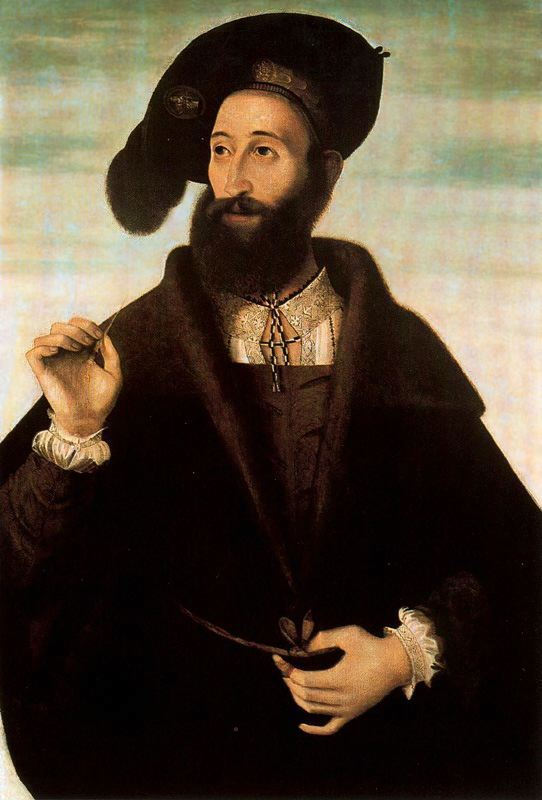
- Farissol c. 1525
- Born: c. 1451; Avignon, Holy Roman Empire
- Died: 1525 or 1526 (aged 73-75); Ferrara, Duchy of Ferrara, Holy Roman Empire
- Writing career
- Language: Hebrew
- Notable works: Magen Avraham (1514); Iggeret Orḥot 'Olam (1524)

Abraham ben Mordecai Farissol (Hebrew: אַבְרָהָם בֵּן מֹרְדְּכַי פָרִיצוֹל, translit. Avraham ben Mordekhai Faritzol, Latin: Abrahamus Peritsol; c. 1451 – 1525 or 1526) was a Jewish-Italian geographer, cosmographer, scribe, and polemicist. He was the first Hebrew writer to deal in detail with the newly-discovered Americas.

== Biography ==
Abraham ben Mordecai Farissol was born in Avignon, where his family had lived for at least a century. Soon after 1468 Farissol went to Mantua, where he worked for Judah ben Yehiel Messer Leon as a scribe. He went to Ferrara in 1473, where he acted as hazzan in the synagogue, and occupied himself besides in the copying of manuscripts.

Farissol immersed himself in Renaissance life revolving around the enlightened court of Ercole d'Este I, Duke of Ferrara. He was also attendant at the court of Lorenzo de' Medici, where his interest in traveller's tales and discovery was whetted.

== Work ==
=== Women's prayer books ===
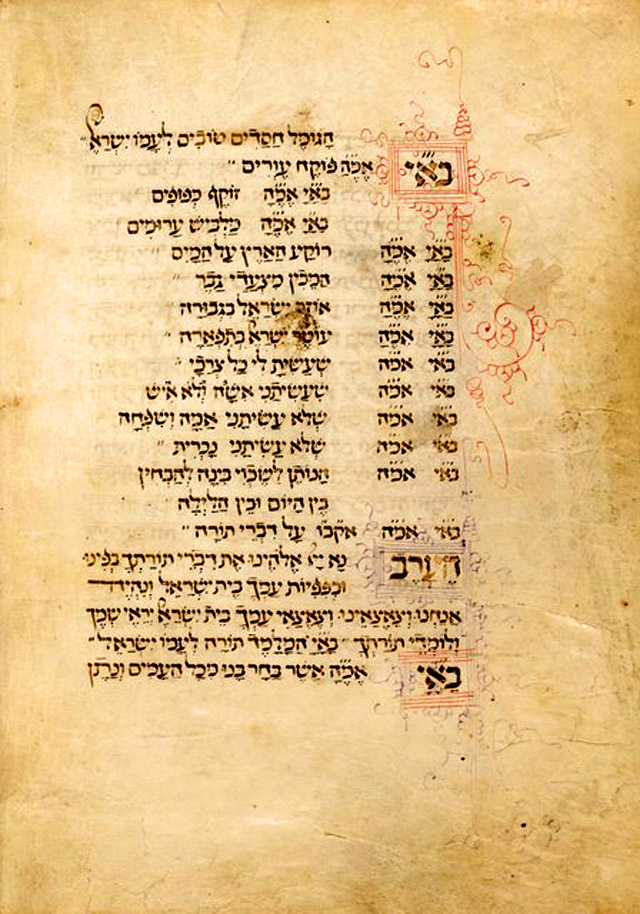
Birkot hashachar in a woman's machzor by Farissol (1471)

In 1471 and 1480 Farrisol published two women's prayer books, notable for replacing the traditional prayer in the Birkot hashachar recited by women, "Blessed are You, Lord our God, Master of Universe for creating me according to Your Will," with "Blessed are You Lord our God, Master of the Universe, for You made me a woman and not a man" ("בָּאָ״יָ אֶמֶ״הָ שְׁעַשִׂיתַֿנִי אִשָׁה וְלֹא אִישׁ"). The 1480 book was donated to the National Library of Israel in 1973.

=== Biblical commentary and translations ===
Abraham Farissol wrote a short commentary to the Torah under the title of Pirḥe Shoshannim (פרחי שושנים), and later published a commentary to Job, which includes a study on the location of the Land of Uz (in Biblia Rabbinica, Venice, 1518).

In 1525 Farissol wrote a commentary to Ecclesiastes. He also translated into Hebrew Aristotle's Logic and the compendium of Porphyry. Some sermons of Farissol's, and a number of letters which he wrote in 1468 and 1474 to several of his contemporaries, are also extant.

=== Magen Avraham ===
Farissol wrote a polemical work under the title of Magen Avraham (מגן אברהם), or Vikkuaḥ ha-Dat (ויכוח הדת), in three parts, the second against Christianity, the third against Islam. He was induced to write this work by the fact that he was chosen to represent Judaism at the court of d'Este in a disputation with two Dominican monks. By order of the duke he also made a résumé in Italian of the Hebrew text, so that his antagonists might understand his position. The work was largely based on Simeon ben Zemah Duran's Keshet u-Magen.

=== Iggeret Orḥot 'Olam ===
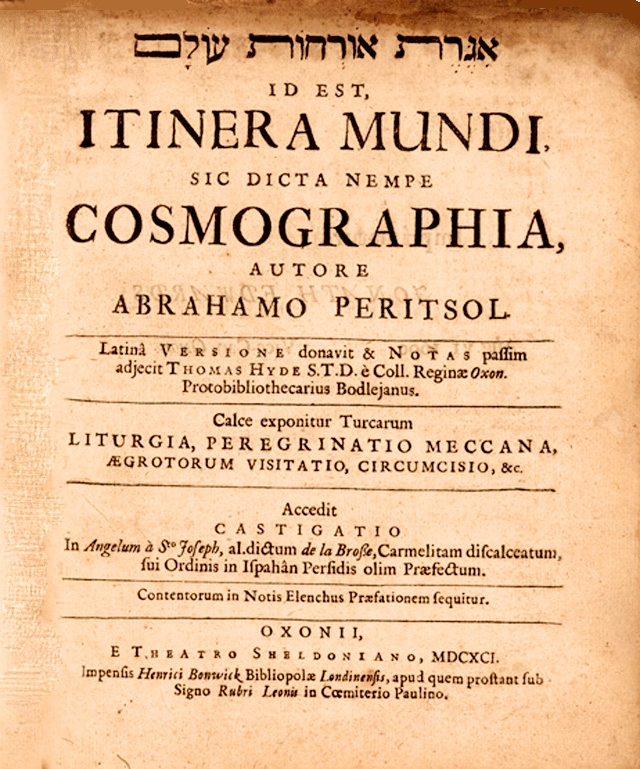
Title page of Thomas Hyde's 1691 Latin translation of the Iggeret, misrendered as שלם אורחות אגרת.

The most important of his writings is the Iggeret Orḥot 'Olam (אגרת אורחות עולם, 'Epistle of the Paths of the World') (Ferrara, 1524; Venice, 1587), a cosmographic and geographic work based upon original research as well as the works of Christian and Arab geographers, especially Bergomas' Supplementum, Amerigo's Cosmographia, and Fracanzano da Montalboddo's Paesi novamente retrovati e nova mundo da Alberico Vesputio riorentino intitulato. Each of the treatise's thirty chapters deals with a certain geographical area or subject, and many cosmological and historical matters are also treated. The book contains accounts of the newly discovered parts of the world, the new Portuguese sea route to India, the Ten Tribes, David Reuveni, and the condition of the Jews in various parts of the world. It includes descriptions of the Amerindians, emphasizing their sexual practices, social organization, lack of property, health, the richness of their wildlife, and their wealth in gems and metals. Farissol also used a combination of textual evidence with geographic and climatic evidence to determine the location of the Garden of Eden. The Iggeret was translated into Latin by Bodleian librarian Thomas Hyde under the title of "Tractatus Itinerum Mundi" (Oxford, 1691).
