= Jacob Canizal =

Author of notes on Rashi's commentary to the Pentateuch

Jacob Canizal (Hebrew: יעקב קניזל, romanized: Yaʻaḳov Ḳanizal; fl. 15th century) was the author of notes on Rashi's commentary to the Pentateuch, which were published in Perushim le-Rashi (Constantinople, 1525).

== Publications ==
- Perushim le-Rashi. Constantinople. 1525.
