= Birkot hashachar =

Jewish blessing

Birkot hashachar or Birkot haShachar (Hebrew: ברכות השחר, 'morning blessings' or 'blessings [of] the dawn') are a series of blessings recited at the beginning of Shacharit, the Jewish morning prayer liturgy. The blessings represent thanks to God for the new day.

The order of the blessings is not defined by Halakha and may vary by siddur but is generally based on the order of activities customary upon arising.

== The blessings ==
=== Al netilat yadayim ===
This blessing represents the cleanliness of one's hands following ritual defilement. It is recited before Shacharit.

=== Asher Yatzar ===
This is a blessing regarding the workings of one's body. It is also recited after urination or defecation after washing one's hands and exiting the restroom.

=== Elohai Neshama ===
This paragraph represents thanks to God for the return of one's soul after sleeping. When one sleeps, the soul departs the body. This state is referred to as a "semi-death" in tractate Berakhot 57b:13–14. Upon awakening, the body is reunited with the soul.

=== Blessings of Torah study ===
Birkot hashachar also includes blessings pertaining to Torah study. It is forbidden to begin the day's Torah studies before reciting blessings. One of the blessings is identical to the blessing recited by a person called for an aliyah.

Since one is required to fulfill a mitzvah immediately after reciting a blessing on that mitzvah without interruption, some verses from the oral and written Torah are recited immediately following this blessing. In the Eastern Ashkenazic rite, verses including Numbers 6:24–26 (known as the Priestly Blessing), Mishnah Peah 1:1, and tractate Shabbat 127a are recited. In the Western Ashkenazic rite, the korbanot section is recited immediately.

=== Blessings of Praise ===
This is a series of blessings of praise. Although the Talmud, in Berakhot 60b, prescribes their recitation alongside the actions that they are associated with, the common practice is to recite them all as a series of blessings.
