= Jacob ben David ben Yom Tov =

Medieval Spanish astronomer

Jacob ben David ben Yom Tov (also Yomtob or Jomtob or Bonjourn or Bonet), also known as ha-Poel (or Fu'al), was a Catalan Jewish astronomer and astrologer. He lived, probably at Perpignan, in southern France in the fourteenth century.

He was the author of astronomical tables prepared at Perpignan in 1361. These tables, still extant in manuscript (Bibliothèque Nationale, Paris, MS. No. 10,901; Adolf Neubauer, "Cat. Bodl. Hebr. MSS." No. 2072, 2), enjoyed a great reputation. They were translated into Latin in the fifteenth century, and were the subject of many Hebrew commentaries, among which was one written by Joseph ben Saul Ḳimḥi (MS Casanatense 3155) (Note: Misprinted in Renan as "I, V, I, 7 de la bibliotheque Casanatensis in Rome", which Breuer further confused as "Vatican MSS Nos. i., v., 1, 7". The true manuscript is MS Casanatense I.V.13 or 3155. See G. Sacerdote, Catalogo dei codici ebraici della Biblioteca Casanatense, pp. 635-638 no. 204.). Many manuscripts of these tables were retranslated from Latin into Hebrew.

His father David ben Yom-Tov, also called David Bongoron, was identified in the past with the Portuguese Jewish philosopher David ben Yom-Tov ibn Bilia by some scholars, including the nineteenth century scholar Moritz Steinschneider. However the two are now believed to have been separate individuals.
