= Edward Hyde =

Edward Hyde may refer to:

- Edward Hyde (priest) (1607–1659), English royalist cleric
- Edward Hyde, 1st Earl of Clarendon (1609–1674), English historian and statesman
- Edward Hyde (died 1665), British MP for Salisbury
- Edward Hyde, 3rd Earl of Clarendon (1661–1723), Governor of New York and New Jersey
- Edward Hyde (Governor of North Carolina) (1667–1712), first Governor of North Carolina (January–September 1712)
- Edward Hyde (fictional character), The Antagonist of Strange Case of Dr Jekyll and Mr Hyde
- Edward Hyde (Northamptonshire cricketer) (1881–1941), cricketer
- Edward Hyde (Cambridge cricketer), cricketer

== See also ==
- Edward Hide, British jockey
