= Raphael Kirchheim =

German Jewish scholar

Raphael Kirchheim (born in Frankfurt am Main 1804; died there September 6, 1889) was a German Jewish scholar.

== Life ==
Kirchheim was of a pugnacious disposition and took a very active part in the general attack on the Amsterdam administration of the Ḥaluḳḳah in 1843-44, which was especially directed against Hirsch Lehren of Amsterdam, president of the board of administration. Kirchheim severely criticized Samson Raphael Hirsch's Der Pentateuch in a pamphlet entitled Die Neue Exegetenschule: Eine Kritische Dornenlese (Breslau, 1867).

Kirchheim left a valuable collection, of Hebraica and Judaica, to the religious school of the M. Horovitz Synagogue at Frankfort.

== Works ==
He published many articles in German magazines. Kirchheim edited or published:

- S. L. Rapoport's "Tokaḥat Megullah, Sendschreiben an die Rabbinerversammlung zu Frankfurt-am-Main" (Hebr. and German, the translation being by Kirchheim himself), Frankfort-on-the-Main, 1845
- Azulai's "Shem ha-Gedolim" and "Wa'ad la-Ḥakamim" with the annotations of A. Fuld and E. Carmoly, ib. 1847
- "Karme Shomeron," an introduction to the Talmudical treatise "Kutim," with an additional letter by S. D. Luzzatto, ib. 1851 (the appendix gives the seven smaller treatises of the Jerusalem Talmud, according to a Carmoly manuscript)
- Eliezer Ashkenazi's "Ṭa'am Zeḳenim," ib. 1854
- B. Goldberg's edition of Jonah ibn Janah's "Sefer ha-Riḳmah," with additional notes of his, ib. 1856
- "Perush 'al Dibre ha-Yamim, Commentar zur Chronik aus dem X Jahrhundert," ib. 1874
- Abraham Geiger's "Nachgelassene Schriften," v. 1, Berlin, 1877.

He wrote also additional notes to:

- A. Ginzburg's "Perush ReDaK 'al ha-Torah," Presburg, 1842
- S. Werblumer's edition of Joseph ibn Caspi's "'Ammude Kesef," ib. 1848
- Filipowski's "Sefer Teshubot Dunash ben Labraṭ."
