= Frank Hyde (footballer) =

English footballer (1927–2004)

Personal information
- Full name: Frank Lomas Hyde
- Date of birth: 11 January 1927
- Place of birth: Wath-upon-Dearne, England
- Date of death: 11 May 2004 (aged 77)
- Place of death: Barnsley, England
- Position: Goalkeeper

Senior career*
Years	Team	Apps	(Gls)
- Wath Athletic
1947–1948	Wolverhampton Wanderers	0	(0)
1948–1952	Bradford City	34	(0)
- Scarborough
- Selby Town
- Bridlington Town
- Frickley Athletic
- Denaby United

Managerial career
- Mexborough Town
- * Club domestic league appearances and goals

Frank Lomas Hyde (11 January 1927 – 11 May 2004) was an English professional footballer who played as a goalkeeper.

== Career ==
Born in Wath-upon-Dearne, Hyde spent four years in the Royal Navy and worked as a wages clerk at Manvers colliery. While playing for Wath Athletic he was spotted by a scout, and signed for Wolverhampton Wanderers. He signed for Bradford City in December 1948. He had previously During his time with Bradford City he made 34 appearances in the Football League, as well as one appearance in the FA Cup. He left the club in July 1952 to sign for Scarborough. He later played for Selby Town, Bridlington Town, Frickley Athletic and Denaby United, and he was also manager of Mexborough Town.

== Sources ==
- Frost, Terry (1988). Bradford City A Complete Record 1903-1988. Breedon Books Sport. ISBN 0-907969-38-0.
