= Henry J. Hyde (Medal of Honor) =

- Born: February 11, 1846; Bangor, Maine
- Died: July 25, 1893 (aged 47)
- Burial place: Marion National Cemetery, Marion, Indiana
- Military career
- Allegiance: United States of America
- Branch: United States Army
- Service years: 1869 - 1884
- Rank: Sergeant
- Units: Company M, 1st Cavalry Regiment
- Conflicts: Indian Wars
- Awards: - Medal of Honor

Henry J. Hyde (February 11, 1846 – July 25, 1893) was a United States Army Sergeant during the Indian Wars who received the Medal of Honor on August 12, 1875, for service during the winter of 1872–73.

Hyde joined the army from New York City in August 1869, and was discharged in November 1884.

== Medal of Honor citation ==
Citation:

Gallant conduct during campaigns and engagements with Apaches.

== See also ==
- List of Medal of Honor recipients
