= George Hyde (RAF officer) =

British WWI flying ace

George Arthur Hyde
- Born: 31 July 1893; Thornton Dale, Yorkshire, England
- Died: Unknown
- Military career
- Allegiance: United Kingdom
- Branch: British Army; Royal Air Force
- Service years: 1914–1919
- Rank: Captain
- Nickname: Milford
- Units: King's Royal Rifle Corps; No. 54 Squadron RFC
- Conflicts: World War I; Western Front
- Awards: Military Cross

Captain George Arthur Hyde MC (31 July 1893 – ?) was a British World War I flying ace credited with five aerial victories.

== Military service ==
Having served as a cadet in the Officers' Training Corps, Hyde was commissioned as a second lieutenant on 16 November 1914. He served in France in the 10th (Service) Battalion, King's Royal Rifle Corps, where in May 1916 he was awarded the Military Cross. His citation read:

Temporary Second Lieutenant George Arthur Hyde, 10th Bn., KRRC.

"For conspicuous gallantry. While creeping up to attack an enemy working party he met an enemy patrol, which he opened fire on at very close range. Finally his own party came under heavy fire and suffered casualties. He brought in one wounded man, and then at once organised a relief party which brought in the remainder."

In late 1916 Hyde transferred to the Royal Flying Corps, underwent pilot's training, and was promoted to lieutenant on 1 January 1917. On 6 January he was transferred to the General List and appointed a flying officer. He was posted to No. 54 Squadron in February 1917 to fly the Sopwith Pup. He scored his first win the next month, on 17 March. He was appointed flight commander of "A" Flight on 3 October with the acting rank of captain. On 18 October, he racked up his fifth triumph; with Second Lieutenant Michael Gonne, he shot down an Albatros D.V, to be credited with the only destruction of an enemy craft on his record. His other four victories were driven down out of control. He left the RAF after the war, being transferred to the unemployed list on 8 January 1919.

Hyde was also an amateur artist. One of his paintings, entitled "Dogfight, 1917", is on display at the World War History & Art Museum in Alliance, Ohio.

Hyde became a reverend after the war. In 1925, he married Mollie De Little.

== Bibliography ==
- Shores, Christopher F.; Franks, Norman & Guest, Russell F. (1990). Above the Trenches: a Complete Record of the Fighter Aces and Units of the British Empire Air Forces 1915–1920. London, UK: Grub Street. ISBN 978-0-948817-19-9.
