= George Hyde (bishop) =

American bishop

George Augustine Hyde (July 2, 1923 – May 4, 2010) was an American bishop. He founded the Society of Domestic Missionaries and co-established with John Kazantks the first Christian congregation in the United States to minister openly to and with openly homosexual parishioners. He later served as metropolitan archbishop of the Orthodox-Catholic Church of America from 1970 to 1983.

Hyde was a native of Chattanooga, Tennessee, who grew up in a Southern Baptist family in Atlanta and attended a seminary though he did not complete his seminary education. He was a high school teacher in Atlanta when he met Kazantks, an immigrant from Greece and former bishop of the Greek Orthodox Church who had been forced out of his native country after coming out.

Affected by the denial of communion to, or outright excommunication of, openly homosexual parishioners, Hyde and Kazantks set out to form their own independent congregation that would welcome openly homosexual members. Their newly formed independent parish held its first formal meeting at the Winecoff Hotel in Atlanta on July 1, 1946, on the occasion of Hyde's ordination to the priesthood of the parish at the hands of Bishop Kazantks. The congregation celebrated Mass in the meeting room of the hotel, with its rental costs underwritten by the management of the Cotton Blossom Room, a gay bar located within the hotel, until late November when it moved to a large residential building in Atlanta's business district that could house a chapel and living quarters for local clergy. Informational and instructional classes continued to be held at the hotel until it was destroyed by fire on December 7.

The church grew from an initial 85 members to over 200 members by the end of 1947, partly due to word of mouth promotion through Atlanta's LGBT community. In 1950, Hyde established the Society of Domestic Missionaries which coupled its missionary work with secular jobs as domestic workers.

Kazantks, who had moved to Savannah to help develop the church in southern Georgia, returned to Greece in 1957 and died there later that year. Before leaving, Kazantks placed Hyde in touch with Archbishop Clement Sherwood of the American Holy Orthodox Catholic and Apostolic Eastern Church, who ordained him a bishop of the church on May 7, 1957. In 1960, Sherwood designated Hyde as "Bishop of the Western Rite Missions" of the OCCA and charged him with furthering the consolidation of ethnic bishoprics within the church into an indigenous Orthodox tradition.

Sherwood died on April 9, 1969. The following year, Hyde was elected and enthroned as metropolitan archbishop, resulting in an exodus of ethnic bishoprics within the church who feared the new name of the "Orthodox-Catholic Church of America" would be foisted on them.

Hyde retired for health reasons in 1983 and was succeeded by Metropolitan Archbishop Alfred Louis Lankenau as primate of the church. He came out of retirement in 1995 when the OCCA began to ordain women as clergy, a move which Hyde opposed. Hyde led a schism of members from the OCCA (known as the Autocephalous Orthodox Catholic Church of America) while living at his home in Belleair, Florida, a practice which he continued until his death on May 4, 2010. His ashes were interred in his family plot in Marietta, Georgia.

== Awards ==
- Key to the City of Fajardo, Puerto Rico, awarded by Mayor Emillio Pacheco (1982)
