= Dalia (given name) =

- Gender: Female
- Language: Hebrew, Arabic, Lithuanian, and Persian

Origin
- Origin: Hebrew, Arabic, Persian, and Lithuanian
- Region of origin: Persia, Arabia, Israel, Lithuania

Other names
- Related names: Dalila, Dahlia, Dahl, Dalya

Dalia is a feminine name. It is used in Arabic (Arabic: داليا), Hebrew (Hebrew: דַּלְיָה), Lithuanian and Persian (Persian: دالیا).

The name means "branch," "flower," "gentle," "branch," or "bough of a tree". This meaning is shared in both Hebrew and Arabic. There are several biblical and Talmudic references. It has a significant presence in religious and biblical contexts. However, confusion arose among Hebrew speakers Dalia is not a similar meaning with the name of the flower Dahlia, named in honor of Anders Dahl, a Swedish botanist, by Spanish naturalist Antonio José de Cavanilles, director of the Real Jardín Botánico de Madrid of 18th century. Dahlia is a native flower of Mexico and the national flower of the country. However, in Mexico, it is spelled as "Dalia" another derivative of its official name which is commonly used and popular in Spanish speaking countries.

Dalia is a popular feminine name in Lithuania, meaning 'destiny' or 'fate' and derived from Lithuanian pagan traditions. It is the name of the ancient Lithuanian goddess of destiny. Notable people with the name include:

== Given name ==
=== Dalia ===
- Dalia (singer), Egyptian singer
- Dalia Alcocer (born 2004), Mexican gymnast
- Dalia Allam (born 1980), Egyptian synchronized swimmer
- Dalia Amotz (1938–1994), Israeli photographer
- Dalia Asanavičiūtė (born 1975), Lithuanian politician
- Dalia Reyes Barrios (born 1957), Venezuelan architect, art collector, philanthropist, and socialite
- Dalia El Behery (born 1970), Egyptian actress, model, TV presenter, and Miss Egypt 1990
- Dalia Colli (born 1976), Italian make-up artist
- Dalia Contreras (born 1983), Venezuelan taekwondo practitioner
- Dalia Blimke-Dereń (born 1979), Polish chess player
- Dalia Dokšaitė (born 1955), Lithuanian painter
- Dalia Dorner (born 1934), Israeli judge
- Dalia Al-Dujaili (born 1999), British writer and editor
- Dalia Fadila (1971/72–2023), Israeli educator
- Dalia Faitelson (born 1966), Danish-Israeli musician
- Dalia Fernández (born 1990), Dominican model
- Dalia Friedland (born 1935), Israeli actress and singer
- Dalia Gallico, Italian author, professor, and art director
- Dalia El-Gebaly (born 1992), Egyptian swimmer
- Dalia Kutraitė-Giedraitienė (born 1952), Lithuanian journalist and politician
- Dalia Grinkevičiūtė (1927–1987), Lithuanian physician and writer
- Dalia Grybauskaitė (born 1956), the first female President of Lithuania from 2009 until 2019
- Dalia Henry (born 1965), Cuban basketball player
- Dalia Hernández (born 1985), Mexican actress
- Dalia Hertz (born 1942), Israeli poet
- Dalia Ibelhauptaitė (born 1967), Lithuanian opera, theatre, and film director, producer and playwright
- Dalia Inés (born 1948), Mexican singer, dancer, actress, and writer
- Dalia Íñiguez (1901–1995), Cuban actress
- Dalia Itzik (born 1952), Israeli politician
- Dalia Judovitz (born 1951), Romanian professor
- Dalia Juknevičiūtė (1935–1975), Lithuanian painter
- Dalia Kaddari (born 2001), Italian sprinter
- Dalia Dassa Kaye, American academic
- Dalia Kirschbaum, American Earth scientist
- Dalia Koriat (born 1969), Israeli tennis player
- Dalia Kreivienė (born 1972), Lithuanian diplomat
- Dalia Kuodytė (1962–2023), Lithuanian historian and politician
- Dalia Kutkaitė (born 1965), Lithuanian gymnast
- Daliah Lavi (1942–2017), Israeli actress and singer
- Dalia Leinartė (born 1958), Lithuanian member and former Chair of the UN Committee on the Elimination of Discrimination against Women (CEDAW)
- Dalia Levin (born 1946), Israeli museum director and art curator
- Dalia Marx, Israeli rabbi
- Dalia Matusevičienė (born 1962), Lithuanian runner
- Dale Messick (1906–2005), born Dalia Messick, creator of the comic strip Brenda Starr
- Dalia Miniataitė (born 1961), Lithuanian economist
- Dalia Mogahed (born 1974), American Muslim scholar and adviser to President Barack Obama
- Dalia Molina (born 1999), Mexican footballer
- Dalia Mostafa (born 1980), Egyptian actress and model
- Dalia Muccioli (born 1993), Italian cyclist
- Dalia Nausheen (1954/55–2026), Bangladeshi singer
- Dalia Ofer (born 1939), Israeli historian
- Dalia Haj-Omar, Sudanese human rights activist
- Dalia Rabin-Pelossof (born 1950), Israeli politician
- Dalia Shusterman, Canadian-American musician
- Dalia Sofer (born 1972), Iranian-born American writer
- Dalia Stasevska (born 1984), Ukrainian-born Finnish conductor
- Dalia Teišerskytė (1944–2023), Lithuanian journalist and politician
- Dalia Raudonikytė With (1970–2018), Lithuanian composer and pianist
- Dalia Wood (1924–2013), Canadian politician
- Dalia Zafirova (born 1991), Bulgarian tennis player
- Dalia Tórrez Zamora (born 1990), Nicaraguan swimmer
- Dalia Ziada (born 1982), Egyptian writer

=== Daliah ===
- Daliah Abu Laban (born 1995), Saudi footballer
- Daliah Lavi (1942–2017), Israeli actress, singer, and model
- Daliah Saper, American attorney
- Daliah Wachs (born 1971), American physician and radio personality

=== Dhalia ===
- Dhalia (1925–1991), Indonesian actress
