= Dalia =

Dalia may refer to:

== People ==
- Dalia (given name), a given name and listing of people with the name
- Dalia (singer), Egyptian singer
- Badrunnesa Dalia, known as Dalia, Bangladeshi singer
- Joe Dalia, American politician

== Places ==
- Dalia (oil field), an offshore oil field in Angola
- Dalia, Israel, a kibbutz
- Dalia River, Israel
- Dalia, the Latinized name for Dalsland, Sweden

== Other uses ==
- Dalia (mythology), a Lithuanian goddess
- Dalia, a South Asian broken wheat and mung lentil porridge
- Dalia an opera for Garsington Opera
- Dalia (Dvarionas opera), 1959 Lithuanian-language opera
- Dalia (film), a 1930 Indian silent film directed by Madhu Bose, written by Rabindranath Tagore, starring Ramola Devi and B. S. Rajhans

== See also ==
- Dhalia (1925–1991), Indonesian actress
- Dahlia (disambiguation)
