= Dahlia (disambiguation) =

Dahlia is a genus of plants.

Dahlia may also refer to:

== Animals ==
- Dahlia (moth), a genus of moths
- Dahlia anemone, a sea anemone

== People ==
- Dahlia Duhaney (born 1970), Jamaican sprinter
- Dahlia Lithwick, Canadian contributing editor at Newsweek and senior editor at Slate
- Dahlia Ravikovitch (1936-2005), Israeli poet and peace activist
- Dahlia Salem (born 1971), American actress

== Fictional characters ==
- Dahlia, a character in 2013 TV series The Originals
- Dahlia, a character in the Angry Birds video game, television and film franchise
- Dahlia, a character in 2020 video game Genshin Impact
- Dahlia, a character in 2023 film Wish
- The Dahlia, a character in 2023 video game Honkai: Star Rail
- Aunt Dahlia Travers, a character in the Jeeves novels
- Dahlia Gillespie, a character in video games series Silent Hill
- Dahlia Hawthorne, a character in video games series Ace Attorney
- Dahlia Lynley-Chivers, a character in the Sookie Stackhouse series and computer game Dying for Daylight

== Horse racing ==
- Dahlia (horse), a thoroughbred racehorse
- Dahlia Stakes, a horse race in Great Britain
- Dahlia Stakes (United States), a thoroughbred horse race in Maryland
- Dahlia Handicap, a thoroughbred race in California

== Other uses ==
- USS Dahlia (1862), a tugboat in the American Civil War
- Dahlia (album), by the band X Japan
- "Dahlia" (song), by X Japan
- Cyclone Dahlia (2017)
- A cosmetics company created by Arlene Dahl

== See also ==
- Dalea, a genus of plants
- Dahlia (given name), the name
- Dalia (disambiguation)
- The Black Dahlia (disambiguation)
- The Blue Dahlia (disambiguation)
