= Abd Almoniem Rahama =

Sudanese journalist, author, and human rights activist

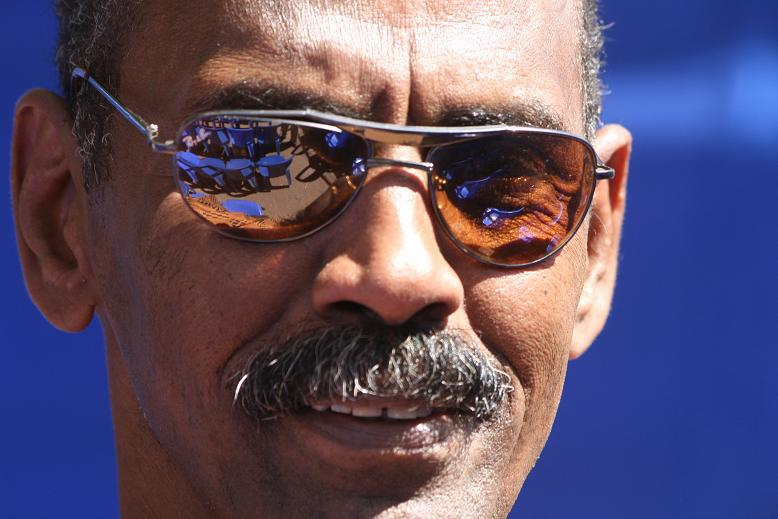
Abd Almoniem Rahama

Abd Almoniem Rahama, also spelled Moneim Rahama (Arabic: عبدالمنعم رحمه; born 1960 in Hasahisa, Sudan) is a Sudanese journalist, author, poet and human rights activist. He became known for participating in cultural events in Khartoum and Wad Madani in the 1980s.

== Biography ==
Rahama formerly headed Sudana, an organization that promoted the work of marginalized art and literature groups in Sudan. He was a member of the Sudanese Writers’ Union during the 1980s and headed the Arabic section of the Sudan Radio Service network in Nairobi between 2003 and 2005.

Rahama also co-founded the daily Ajras al-Hurriya ("Bells of Freedom"), and served as its administrative director. An opposition newspaper which was closed by the government in 2011, a day before the independence of South Sudan. Known for his opposition towards dictatorship, Rahama was involved in the 1985 April Revolution against Jaafar Nimeiry. He was forced to go into exile after the 1989 Bashir coup, and spent several years in Kenya and Ethiopia, where he met his wife.

Rahama returned to Sudan after the Comprehensive Peace Agreement was signed in 2005. He was also instrumental in the development of a traveling theatre to promote peaceful dialogue among Sudan's diverse cultures. In 2009 he took a role as culture advisor to Blue Nile Government and created culture festivals in Damazin, playing a role in creating Malek Agar Culture Centre.

== Arrest, death sentence and exile in France ==
Rahama was arrested by Sudan's National Intelligence and Security Service (NISS) on 2 September in Damazin, the capital of Blue Nile State, one day after the resumption of fighting between the Sudanese national army and forces loyal to the northern sector of the Sudan People's Liberation Movement (SPLM-N).

Hurriyat, an online Sudanese human rights publication, reported that a former detainee, who was imprisoned with Rahama, stated that the writer was subjected to constant beatings and forbidden from using the toilet.

Saad, who spoke with Rahama by phone a few days before his arrest, said he believes his colleague's political activities, especially his affiliation with the SPLM-N, made him a target when tensions rose between that party and the Sudanese government in Blue Nile State.

On 24 November 2011, Rahama and 18 other SPLM-N members where summed to a court, where they all were given the death penalty without the right to defend themselves. This type of court has often been tactically used by NCP (National Congress Party) ruler of Sudan to get opposition figures sentenced to death quickly and was used heavily at 1989, 1990 against Majdi Mahjob, Boturs Jirjis, Orango and military members of Ramadan coup 1990[3].

The court decision caused outrage among the Sudanese public and human right activists, and they filed a petition to stop Rahama's execution. The Sudanese Writers Association also condemned his arrest and asked for either his release or to put him before a public trial, as he was not military and never participated in fights. In March 2013, he was released and could leave the country with his family.

Activists have written about Rahama on social media and Sudanese forums, condemning the court and talking about their experience with Rahama. Dalia Haj-Omar, a Sudanese Human Rights activist, tweeted "I worked with him and he is a true artist", Ali Haj, a former political editor of Ajras al-Hurriya and friend of Rahama said: "Officials don't have any charges against you and they don't tell you your rights."

In 2015, Rahama was given political asylum in France, where he has been giving lectures at schools and a poetry reading at the Institute for the Arabic World.

== Personal life ==
Rahama is married to an Ethiopian wife, and they have three children. In a recent interview with his wife, she said "there was no contact with him since his arrest and she feel astonish by his sentence, his 6 year-old daughter Dunya kept asking about him and I don't know what to tell her", also she said "I don't leave my house because am scared and worried about the safety of my children after a nearby house was raided by security forces thinking we live there" adding that she sought help from the UN refugee agency, the UNHCR. "I was interviewed, but they didn't offer any assistance.

== Works ==
Here is one of Rahama's famous poems, in which he describes a know figure in Sudan called 'Altaher Bushra', which can also be used to describe Rahama himself.

Discreet,
fidgeting in his own body
You really don't know, will he step inside his own shadow,
or breed in his sun.
Then he keeps throwing up his hands,
Optical arrangement,
to ward off the eye.
and to fall into suspicions
his eyes, gently, leaning on the earth
picking up the color with a blink of a heart
the soul gazes into him
and is called Altaher Bushra
