= Nissan N. Perez =

Israeli art historian

- ניסן פרץ
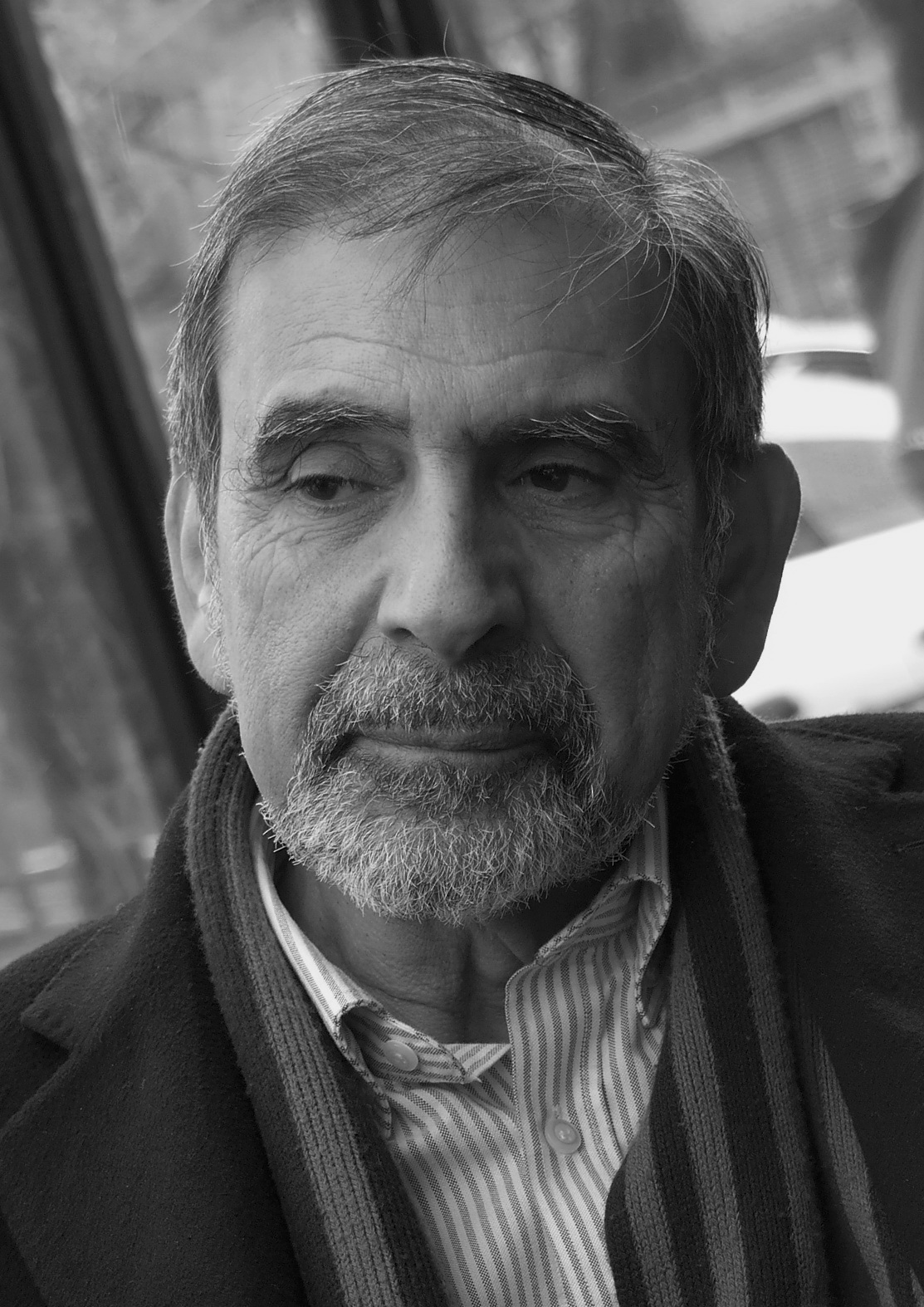
- Perez in 2014
- Born: December 18, 1946 (age 79); Istanbul, Turkey
- Years active: 1970–present
- Notable work: Displaced Visions: Émigré Photographers of the 20th Century; Revelation: Representations of Christ in Photography
- Spouse: Edna Jospe Perez (m. 1987)
- Website: nnperez.com (Official Website)

Dr. Nissan Nisso Perez (Hebrew: ניסן פרץ; born December 18, 1946) is a photography historian, researcher and curator. From 1977 until 2013, Perez was Chief Curator of the Noel and Harriette Levine Department of Photography at the Israel Museum, Jerusalem, which he conceived and founded. During his curatorial career, he planned and curated over 180 exhibitions in Israel and worldwide and published a substantial number of articles, catalogs and books.

== Selected photography exhibitions ==
- Dalia Amotz 1938-1994 (1995)
- Mendel John Diness: A Photographer in Jerusalem (1997)
- Harold Edgerton: In a Flash (1997)
- Time Frame: A Century of Photography in the Land of Israel (2000)
- Travelogue 1927: Photographs by Luciano Morpurgo in Mandatory Palestine (2001)
- Weegee's Story: A Photojournalist in the 1940s (2002)
- Revelation: Representations of Christ in Photography (2003)
- Old-New Land: Pioneers of Photography in Israel (2003)
- Camera Sacra: Capturing the Soul of Nature (2005)
- All That's Not Me: Kimiko Yoshida, Photographs (2006)
- Beyond Time: Photographs from the Gary B. Sokol Collection (2006)
- Engagement: Israeli Photography Now (2007)
- Picturing Jerusalem (2007)
- A Rare Gift: The Noel and Harriette Levine Collection of Photographs (2010)
- New in Photography: Recent Acquisitions (2010)
- Helmar Lerski: Working Hands, Photographs from the 1940s (2011)
- Eugene Atget: As Paris Was (2012)
- Double Take: The Tanenbaum and Willens Photography Collections (2013)
- Displaced Visions: Émigré Photographers of the 20th Century (2013)
- One Country Two Worlds. "5th International Photography Festival". Tel Aviv.

== Selected works ==
- Focus East: Early Photography in the Near East 1839-1885. New York: Harry N. Abrams, Inc., 1988.
- Displaced visions: Émigré photographers of the 20th century; [publ. in conjunction with the exhibition organized by and presented at The Israel Museum, Jerusalem, May 28 - September 20, 2013]. Jerusalem: The Israel Museum, 2013.
