= Black Dahlia (disambiguation) =

The Black Dahlia is a nickname given to 1940s murder victim Elizabeth Short.

Black Dahlia or The Black Dahlia may also refer to:

== Works based on the murder ==
- Who Is the Black Dahlia? (1975 TV movie)
- The Black Dahlia (novel), by James Ellroy
  - The Black Dahlia (film), a 2006 film by Brian De Palma based on the novel
  - The Black Dahlia (graphic novel), by Alexis Nolent and David Fincher, based on Ellroy's novel
- Black Dahlia, a 2006 film by Ulli Lommel
- Black Dahlia (video game), a 1998 computer adventure game

== Music ==
- The Black Dahlia Murder (band), a melodic death metal band
- "Black Dahlia" (song), a 2008 song by Hollywood Undead
- "Black Dahlia", a song by Anthrax from We've Come for You All
- The Black Dahlia, a 2001 jazz orchestral composition by Bob Belden
- "Black Dahlia", a song by Porcupine Tree from The Incident
- "Black Dahlia", a song by Angel Haze from Dirty Gold

== See also ==
- Black Dalia, a 2009 Indian film
- Blag Dahlia (born 1966), punk rock musician and lead singer of The Dwarves
- Dahlia (disambiguation)
- Black Dahlia, a character from the fighting game Skullgirls
- Sofia Black-D'Elia (born 1991), American actress
