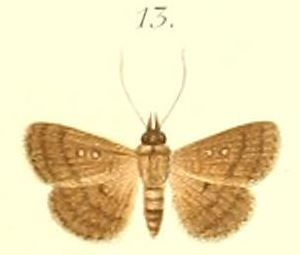

Scientific classification
- Kingdom: Animalia
- Phylum: Arthropoda
- Clade: Pancrustacea
- Class: Insecta
- Order: Lepidoptera
- Superfamily: Noctuoidea
- Family: Erebidae
- Genus: Dahlia
- Species: D. hesperioides

Binomial name
- Dahlia hesperioides Pagenstecher, 1900

= Dahlia hesperioides =

Species of moth

Dahlia hesperioides is a species of moth of the family Noctuidae first described by Arnold Pagenstecher in 1900. It is found on the Bismarck Archipelago of New Guinea.

It belongs to a group of families of the Lepidoptera order that have most characteristics of Heterocera but whose antennae are distinctly clubbed.
