= Badrunnesa Dalia =

Bangladeshi singer

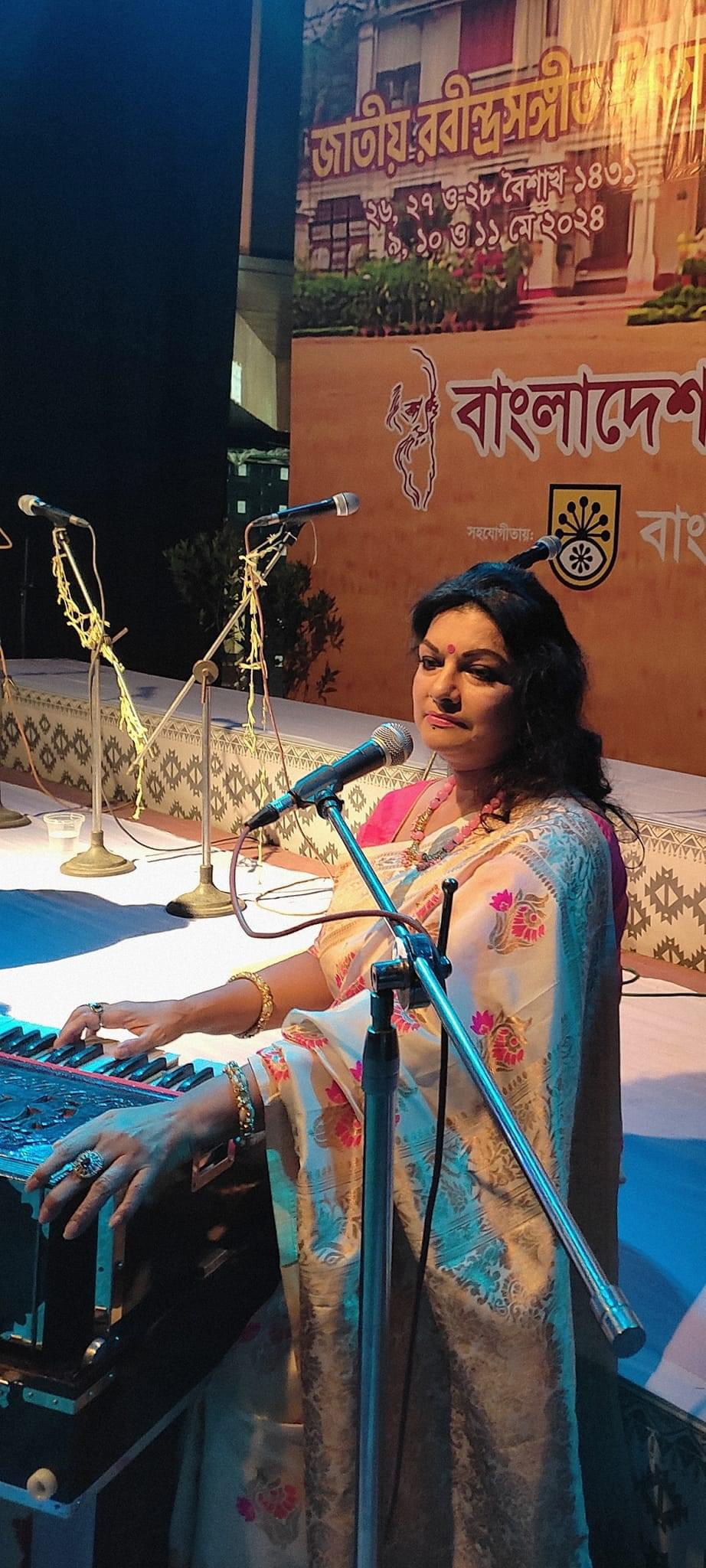
- Badrunnesa Dalia performing in Bangladesh Shilpkala Academy (2024)
- Born: March 1, 1970 (age 55); Narsingdi, Bangladesh
- Occupation: Singer
- Years active: 1983-present
- Spouse: Al-Nuri Faizur Reza (m. 1988-present)
- Children: Tamim Reza, Omer Reza
- Awards: Bangladesh Shishu Academy National Awards (1983,1984)

Badrunnesa Dalia (Bengali: বদরুন্নেসা ডালিয়া; known as Dalia) is a Bangladeshi mainstream Nazrul Sangeet and Rabindra Sangeet singer, performer and a music teacher. She is noted for her versatility as a multi-genre artist (singer).

== Early life and background ==
Dalia was born in Narsingdi in 1970. Her elder brother Asiful Huda is a cartoonist in Bangladesh. Her younger brother Sumon Rahat is also a singer. In 1988, Dalia married BCS bureaucrat Al-Nuri Faizur Reza. Dalia is a mother of two sons Tamim Reza and Omer Reza. She took lessons in classical music from Ustad Mofizul Islam and Abinash Goswami. Later, she learned Nazrul Sangeet from Sudhin Das and Sohrab Hossain.

== Career ==
Dalia has been a singer of Bangladesh Betar since 1996. She has been an enlisted artist of Bangladesh Television since 1988. She has performed as part of many programs organized by cultural organizations, institutions and academies in Bangladesh, including Bangla Academy, Shilpakala Academy, Chhayanaut, Nazrul Institute, Nazrul Academy, Nazrul Sangeet Shilpi Parishad (NSSP), Bangladesh Sangeet Sangathan Samannay Parishad (BSSSP), Srijon (a cultural organization), Bangladesh Rabindra Sangeet Shilpi Shangshad (BRSSS). On 23 October 2004, the national daily The Daily Star published a special feature under its culture page, titled "A rare passion for Nazrul and Rabindranath". She simultaneously practiced and performed both Nazrul Geeti and Rabindra Sangeet.

Dalia participated in a press conference arranged by the Artists' Organization of Bangladesh Television at Shilpakala Academy premises, making the demand for better treatment to save lives of two singers of Bangladesh- Sheikh Jomir Uddin and Madan Golap Dash.

Dalia has been a judge in various musical talent hunt reality shows, including the selection rounds of one named "BGMEA Gorbo".

== Performance highlights ==
Dalia performed in a musical program held at Begum Sufia Kamal Auditorium, Bangladesh National Museum titled "Pheley Asha Diner Gaan", in commemoration of the death of Rabindranath Tagore. In 2008 she performed a Kirtan- "Shokhi ami na hoy maan korechhinu" at the celebration program of the national poet Kazi Nazrul Islam in the Shawkat Osman Auditorium, Central Public Library (Dhaka). She sang "Moner rangey rangabo" and the SD Burman classic "Tumi esheychhiley porshu" in a program titled "Bijoy Ullash" held at Poet Sufia Kamal Auditorium, Bangladesh National Museum.

Dalia performed in Chhayanat's two-day festival, "Nazrul Utsab 1416" at the Chhayanat Sanskriti Bhaban in June 2009 on the occasion of president Sufia Kamal's birthday. She sang several solos at "Esho Bishwa Ke Melao Sur-er Oikotaan-e", an observance of the World Music Day 2011 at Bangladesh Shilpakala Academy. She also sang solos at the five-day festival titled "Nazrul Utsab 2011" on the 112th birth anniversary of national poet Kazi Nazrul Islam. also held at the Bangladesh Shilpakala Academy. and the following May at a two-day celebration marking the poet's 113th birth anniversary at the main auditorium of Chhayanat.

Along with other well-known artists in Bangladesh, Dalia performed in a program organized by the International Nazrul Practice Center at Shilpakala Academy in 2013. Later that year she sang a melancholic Rabindra Sangeet “Dibosho Rajoni” at Bangladesh Rabindra Sangeet Shilpi Shangshad's musical program and discussion at Shawkat Osman Memorial Auditorium of Central Public Library (Dhaka)

Dalia has performed in Bangladesh, India, and Morocco.

== Songs ==
Although she is of more noted as a live performer, Dalia has released solo albums, titled Shornali Shondhay (golden oldies) and Ektuku Chhnoya Lagey (Tagore songs). She has also released songs in many other mixed albums - “Laal Golap” (modern songs), “Oshru Jhora February”, “Jonmobhumi Ma” (patriotic songs).

== Awards ==
Dalia won the Bangladesh Shishu Academy National Awards twice in Nazrul Geeti (1983) and Rabindra Sangeet (1984).
