= Dalia Miniataitė =

Lithuanian politician

Personal details
- Born: 13 July 1961 (age 64) Vilnius, Lithuanian SSR, Soviet Union
- Party: Independent
- Education: Vilnius University

Dalia Miniataitė (born 13 July 1961) is a Lithuanian economist, civil servant and former Chancellor of the Ministry of Agriculture of Lithuania.

Ingrida Šimonytė originally planned to nominate Miniataitė to serve as Minister of Agriculture in her cabinet, but the nomination was rejected by Gitanas Nausėda.

== Early life ==
In 1979 he graduated from high school in Vilnius. In 1984 she graduated from Vilnius University with a degree in economic geography. From 1989 to 1992 she was a junior research associate at the Lithuanian Institute of Agrarian Economics, where she undertook postgraduate studies.

From 1992 to 1998 she worked as a Senior Specialist at the Cross-Border Relations Department of the Ministry of Agriculture of Lithuania. From 1994 to 1996, she served as Deputy Head of the International Trade Division and between 1996 and 1998 she headed the Department of Integration into the European Union of Ministry of Agriculture of Lithuania.

From 1998 to 2001 she served as Director of the Department of Agricultural and Food Industry Integration into the European Union under the Ministry of Agriculture of Lithuania.

From 2001 to 2004 she held the title of Deputy Minister of the Ministry of Agriculture of Lithuania. From 2004 to 2009 she was Secretary of the Ministry of Agriculture of Lithuania.

From 2009 to 2019 she served as the Chancellor of the Ministry of Agriculture of Lithuania.

== Sources ==
- https://www.lrt.lt/naujienos/lietuvoje/2/1283471/zemes-ukio-ministre-simonyte-siulys-dalia-miniataite
