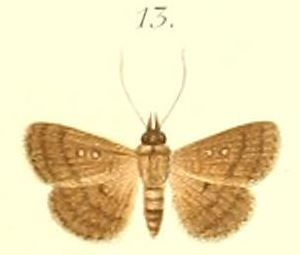
- Dahlia hesperioides

Scientific classification
- Kingdom: Animalia
- Phylum: Arthropoda
- Clade: Pancrustacea
- Class: Insecta
- Order: Lepidoptera
- Superfamily: Noctuoidea
- Family: Erebidae
- Subfamily: Calpinae
- Genus: Dahlia; Pagenstecher, 1900

= Dahlia (moth) =

Genus of moths

Dahlia is a genus of moths of the family Erebidae.

== Species ==
- Dahlia capnobela Turner, 1902
- Dahlia hesperioides Pagenstecher, 1900
