= Dalia River =

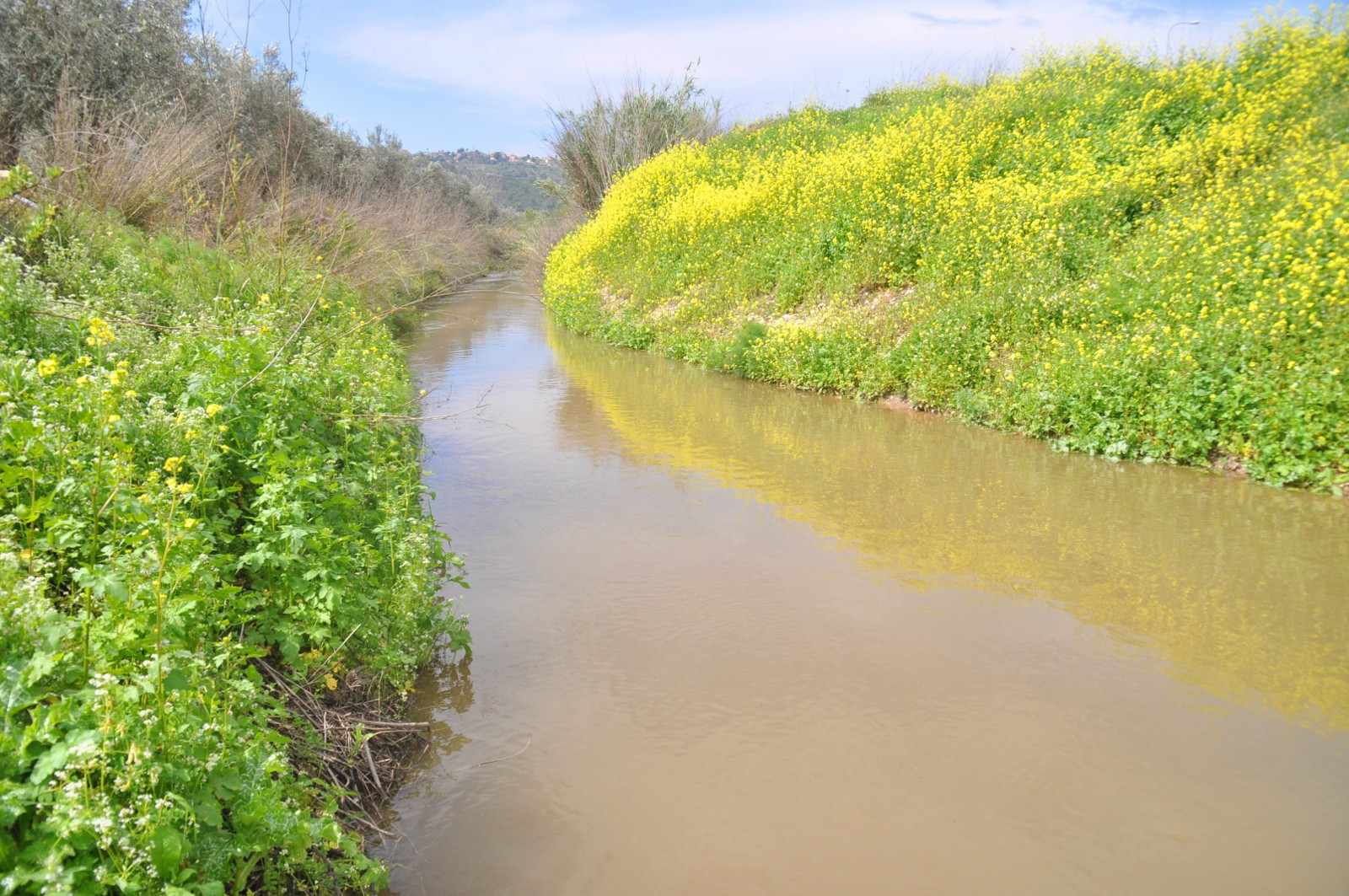

- Location of mouth
- Native name: נחל דליה (Hebrew)

Location
- Country: Israel
- District: Haifa District/Northern District

Physical characteristics
- Mouth: Mediterranean Sea
  - location: Zikhron Ya'akov
  - coordinates: 32°35′25″N 34°54′54″E
- Length: 17 km (11 mi)

The Dalia River (Hebrew: נחל דליה, Nachal Dalia) is a river in Israel that flows into the Mediterranean Sea near the city of Zikhron Ya'akov.

The Dalia River is a perennial stream in Northern Israel. Its source is near the Elyakim-Ein HaShofet road. After al-Furaidis junction it flows in a channel constructed to drain the wetlands surrounding it.

== See also ==
- List of rivers of Israel
