= Dalia Kuodytė =

Lithuanian politician (1962–2023)

Member of the Seimas
- In office 2008–2016

Personal details
- Born: 21 January 1962 Kaunas, Lithuanian SSR, USSR
- Died: 21 April 2023 (aged 61)
- Party: Liberals' Movement (until 2019)
- Education: Vilnius University
- Occupation: Historian

Dalia Kuodytė (21 January 1962 – 21 April 2023) was a Lithuanian historian and politician. As a historian, she specialized in the history of the Lithuanian independence movement, and as a politician, served in the Seimas for the Liberals' Movement party from 2008 to 2016. In 2019, she said that party mismanagement had prompted her to leave the Liberals' Movement party.
