= Dalia Marx =

Rabbi

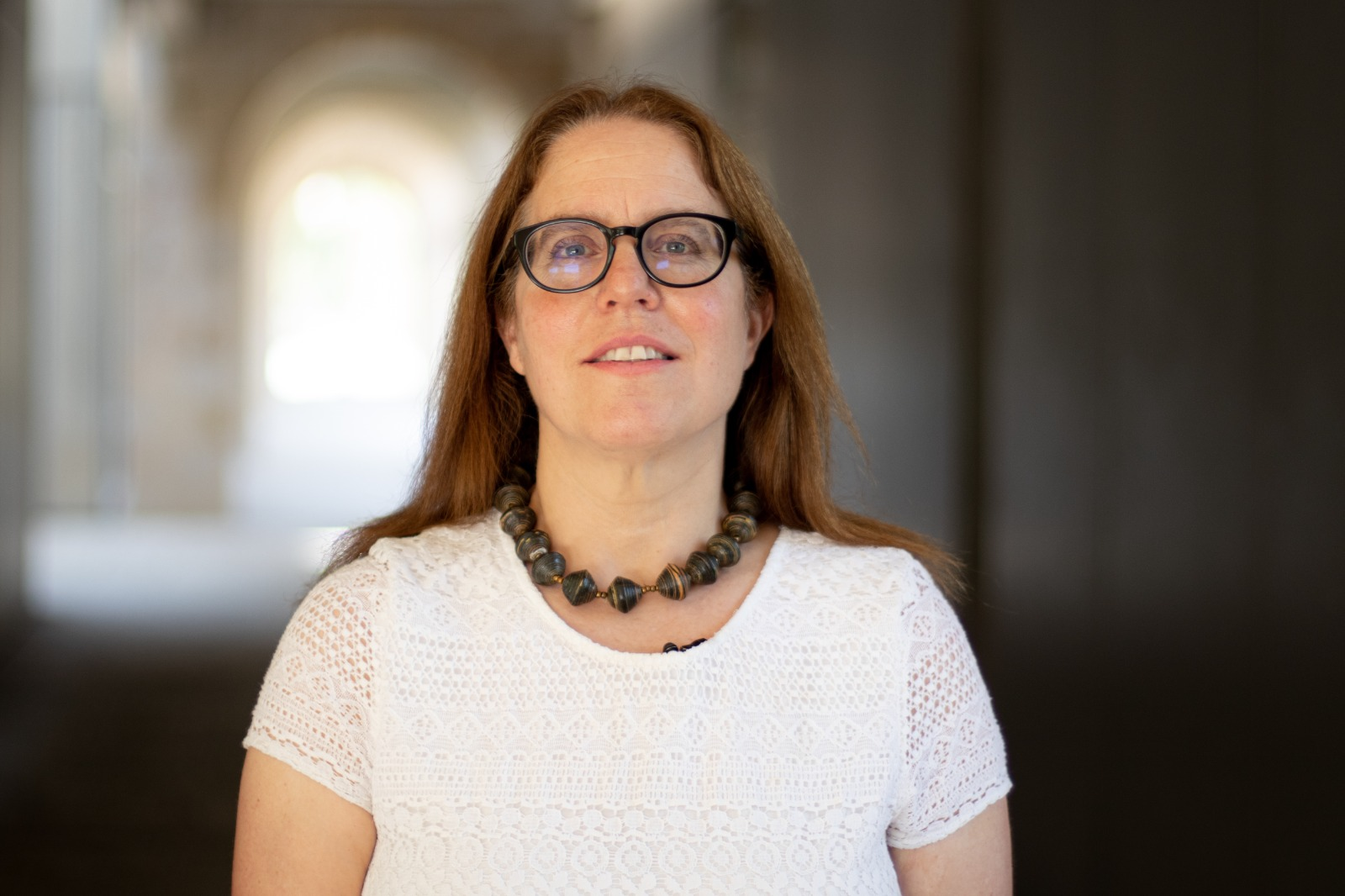
- Title: Professor of Liturgy and Midrash
- Website: dalia-marx.com

Rabbi Dalia Marx is Professor of Liturgy and Midrash at Hebrew Union College-JIR in Jerusalem.

== Life ==
Marx is a "tenth generation Jerusalemite".

She received her rabbinic ordination at HUC-JIR (Jerusalem and Cincinnati) in 2002 and earned her PhD at the Hebrew University in 2005.

== Publications ==
=== Books ===
- When I Sleep and When I Wake: On Prayers between Dusk and Dawn (2010)
- Tractates Tamid, Middot and Qinnim: A Feminist Commentary. Mohr Siebeck. 2013. ISBN 978-3-16-152496-7.
- Bazman (2018; also translated into German and Spanish)
  - Translated into English as From Time to Time: Journeys in the Jewish Calendar (2023)

=== Articles ===
- "When L’shon HaKodesh Is Also the Vernacular: The Development of Israeli Reform Liturgy", CCAR Journal, Fall 2009, pp. 31–62
- "The Morning Ritual (Birkhot Hashachar) in the Talmud: The Reconstructing of Body and Mind through the Blessings". Hebrew Union College Annual. 77: 103–129. 2008.
- "Influences of the Feminist Movement on Jewish Liturgy: The case of Israeli Reform Prayer". Sociological Papers. 14: 67–79. 2009.
- "Women and Priests: Encounters and Dangers, as reflected in I Sam 2:22". Lectio Dificilior. 1. 2011.
- Marx, D. (2013). The missing temple: The status of the temple in Jewish culture following its destruction. European Judaism, 46(2), 61–78.
- Dan Levene, Dalia Marx, Siam Bhayro, "'Gabriel is on their Right': Angelic Protection in Jewish Magic and Babylonian Lore"' Studia Mesopotamica 1 (2014) 185-198
- "Use of the Discarded Past to Create the Future: Renewal and Incorporation of the Old Eretz-Israel Rite in Contemporary Prayer Books". Jewish Studies Quarterly. 23: 345–373. 2016.

=== Chapters ===
- "Tractate Qinnim: Marginality or horizons: Introduction to Seder Qodashim: A Feminist Commentary of the Babylonian Talmud", V, Tal Ilan, Monika Brockhaus and Tanja Hidde, Tübingen 2012, 253–272.
- Stefan Reif; Renate Egger-Wenzel, eds. (2015). "The Prayer of Susanna (Daniel 13)". Ancient Jewish Prayers and Emotions. Berlin. pp. 221–238.
- Tudor Parfitt; Nethanel Fisher, eds. (2016). "Participation of Non-Jewish Family Members in Bar/Bat-Mitzvah Ceremonies in the American Reform Movement: Boundaries or Inclusion". Becoming Jewish: New Jews And Emerging Jewish Communities in Globalized Jewish World. Cambridge Scholars Publishing. pp. 353–368.
- Dana Even Kaplan, ed. (2017). "Reform Liturgy: Then and Now". Life of Meaning. New York: CCAR Press. pp. 349–368.
- Marjorie Lehman; Jane L. Kanarek; Simon J. Bronner, eds. (2017). "'Where was Sarah?' – Depictions of Mothers and Motherhood in Modern Israeli Poetry on the Binding of Isaac". Mothers in the Jewish Cultural Imagination. Liverpool: Littman Library of Jewish Civilisation. pp. 255–281.
- Lawrence Englander; Stanley David, eds. (2017). "Zion and Zionism In Reform Liturgy". Fragile Dialogue: The New Voices of Liberal Zionism. New York: CCAR Press. pp. 155–174.

== Recognition ==
- 2024 Women of Reform Judaism's Rabbi David Ellenson Hebrew Union College- Jewish Institute of Religion Faculty Award
