= Dalia Leinarte =

Lithuanian historian and human rights expert

Member of the United Nations Human Rights Committee (CCPR)
- In office 2025–present

Member of the United Nations Committee on the Elimination of Discrimination against Women
- In office 2013 – 2024 Chairperson of the CEDAW 2017-2018 Vice-Chairperson of the CEDAW 2015-2016

Personal details
- Born: October 25, 1958 (age 67)
- Education: Vilnius University
- Occupation: UN expert, historian, author

Dalia Leinarte (born 1958) is an international human rights expert and historian. In January 2025, as a joined candidate of the Baltic states, Leinarte was elected to the United Nations Human Rights Committee (CCPR) in by-elections held in New York. Leinarte is Fellow Commoner at Lucy Cavendish College, University of Cambridge. She also served to the UN Committee on the Elimination of Discrimination against Women (CEDAW). In 2018, Apolitical selected her as one of the 100 most influential people in gender policy around the world.

Leinarte graduated from Vilnius University and earned her PhD in history at Vytautas Magnus University in 1996. After obtaining habilitation in history (highest academic degree) she became full professor at Vilnius University in 2009.

== United Nations functions ==
Leinarte was designated and currently serves as UN Human Rights Committee's Special Rapporteur on follow-up to Views (monitors the implementation of the Committee’s decisions on the merits of individual cases under Optional Protocol). Before joining the Human Rights Committee, she served as Vice-Chair (2015-2016) and was elected as Chairperson of the CEDAW Committee in 2017.

During her terms in the CEDAW Committee Leinarte was a member of the Working Group on Individual Communications (2015-2016, 2019-2020) as well as member of the Working Group on Inquiries under the CEDAW Optional Protocol (2017-2018, 2023-2024).

She was also CEDAW Rapporteur on reprisals (2021-2024). Leinarte chaired the Working Group in charge of drafting the CEDAW General Recommendation No. 38 Trafficking in Women and Girls in the Context of Global Migration, which contextualized the implementation of the obligations of States Parties to combat all forms of trafficking. The General Recommendation No. 38 was adopted by the CEDAW Committee in 2020.

== Academic activities ==
Since 2014 she has been a Fellow Commoner at Lucy Cavendish College, University of Cambridge. She has been giving seminars in the graduate (LLM) course International Human Rights Law at the Law Faculty, University of Cambridge.

In 2017-2024 Leinarte was a senior researcher at the Faculty of Political Science and Diplomacy at Vytautas Magnus University, Lithuania.

She also served as a member of Advisory Board of the Arts and Humanities Research Council, Doctoral Training Programme, University of Cambridge (2014-2017).

In 2000-2017 Leinarte was Director of the Gender Studies Center at Vilnius University. She also served as Chair of the Academic Ethics Committee of the Senate at Vilnius University (2016-2017).

Leinarte was a research fellow of American Association of University Women (AAUW) at Idaho State University (2005-2006), and Fulbright research fellow at the State University of New York-Buffalo (2002-2003). In 2007–2009 she was visiting professor at Idaho State University, USA. Leinarte has written extensively about family, law and society covering Lithuanian history since 1795.

== Books ==
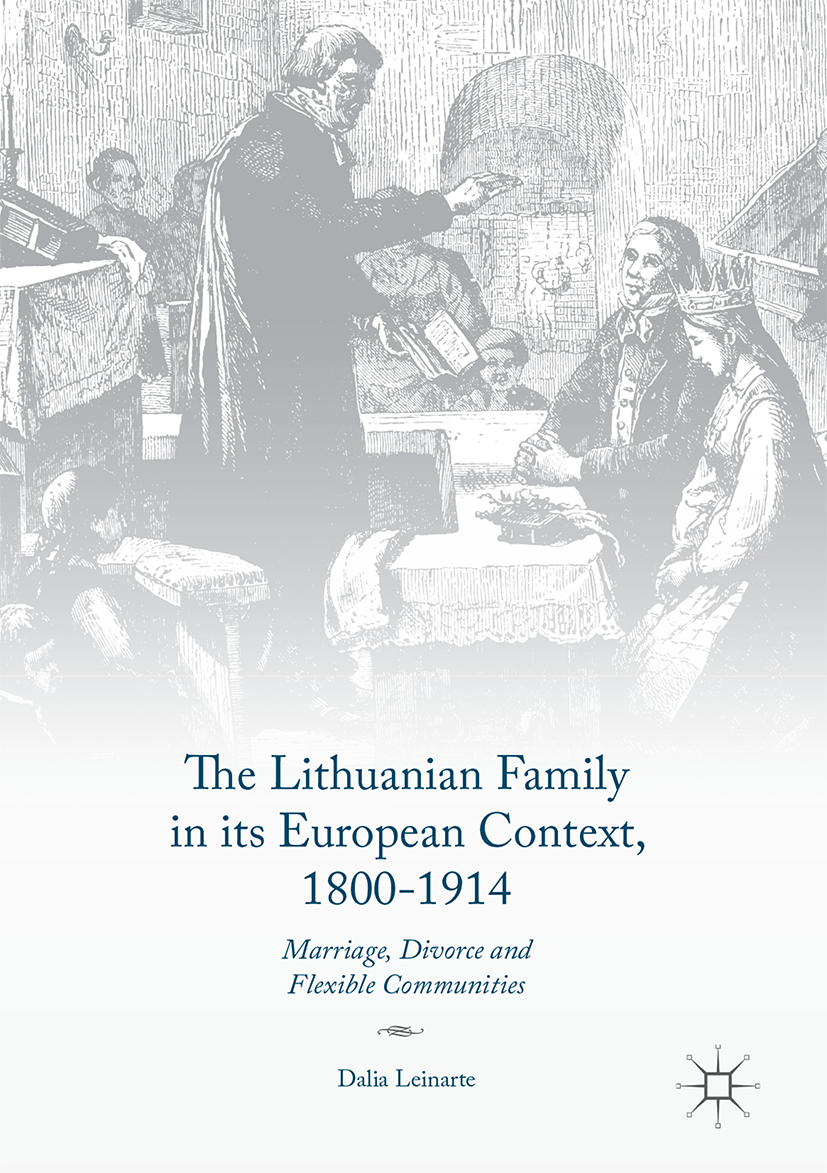
Book cover for "The Lithuanian Family in its European Context 1800-1914"(2017)

The Lithuanian Family in its European Context, 1800-1914. Marriage, Divorce and Flexible Communities investigates marriage and divorce in Lithuania in the period from 1800 to 1914, focusing on the interaction between authorized marital behaviour and independent individual choices.

Adopting and Remembering Soviet Reality. Life Stories of Lithuanian Women, 1945–1970 consists of ten interviews and two introductory essays: "Conducting Interviews in the Post-Soviet Space" and "Women, Work, and Family in Soviet Lithuania". The book recounts the experiences of Lithuanian women in the postwar years, during the so-called "Khrushchev Thaw" and the beginning of the "Stagnation Era". It explores the strategies these women used to reconcile the demands of work and family, as well as their perceptions of gender roles, marriage and romantic love in Soviet society.

Family and the State in Soviet Lithuania, based on over 100 interviews and an array of archival sources, this book analyses how family policy formed the everyday life of men and women and considers how the internalisation of Soviet ideology took place in the private sphere. From a well-developed after-school activity program for children to strict rules regarding the working hours of men and women, ultimately the family could not remain isolated from the regime. Family and the State in Soviet Lithuania is the first book to explore family policy in the Soviet Baltic states and is therefore a vital resource for scholars of Soviet and gender history.

== Awards and honors ==
- (2019)The Cross of Officer of the Order for Merits to Lithuania, bestowed by the President of the Republic of Lithuania Dalia Grybauskaitė.
- (2018) Association for the Advancement of Baltic Studies (AABS), Honorable mention for her book The Lithuanian Family in Its European Context, 1800-1914: Marriage, Divorce and Flexible Communities
- (2018) Gender Equality Top 100. The Most Influential People in Global Policy
- (2012) Women Inspiring Europe Award (European Institute for Gender Equality)
- (2010) Vilnius University Rector's Scientific Excellence Award
- (2005–2006) American Association of University Women, Research Scholar grant
- (2002-2003) FULBRIGHT Scholar grant, State University of New York
- (1998) International Women's Solidarity Award, Norway

== Selected works ==
Books:

- Dalia Leinarte. Family and the State in Soviet Lithuania. Gender, Law and Society. London: Bloomsbury Academic, 2021
- Dalia Leinarte. The Lithuanian Family in its European Context, 1800-1914: Marriage, Divorce and Flexible Communities. London: Palgrave Macmillan, 2017
- Cohabitation in Europe: a Revenge of History? Introduction & eds. Dalia Leinarte and Jan Kok. New York: Routledge, 2017
- The Soviet Past in the Post-Soviet Present, Introduction&eds. Melanie Ilic, Dalia Leinarte. New York: Routledge, 2015
- Dalia Leinarte Adopting and Remembering Soviet Reality: Life Stories of Lithuanian Women, 1945–1970. Amsterdam, New York: Brill, 2010

Articles:

- Dalia Leinarte. "Cohabitation in imperial Russia: the case of Lithuania". The History of the Family. 17(1), 2012
- Dalia Leinarte. "Nationalism and family ideology: The case of Lithuania at the turn of the 20th century". The History of the Family 11(2), 2006
