= Dalia Gallico =

University president and educator

- Occupation: Professor
- Known for: Art director, academic

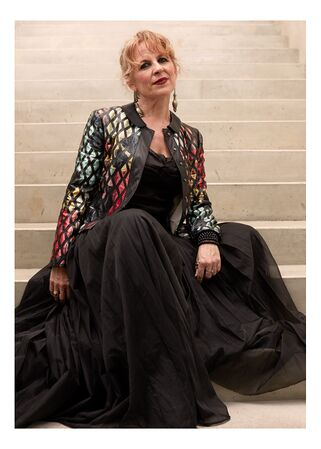
Profile

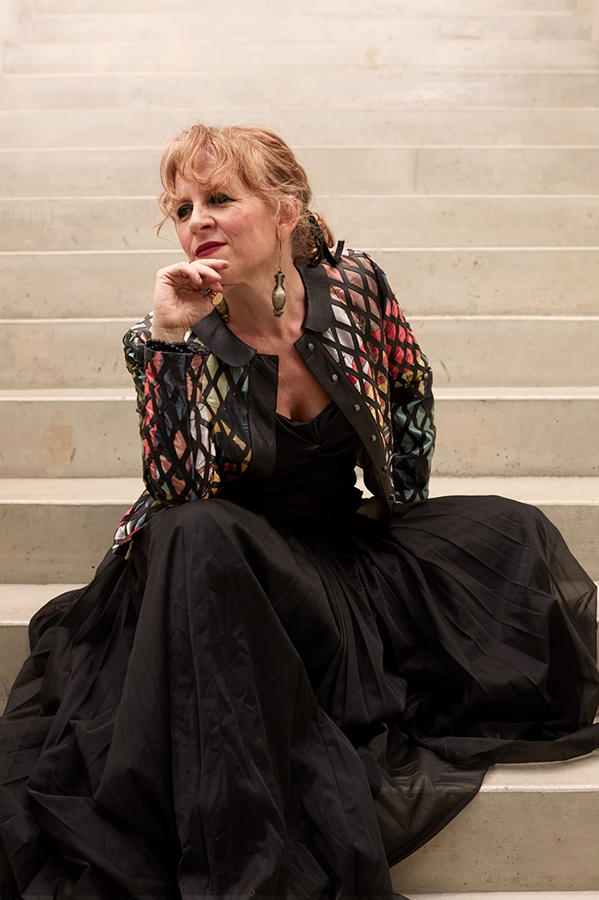

Dalia Gallico is an Italian author, professor, and art director at San Raffaele Telematic University Rome, where she is president of the degree program in fashion and design, in the faculty of architecture and design. She is also a researcher and has authored more than 131 research papers.

== Early life and education ==
Gallico graduated in Architecture from the Politecnico di Milano with a distinctive score in 1992. She completed the Biennial Course of International Specialization from La Scala Theater Academy in 1995 and pursued Specialized Course in Art and Culture along with training from SDA Bocconi in 1996.

She completed a Master of Specialization in Artistic Management from the Catholic University of Sacred Heart. In 1997, she completed Refresher Course at the Master of Research and Development of Artistic and Cultural Heritage from the Scuola Normale Superiore di Pisa.

== Career ==
In 1993, Gallico started her career as a costume designer at La Scala.

In 1998, she joined the National Chamber of Italian Fashion as a training director. She was a professor at Brera Academy of Fine Arts and Politecnico di Milano from 1999 to 2004 and 2001 to 2010, respectively.

She has worked as an associate professor at Central Academy of Fine Arts (CAFA) since 2012 and at San Raffaele University, Rome.

She has been president of various notable institutions, including ADI Lombardia Industrial Design Association, San Raffaele Telematic University Rome since 2008, and ArtLab ETS Association since 2012. She served as art director for Palazzo Reale in Milan [9] from 2004 to 2020 and has been working as the director of training and employment services since 2012, Scientific Director of "Istituto del Colore" and Colore magazine since 2015, and United Towns Agency ONU- Italy since 2021.

== Publications ==
1. Gallico D (2018) Made In Italy. An Integrated E-Commerce And E-Learning Innovative Platform To Promote Education For Italian Design System (Product & Process). 11th International Conference on ICT, Society, and Human Beings. Madrid, Spain. ISBN 978-989-8533-77-7
2. Gallico D (2018) Upgraded Sustainability, Inclusiveness, And Value Addition Of The Cotton Value Chain. Collaborative innovation between Italy and Egypt about sustainability. International conference on sustainability, technology, and education. Hong Kong. IADIS International Association for Development of the Information Society. ISBN 978-989-8533-84-5
3. Gallico D (2017) C2C. Cradle To Cradle. Modelli, Progetti, Prodotti Sostenibili. Chi e come esprime oggi il meglio nei mondi design, fashion e food. Un panorama internazionale Lunghezza stampa: 211 pagine Editore: Fausto Lupetti
4. Gallico D (2017) Apprendere Per Vivere Giocando. Metodologia progettuale per un design responsabile (Lupetti Editore )
5. Gallico D (2016). Rapporto Sul Design Nelle Impresse Italiane Dalla A Alla Z (Lupetti Editore )
6. Gallico D. (2015) E-learning sustainability: creating a new platform for designing new community identity through lifelong learning. World Review Of Science, Technology, And Sustainable Development
