= The Blue Dahlia (disambiguation) =

The Blue Dahlia is a 1946 film noir starring Alan Ladd and Veronica Lake.

(The) Blue Dahlia may also refer to:

- The Blue Dahlia (ballet), a ballet first presented in Russia in 1860
- The Blue Dahlia, a jazz band featuring Athan Maroulis, and the band's 2000 album
- "Blue Dahlia", a song by the Gaslight Anthem from Handwritten (The Gaslight Anthem album)
- "Blue Dahlia", a song by Luke Doucet from Aloha, Manitoba
- Blue Dahlia, a work by Nora Roberts

== See also ==
- Dahlia § Cultivation for a long-standing prize for breeding a blue dahlia
