= Dahlia (given name) =

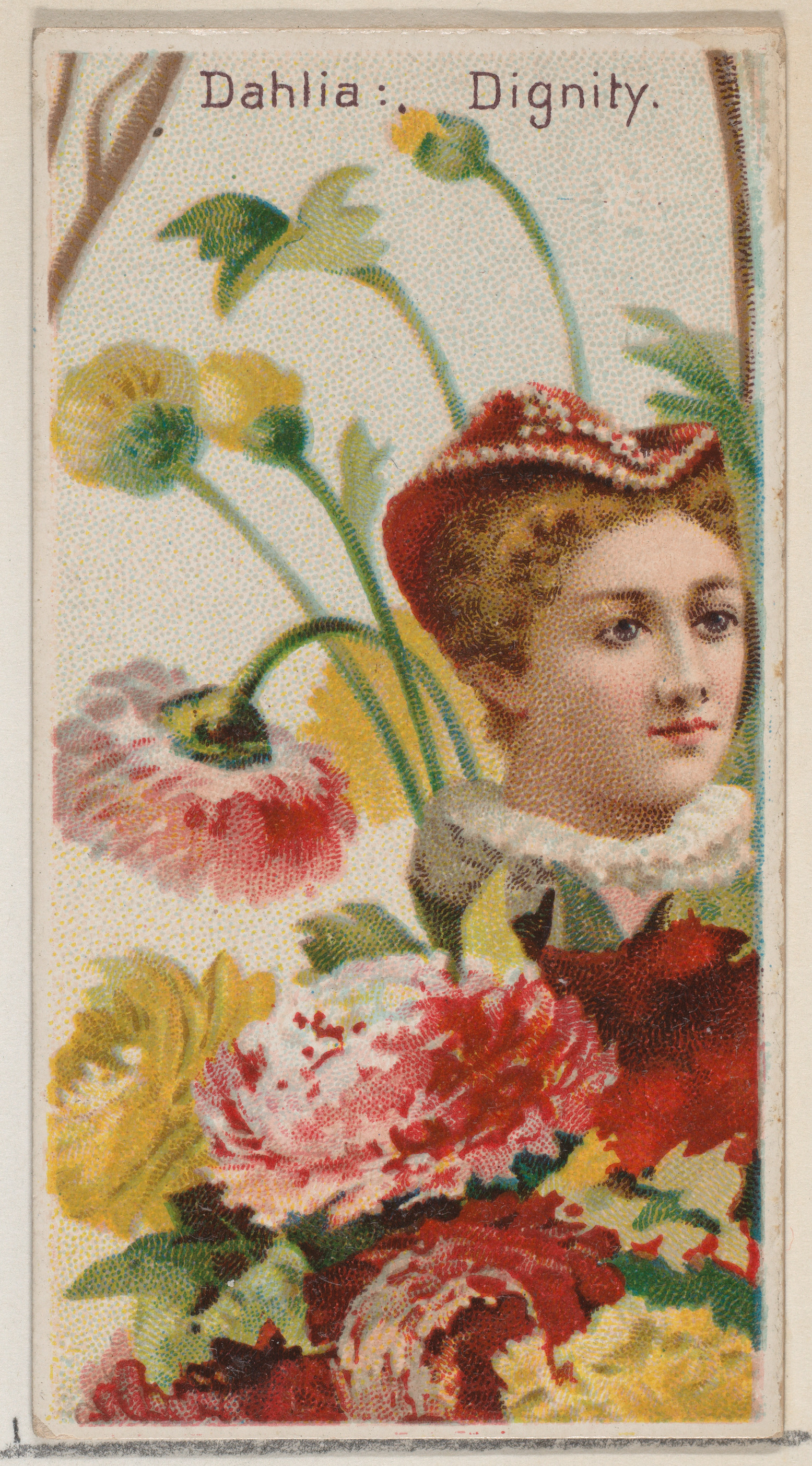
- The dahlia, when given as a gift, is said to signify dignity in the language of flowers.
- Gender: Female
- Language: English

Origin
- Meaning: Dahlia or spelling variant of Dalia

Dahlia is a feminine given name derived from the name for the flower, which was named in honor of the Swedish botanist Anders Dahl. His surname is of Germanic origin and refers to a person who lived in a valley. It is also a spelling variant of the name Dalia, which is also a Hebrew name meaning “hanging branch”.

== Usage ==
The name has been among the top 1,000 names given to newborn girls in the United States since 2006 and among the top 300 since 2022. It has been among the top 1,000 names given to newborn girls in England and Wales since 2013. It is among the top 300 names given to newborn girls in Canada, where it ranked in 294th position on the popularity chart in 2021, with 106 uses.

== People ==
- Dahlia Adler, American author
- Dhalia, Indonesian actress
- Dahlia Duhaney (born 1970), Jamaican retired sprinter and Olympian
- Dahlia Elsayed (born 1969), American painter, writer, and teaching artist
- Dahlia Greidinger (1926–1979), Israeli scientist
- Dahlia Harris, Jamaican actress, television and radio personality, public speaker, and film and theatre director
- Dahlia Lithwick, Canadian-American lawyer, writer, and journalist
- Dahlia Malkhi, Israeli-American computer scientist
- Dahlia Mokbel (born 1969), Egyptian synchronized swimmer and Olympian
- Dahlia Ravikovitch (1936–2005), Israeli poet, translator, and peace activist
- Dahlia Salah (born 2001), Gibraltarian footballer
- Dahlia Salem (born 1971), American actress
- Dahlia Schweitzer (born 1976), American pop culture critic and writer

== Fictional characters ==
- Aunt Dahlia, a recurring character in the Jeeves stories of English comic writer P. G. Wodehouse

== See also ==
- Blag Dahlia, stage name of American singer and record producer Paul Cafaro (born 1969)
- Kat Dahlia, stage name of Cuban-American recording artist Katriana Huguet (born 1990)
- Dahlia Sin, American drag performer
- Dahlia (horse), an American-bred Thoroughbred racing horse and brood mare
