= Dalia Dassa Kaye =

American political scientist

- Education: University of California, Berkeley
- Occupations: Academic, think tanker
- Known for: Director of the Center for Middle East Public Policy at the RAND Corporation

Dalia Dassa Kaye is an American academic. She was the Director of the Center for Middle East Public Policy at the RAND Corporation in Santa Monica, California.

== Early life ==
Dalia Dassa Kaye received a PhD in political science from the University of California, Berkeley.

== Career ==
Kaye was an assistant professor of Political Science and International Affairs at the George Washington University from 1998 to 2003. She was a visiting professor at the University of Amsterdam and was a visiting scholar at the Netherlands Institute of International Relations. She was an International Affairs Fellow at the Dutch Foreign Ministry on behalf of the Council on Foreign Relations. She was also a Foreign Policy Studies Fellow at the Brookings Institution. She was a visiting professor at the Ronald W. Burkle Center for International Relations and the International Institute at the University of California, Los Angeles (UCLA).

Kaye also served as the Director of the Center for Middle East Public Policy at the RAND Corporation.

She has published two books, monographs, and articles in Foreign Affairs. Her first book, Beyond the Handshake: Multilateral Cooperation in the Arab-Israeli Peace Process, talked about the way the Madrid Conference of 1991 was instrumental for the Israeli–Palestinian peace process.

=== Views on Iran ===
In 2011, she suggested it would be a bad idea to bomb Iran in retaliation for their attempted assassination of the Saudi ambassador to the United States on U.S. soil in Washington, D.C. In 2012, she opined it would be an equally bad idea for Israel to bomb Iran's nuclear facilities. In 2014, she renewed her support for a nuclear deal with Iran. Later that year, she professed, "the Israelis probably have less to worry about regarding a nuclear deal with Iran than they might think." A year later, in 2015, she wrote a piece about the possibility of failure of such a deal urging caution.

== Bibliography ==
- Beyond the Handshake: Multilateral Cooperation in the Arab-Israeli Peace Process (New York City: Columbia University Press, 2001).
- Talking to the Enemy: Track Two Diplomacy in the Middle East and South Asia (Santa Monica, California: RAND Corporation, 2007).
