= Dalia Dokšaitė =

Lithuanian painter

- Born: 4 May 1955; Vilnius, Lithuania
- Known for: Painting, Drawing
- Notable work: Japan. Season; Lithuania; Nerija
- Movement: Ink wash technique
- Website: www.daliadoksaite.com

Dalia Dokšaitė (born 4 May 1955) is a Lithuanian painter who uses the ink wash technique. Dokšaitė has held personal exhibitions at various galleries, including the Kawamura Memorial Art Museum in Japan and the exhibition gallery of the Lithuanian Seimas.

== Writing ==
- "The Monochromatic ZEN Painting sumi-e in Japan", Indra, 2000.
- "The Place Where Samogitians Get Their Strength, or How Are We Like the Japanese?", Žemaičių Žemė.

== Implemented educational projects ==
- "Art to Children"
- "The Language of Symbols in Lithuanian Art"
- "The Secrets of Watercolour"
- "The Path of the Sun"
