= Dalia Hertz =

Israeli poet (born 1942)

Dalia Hertz (Hebrew: דליה הרץ; born 1942, Tel Aviv) is an Israeli poet.

Hertz received an MA in philosophy from Tel Aviv University. She taught philosophy for several years. She edited and presented literary programs on Israel Radio, published two books of poetry, and wrote three plays. One of these plays, Louise, became an opera with music by Israeli composer Menahem Avidom.

Her very first book of poetry was published in 1961.
