= USS Dahlia =

American Civil War-era tugboat

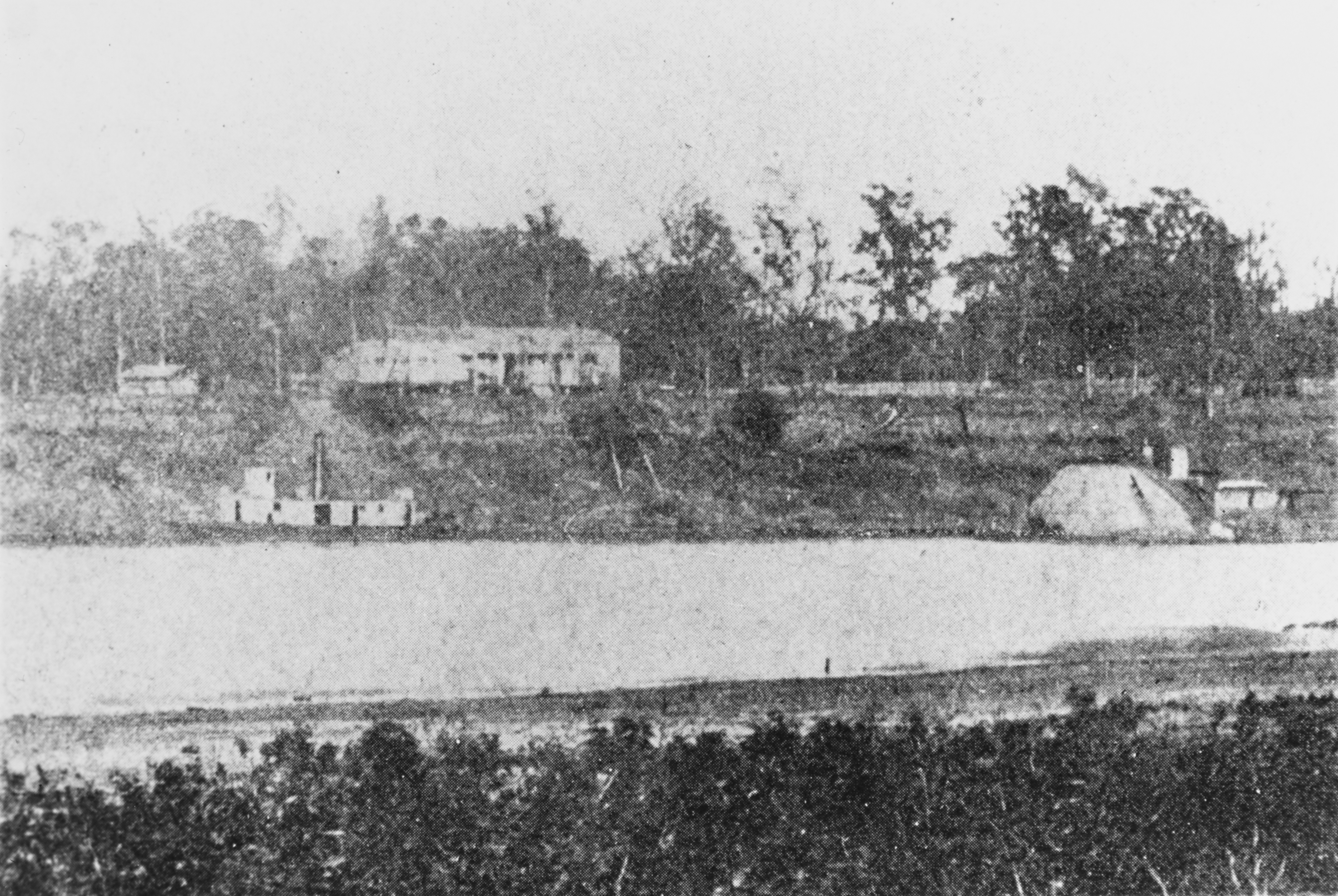
- Moored to the river bank above the falls at Alexandria, Louisiana, during the Red River campaign, circa May 1864. USS Dahlia is at left, and USS Neosho is at right.

History

United States
- Namesake: genus of flowers of the aster family.
- Ordered: as Firefly
- Builder: U.S. Army
- Laid down: 1861
- Launched: 1862 at St. Louis, Missouri
- Acquired: 1 October 1862
- Commissioned: circa 24 October 1862
- Stricken: 1965 (est.)
- Fate: Sold 17 August 1865 at Mound City, Illinois
- Notes: Retained in commercial service until about 1872

General characteristics
- Displacement: 50 tons
- Length: not known
- Beam: not known
- Draft: 6 ft (1.8 m)
- Propulsion: steam engine, paddle-wheel driven
- Speed: 10 knots
- Complement: not known
- Armament: not known

USS Dahlia was a paddle-wheel tugboat acquired by the Union Navy during the beginning of the American Civil War. Dahlia was assigned to the Mississippi River area to provide tug and other services to Union ships requiring assistance.

== Built for the U.S. Army ==
Firefly was built by the United States Army at St. Louis, Missouri in 1862; turned over to the Navy 1 October 1862; and named Dahlia 24 October 1862.

== Civil War service ==
Assigned to the Mississippi River Squadron under Rear Admiral David Dixon Porter. She provided tug services in the Mississippi River and its tributaries until 17 August 1865.

== Post-war disposition ==
Dahlia was sold at Mound City, Illinois in August 1865. She retained her name as a civilian ship after the war and passed out of service in about 1872.
