= Dalia (singer) =

Egyptian singer

- Born: Mansoura
- Citizenship: Egypt
- Occupation: Singer

Dalia (Arabic :داليا) is an Egyptian singer born in Al Mansoura, Egypt.

After being discovered by Egyptian songwriter Jamal Salameh, she sang as a guest on several songs on Hameed Al-Shaeri's 1994 album, Hodoa Moaqat, which helped launch her solo career.

Singles with Al-Shaeri, Ehab Tawfeeq, and Kuwaiti actor and singer Ahmad Johar followed. Dalia sang in the Egyptian musical El-Qods Ha Tergaa Lena. Her first album in 1998 was well received, but a second album in 1999 failed to mark the move to a solo career.

== Discography ==
Albums:

- Bahebak enta 1998 ( بحبك انت )
- Mograma 1999 (مغرمة)
