= Dalia Haj-Omar =

Sudanese human rights activist

- Education: Johns Hopkins University; University of Notre Dame
- Occupation: Human Rights activist

Dalia Haj-Omar (sometimes written Haj Omar) is a Sudanese human rights activist and conflict management expert who has worked extensively in the Middle East and Africa. She has managed, designed, monitored, and evaluated United States Agency for International Development/Office of Transition Initiatives-funded projects in Sudan, and has been officially identified as a Senior Development Officer at Development Alternatives, Inc., and as being associated with GIRIFNA, the Sudanese Non-Violent Resistance Movement. She has also worked with Human Rights Watch, Doctors Without Borders, UNICEF, The World Bank, and Chemonics. Her reportage and opinion pieces have appeared in such publications as The New York Times and Foreign Affairs.

Haj-Omar is based in France. According to one source, "she felt she had to leave" Sudan "because the regime was watching her work." She speaks Arabic and English and is proficient in French.

== Education ==
She holds an M.A. in International Development and Development Economics from Johns Hopkins University and an M.A. in International Peace Studies from the University of Notre Dame.

== Activism and writing ==
Haj-Omar wrote in June 2009 that "Iran's Green Revolution shows that freedom and citizenship rights are universal and that even an Islamic regime that came through legitimate elections can be questioned and rejected by those who put it in power." Nonetheless, "Sudan is very far from Iran's political context and from having political institutions that function."

In a March 2010 article, Haj-Omar lamented that Sudan did "not look like a country preparing for its first national elections in 24 years," given the continued censorship of newspapers and the "complete absence of public campaigning by political parties." Noting that the political environment was "highly restrictive," she maintained that "the ruling party must open up the political space to all key participants," or else "the election will suffer a severe lack of credibility even before it takes place." She cited critical statements by the ruling National Congress Party (NCP) about foreign assistance from the U.S. and Norwegian Church Aid as evidence that “the NCP is trying to appeal to the sentiments of Sudanese people by depicting Western or ‘foreign’ intervention as a sign that the country is under attack — and that they are the party best suited to protecting the country's sovereignty.” She acknowledged that the election was no “magic pill,” but added that “an election conducted in a transparent and just manner is likely to shift the country away from election-related violence and toward a peaceful transition to democracy.”

Haj-Omar wrote for the TechChange website in October 2011 on the subject “What are Sudanese Youth Learning from Online Activism?”

She argued in an October 2011 article that the current period of Sudanese history, beginning with the ascension to power of the National Congress Party, was “the darkest, not just for Sudanese citizens but for humanity as whole,” given that “after Hitler, Stalin and Mao it is Omar Al Bashir that has presided over the largest massacre in the history of mankind.” Nonetheless, many Sudanese see no alternative, their minds having been closed “in a box forbidding them to think critically and creatively[,] especially when it comes to questioning the relationship between the state and religion.”

Haj-Omar wrote in The New York Times on March 1, 2012, that Sudan's ruling regime “cares only about maintaining its grip on power” and would thus “do anything to crush the new rebellion in the Nuba Mountains.” She called on the U.S. to “weigh the costs and benefits of its collaboration with the N.C.P. on national security and anti-terrorism issues, and consider a more serious and committed dialogue with Sudan's opposition groups about a future without the N.C.P.”

Writing on September 16, 2013, about the August 27 arrest by the Public Order Police (POP) of activist and engineer Amira Osman “for refusing to pull up her head-scarf,” Haj-Omar noted that the POP were a product of the so-called “Civilization Project,” a government Islamization program “that reached into every aspect of Sudanese social life, and placed restrictions on long entrenched traditional norms such as private parties with music, mixing between the sexes and the making and consumption of alcohol.” The worst of these restrictions were those on women's clothing, maintained Haj-Omar, who stated that things had only grown worse since the 2011 separation of South Sudan.

Haj-Omar admitted in a November 11, 2013, article that she and other regime opponents had previously been unprepared “for the scale of protest needed to effectively call for regime change,” the “popular revolt” of late September 2013 had “shifted the power dynamics in Sudan,” with the government's efforts to suppress resistance causing public rage to mount. Although the U.S., E.U., U.N., and other governments had condemned Khartoum’s brutality toward protesters, “the international community,” maintained Haj-Omar, seemed “to not be learning from its long engagement with Sudan,” in that it continued “to engage only at the level of cosmetic crisis management,” rewarding the NCP “for a half-hearted implementation” of the Comprehensive Peace Agreement (CPA).

In a November 14, 2013, interview, Haj-Omar noted that the “level of participation” in recent Sudan protests had “shocked the government,” because what had been “a youth-based protest movement” was now “a grassroots movement throughout the country,” with higher anger levels. “They thought they could scare people by using violence, but it turned out this really angered people,” she said.

“The real triumph of Sudan’s regime,” Haj-Omar wrote in March 2014, “has been that it has disconnected citizens by making their stories invisible to each other, and hence their suffering is also diminished; and with that our collective humanity. We therefore need a national exercise in regaining our humanity and recognizing the other. And this cannot be done without giving marginalized groups, and especially those enduring state-sponsored wars, the space to tell their narratives in the way they choose to.” She said that this aspect of the Sudanese struggle “is where we part ways with the recent revolutions in the Arab region,” because there is “an ethnic/racial divide is unique to Sudan.” Thus “the biggest challenge facing today’s generation of changemakers is how to create an inclusive pro-democracy movement that addresses the grievances of all Sudanese rather than falling hostage to rigid ideological and sometimes utopian thinking.”

=== Book reviews and commentary ===
On May 23, 2013, she reviewed Nigerian author Chimamanda Ngozi Adichie’s novel Americanah, saying that it would “strike a chord with a wide range of readers because it defines the psyche of multiple generations from the African continent – from our own Sudan, including those who left, those who stayed and those who returned after long years abroad.”

In a July 2013 review of Amir Ahmad Nasr's book My Isl@m: How Fundamentalism Stole My Mind-and Doubt Freed My Soul, Haj-Omar called it an example of the fact that a new generation in Sudan was finally discussing “the relationship between Islam and identity.” Noting his discussion of how an Islam of “reason” and “free will” lost out to an Islam of “tradition” and Qur'anic literalism, she called his book “a gift to the generation that grew under the darkness of Sudan's murderous regime (whether inside or outside Sudan), the National Congress Party. It is a song to freedom of expression, freedom of thought and critical inquiry, and freedom from organized religion. It will shake the foundations of many Muslims who have never been exposed to Islamic or Western philosophy; it will create a stir in a closed society like Sudan where the debate on religion, the secular state, and identity has been stunted.”

== Other professional activities ==
Haj-Omar sat on a panel about crowdfunding at RightsCon in Silicon Valley in March 2014, and was scheduled to speak at the Oslo Freedom Forum in May 2014.

== Social media ==
Haj-Omar tweets frequently at @daloya, writing on May 2, 2014, for instance: “if we were a failed state before, what are we now?” She blogs at “Thoughts, Hopes, and Speculations” and also at “The Udhiya Project (مشروع الأضحية)”.

== See also ==
- Islamization of the Sudan region
