= Dalia Amotz =

Israeli photographer (1938–1994)

Dalia Amotz דליה אמוץ
- Born: 12 August 1938; Kibbutz Gan Shmuel, Mandatory Palestine
- Died: 27 November 1994 (aged 56); Kibbutz Gan Shmuel, Israel
- Known for: Photographer
- Movement: Israeli art

Dalia Amotz (Hebrew: דליה אמוץ; 12 August 1938 - 27 November 1994) was an Israeli photographer.

== Biography ==
Dalia Amotz, born in Kibbutz Gan Shmuel, she moved to Jerusalem from 1962. She was the daughter of Yaffa and Isaac Gleicher. In 1973 she presented her first solo exhibition, entitled "Dir Samit". In 1990 she won an Oscar Handler Prize from the Ghetto Fighters' Kibbutz. In 2000, an exhibition of her works was held at the Tel Aviv Museum of Art entitled "The Dark Land, Fields of Light" as part her posthumously receiving the Constantiner Prize.

She died in 1994.

== Collections ==
Dalia Amotz works are part of Israel Museum in Jerusalem.

== Awards and recognition ==
- 1977 The Enrique Kavlin Photography Prize, The Israel Museum, Jerusalem
- 1990 Oskar Handler Award, Ghetto Fighters' House
- 2000 The Constantiner Photography Award for an Israeli Artist, Tel Aviv Museum of Art

== See also ==
Visual arts in Israel
