= Rishonim =

Rabbis and poskim of the 11th–15th centuries

Rishonim (Hebrew: [ʁiʃoˈnim]; Hebrew: ראשונים, lit. 'the first ones'; sing. ראשון, Rishon) were the leading rabbis and poskim who lived approximately during the 11th to 15th centuries, in the era before the writing of the Shulchan Aruch (שׁוּלחָן עָרוּך, "Set Table", a common printed code of Jewish law, 1563 CE) and following the Geonim (589–1038 CE). Rabbinic scholars subsequent to the Shulchan Aruch are generally known as acharonim ("the latter ones").

The distinction between the Rishonim and the Geonim is meaningful historically; in halakha (Jewish law) the distinction is less important. According to a widely held view in Orthodox Judaism, the Acharonim generally cannot dispute the rulings of rabbis of previous eras unless they find support from other rabbis in previous eras. On the other hand, this view is not formally a part of halakha itself, and according to some rabbis is a violation of the halakhic system. In The Principles of Jewish Law, Orthodox rabbi Menachem Elon writes that:

[such a view] "inherently violates the precept of Hilkheta Ke-Vatra'ei, that is, the law is according to the later scholars. This rule dates from the Geonic period. It laid down that until the time of Rabbis Abbaye and Rava (4th century) the halakha was to be decided according to the views of the earlier scholars, but from that time onward, the halakhic opinions of post-talmudic scholars would prevail over the contrary opinions of a previous generation.

== List of Rishonim ==
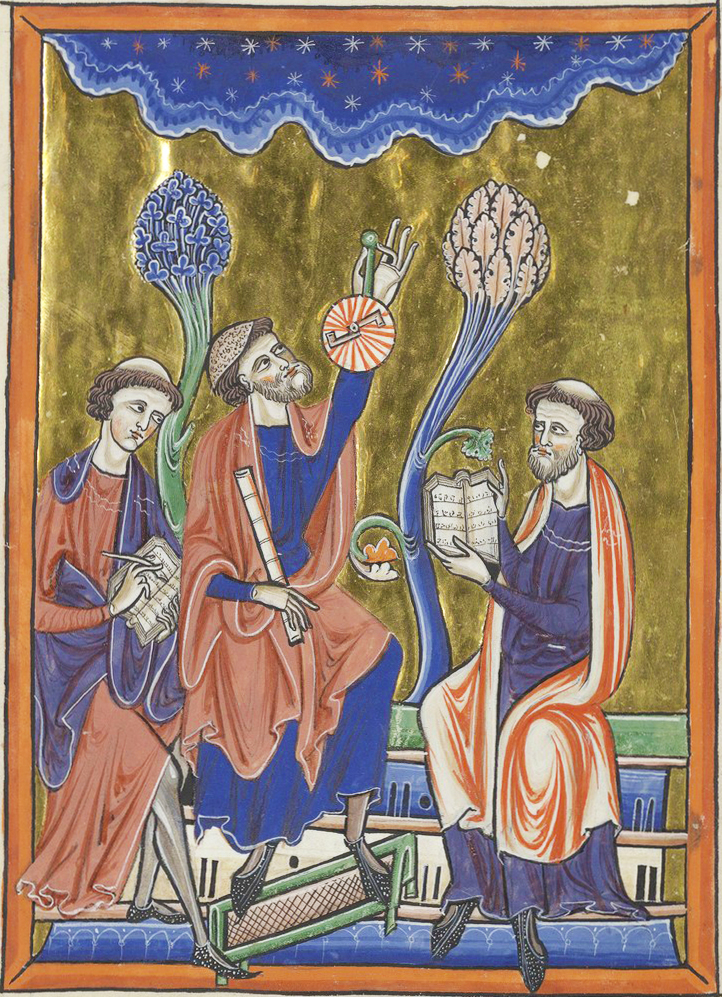
Abraham Ibn Ezra (center)

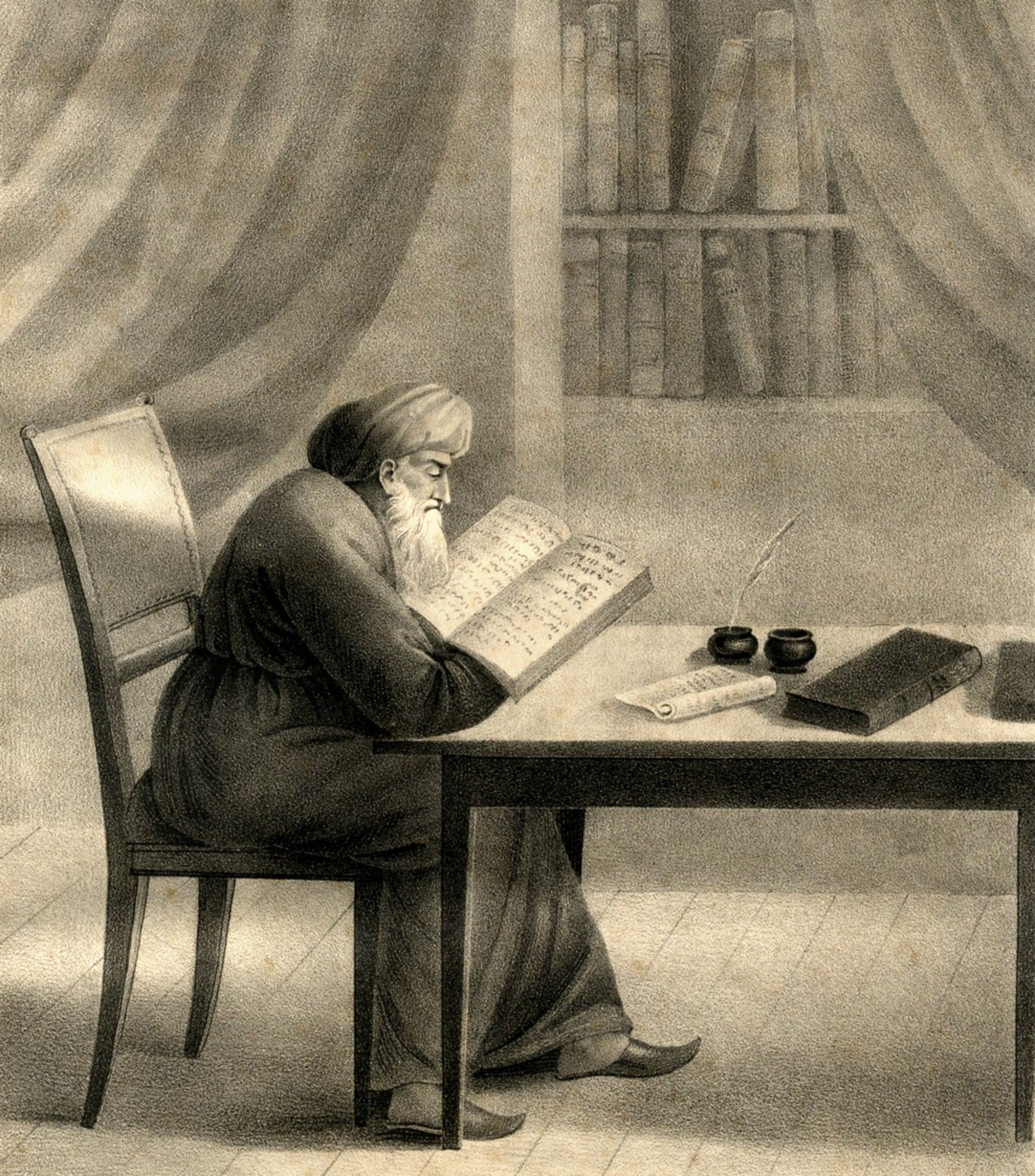
Isaac Alfasi

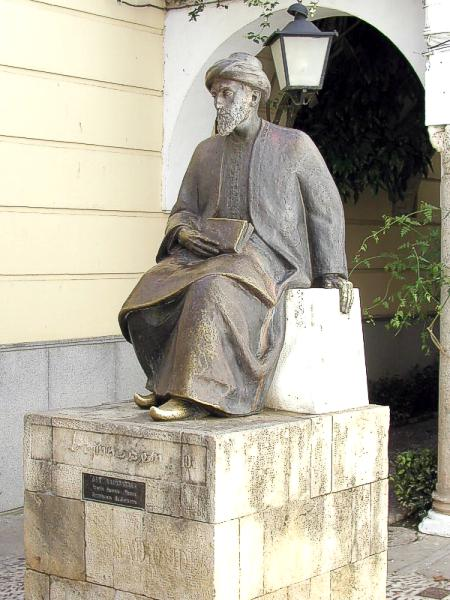
Maimonides' statue in Córdoba

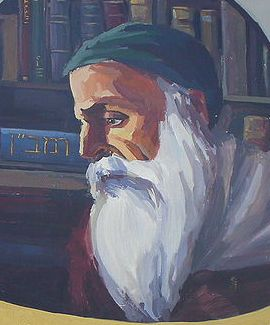
Nachmanides

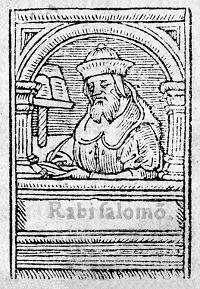
Rashi

=== 11th century ===
- Menahem ben Helbo, 11th-century French tosafist and exegete
- Isaac ibn Ghayyat (Me'ah She'arim), 11th-century Spanish halakhist and commentator.
- Simhah ben Samuel of Vitry, 11th-century French Talmudist (?–1105)
- Bahya ibn Paquda, (Hovot ha-Levavot), 11th-century Spanish philosopher and moralist
- Rabbenu Gershom, 11th-century German Talmudist and legalist
- Isaac Alfasi, (Hilkhot haRif), 11th-century North African and Spanish Talmudist and Halakhist
- Jonah ibn Janah, 11th-century Hebrew grammarian
- Rashi, (Solomon ben Yitzchak), 11th-century French Talmudist and exegete
- Tosafists, (Tosafot), 11th-, 12th- and 13th-century Talmudic scholars in France and Germany
- Simeon Kara, 11th-century rabbi and Joseph's father
- Baruch ben Samuel (haHokhmah), 12th-century Talmudist and poet (d. 1221)

=== 12th century ===
- Isaac ben Melchizedek (Ribmatz), 12th-century Talmudist (c. 1090–1160)
- Isaac of Chernigov, 12th-century exegete
- Eleazar of Worms (Rokeah), 12th-century German halakhist
- Judah ben Samuel of Regensburg (Hasidim), 12th-century German mystic and halakhist
- Isaac ben Abba Mari (Ittur Soferim), 12th-century Provençal rabbi (c. 1122 – c. 1193)
- Jacob ben Meir, 12th-century Talmudist, halakhist, and Biblical philologist (1100–1171)
- Shemaiah of Soissons, 12th-century Talmudist and Biblical exegete
- Joseph Kara, 12th-century Biblical exegete. (c. 1065 – c. 1135)
- Isaiah di Trani, 12th-century Biblical exegete and halakhist. (c. 1180 – c. 1250)
- Isaac ben Dorbolo, 12th-century halakhist
- Abraham ibn Daud, (Kabbalah), 12th-century Spanish philosopher
- Abraham ibn Ezra, (Ibn Ezra), 12th-century Spanish-North African Biblical commentator
- Samuel ben Jacob Jam'a, 12th-century North African rabbi and scholar
- Joseph Kimhi (HaGilui), 12th-century exegete, grammarian, and lexicographer
- Moses Kimhi, 12th-century biblical commentator and grammarian.
- David Kimhi, (RaDaK), 12th-century French biblical commentator, philosopher, and grammarian
- Eliezer ben Nathan, 12th-century poet and pietist
- Hillel ben Eliakim, (Rabbeinu Hillel), 12th-century Talmudist and disciple of Rashi
- Solomon ben Meir, 12th-century grandson of Rashi, one of the Tosafot.
- Ibn Tibbon, a family of 12th- and 13th-century Spanish and French scholars, translators, and leaders
- Joseph ibn Migash, 12th-century Spanish Talmudist and rosh yeshiva; teacher of Maimon, father of Maimonides
- Maimonides, Moshe Ben Maimon, (Rambam), 12th-century Spanish-North African Talmudist, philosopher, and law codifier
- Samuel ben Judah ibn Tibbon, 12th- and 13th-century French Maimonidean philosopher and translator
- Yehuda Halevi, (Kuzari), 12th-century Spanish philosopher and poet devoted to Zion
- David ben Reuven Bonafed, (Rabbeinu David), 12th-century Talmudist with a commentary on Masechet Pesachim that has become influential on contemporary Iyyun
- Yitzhak Saggi Nehor, (Isaac the Blind), 12th- and 13th-century Provençal Kabbalist
- Zerachiah ha-Levi of Girona, (Maor), 12th-century Talmudist
- Moses ben Isaac ben ha-Nessiah (Shoham), 12th- and 13th-century grammarian

=== 13th century ===
- Isaac ben Meir Halevi of Düren (Sha'arei Dura), 13th-century halakhist (1220–1300)
- Isaac ben Joseph of Corbeil (Mitzvot Katan), 13th-century halakhist (d. 1280)
- Isaac of Ourville (Menahel), 13th-century halakhist
- Menahem Recanati (Pisqe Recanati), 13th-century halakhist
- Abraham ben Nathan (Manhig), 13th-century Provençal Talmudist.
- Moses de León (Zohar), 13th-century Spanish Kabbalist
- Moses ben Meir of Ferrara, 13th-century Tosafist
- Eliezer ben Samuel of Metz (Yereim), 13th-century Tosafist. (c. 1140–1237)
- Eliezer ben Samuel of Verona, 13th-century Tosafist.
- Judah ben Benjamin Anaw, 13th-century Italian halakhist and Talmudist (c. 1215-1280)
- Zedekiah ben Abraham Anaw (Shibbolei HaLeqet), 13th-century Italian halakhist (c. 1220–1280)
- Benjamin ben Abraham Anaw, 13th-century poet, exegete, and halakhist. (d. c. 1289)
- Abba Mari, (Minhat Kenaot), 13th-century Provençal rabbi (c. 1250 – c. 1306)
- Isaiah di Trani the Younger, 13th-century Biblical exegete and halakhist
- Asher ben Jehiel, (Rosh), 13th-century German-Spanish Talmudist
- Meir of Rothenburg, 13th-century German rabbi and poet
- Isaac ben Moses of Vienna, 13th-century Bohemian Posek
- Meir Abulafia, (Yad Ramah), 13th-century Spanish Talmudist
- Mordecai ben Hillel, (The Mordechai), 13th-century German Halakhist
- Nahmanides, Moshe ben Nahman, (Ramban), 13th-century Spanish and Holy Land mystic and Talmudist
- Menachem Meiri, (Meiri), 13th-century Talmudist
- Yom Tov Asevilli, (Ritva), 13th-century Talmudist
- Solomon ben Aderet, (Rashba), 13th-century Talmudist
- Aharon HaLevi, (Ra'ah), 13th-century Talmudist
- Meshullam ben Jacob, (Meshullam Hagadol), 13th-century Talmudist (1235–1310)
- Joseph Caspi, 13th– and 14th-century talmudist, grammarian, and philosopher (1280–1345)
- Bahya ben Asher ibn Halawa, 13th- and 14th-century commentator, Talmudist and Kabbalist
- Moses of Évreux, one of three rabbi brothers in 13th-century Normandy, modern-day France.

=== 14th century ===
- Samson ben Samuel (Kitzur Mordechai, Yeriot Izzim), 14th-century poet and halakhist
- Menahem ben Aaron ibn Zerah, 14th-century halakhist (d. 1385)
- Moses da Rieti (Miqdash Me'at), 14th-century poet and philosopher
- David Abudirham, 14th-century liturgical commentator
- Gersonides, Levi ben Gershom, (Ralbag), 14th-century French Talmudist and philosopher
- Jacob ben Asher, (Arba'ah Turim), 14th-century German-Spanish Halakhist
- Yaakov ben Moshe Levi Moelin, (Maharil), 14th-century codifier of German minhag
- Hasdai Crescas, (Or Hashem), 14th-century Talmudist and philosopher
- Isaac Lattes (Kiryat Sefer), 14th-century French chronicler.
- Immanuel of Rome, 14th-century Italian poet (1261-c. 1335)
- Benjamin ben Judah, 14th-century Italian exegete. (c. 1290-1335)
- Kalonymus ben Kalonymus, 14th-century French translator and philosopher.
- Benjamin ben Isaac of Carcassonne, 14th-century scholar.
- Nissim of Gerona, (RaN), 14th-century Halakhist and Talmudist
- Crescas Vidal, 14th-century Talmudist and philosopher
- Moses of Zurich (SM"K miZurich), 14th-century halakhist (fl. 1360)
- Samuel ben Aaron Schlettstadt (Mordechai haKatan), 14th-century German halakhist
- Simeon ben Zemah Duran (Tashbetz), 14th- and 15th-century Halakhist (1361–1444)

=== 15th century ===
- Don Isaac Abravanel (Abarbanel), 15th-century philosopher and Torah commentator (1437–1508)
- Joseph ben Moses (Leqet Yosher), 15th-century halakhist (c. 1420–1488)
- Abraham Saba, Castilian exegete (1440–1508)
- Meir ben Ezekiel ibn Gabbai (Tola'at Yaakov), Sephardic kabbalist (1480 – c. 1540)
- Joseph Albo (Ikkarim), 15th-century Spain
- Israel Bruna, 15th-century German Rabbi and Posek
- Obadiah ben Abraham of Bertinoro (Bartenura), 15th-century commentator on the Mishnah

== See also ==
- Rabbinic literature
- Eras of history important in Jewish law
- List of rabbis
- History of Responsa § Rishonim
- Rishon (disambiguation)
