= Samuel Sulami =

14th-century Talmudist, poet and philanthropist

Rabbi Samuel Sulami, also known as Samuel of Escaleta, was a French Talmudist, poet, and philanthropist of the fourteenth century. Sulami took an active role in the Maimonidean controversies of 1300-1306.

== Biography ==
He lived in Narbonne, and later in Perpignan. While in Narbonne, he engaged in a halachic discussion with Rabbi Shlomo ibn Aderet about coinage that was devalued by 25%.

=== Maimonidean controversies ===
This controversy was primarily about using philosophical allegorical interpretations and subsidizing of the Torah's authority with Aristotle. Abba Mari of Lunel approached Shlomo ibn Aderet of Barcelona to ban this philosophical approach. Ibn Aderet himself, however, had engaged in astral magic earlier in his life and denied that it was in any way offensive to halakha. Nonetheless, in 1305 ibn Aderet issued a local ban against extreme allegory and the study of Greek physics and metaphysics by anyone under the age of 25.

Menachem Meiri and Jedaiah ben Abraham Bedersi, rejected this ban, as well as accusations for lax observance.

Sulami demonstrated his support for the philosophical approach by hosting Levi ben Abraham ben Hayyim of Villefranche, a proponent of that view, in his house at Perpignan.

Despite pressure from Shlomo ibn Aderet, he did not abandon Levi.

Crescas Vidal defended Sulami and Levi, stating that Sulami was a pious man, and that based on information he received from Marseille, Levi was also pious and just, following the Torah and only engaged in philosophical studies in order to argue against heretics. He further stated that all the negative things that had been said about these two men were pure slander; because, if it were true that Levi had deviated from the straight path, Samuel Sulami would not have welcomed him into his house.

== Personal life ==
However, after Sulami's daughter died, he believed that it was Divine punishment for supporting natural philosophy and he withdrew his support and hospitality from Levi.

The misfortunes that befell Sulami seem to have led to a change in his religious attitude. Whereas formerly, supported the study of philosophy, now, he joined ibn Aderet in forbidding the young to study the sciences and the allegoric interpretation of the Biblical narratives.

== Reception ==
Attesting to his greatness, Menachem Meiri praised Sulami as one of the renowned halachists of Languedoc.

From Perpignan to Marseilles there is not another who can be compared with Samuel Sulami in knowledge of the Law, benevolence, piety and humility. He gives charity in secret, his house is open to every traveler; and he is indefatigable in getting books for his collection.

We know nothing more about Sulami, except that Jacob of Provence considered him one of the first poets of Provence. However, none of Sulami's poetry remains extant.

== Etymology of his name ==
Geiger explains the etymology of the name Sulami. Sulam means ladder. He therefore claims that Samuel came from La Escula or Les Échelles. This is why Graetz refers to him as Samuel of Escaleta. Renan and Neubauer claim it is more likely he came from La Escala in the province of Girona.

== Bibliography ==
- Renan-Neubauer, Les Rabbins Français, pp. 658, 701;
- Grätz, Gesch. vii. 220, 224;
- Gross, Gallia Judaica, pp. 328, 432.
