= Maimonidean Controversy =

Philosophical dispute in Judaism

The Maimonidean Controversy is the series of ongoing disputes between so-called “philosophers” and “traditionalists”. The principal part of the controversy took place in the thirteenth and fourteenth centuries, but the questions raised have remained unresolved until today. The debates initially centered around Maimonides’ writings after they had been made accessible to French rabbinic scholars by translation to Medieval Hebrew from medieval Judeo-Arabic and stood in direct relation to Maimonides’ project of mediating Jewish tradition and Greco-Islamic philosophy, scientia sacra, and science. However, characters within the controversy can often not be ascribed to one camp (“philosophy” or “tradition”); these are simplified and polemic categories, used in the literature contemporary to the controversy itself.

== The four phases of the controversy ==
No other Jewish philosophical writings have produced such controversy as Maimonides’ The Guide for the Perplexed. The Maimonidean Controversy is in historiographic literature, often divided into four phases, where heated debate was not infrequently joined with reciprocal bans.

=== First Stage: 1180-1204 ===
Already in the last years of Maimonides’ life, a controversy erupted based on theological grounds when he critiqued the institutions of Jewish diaspora within which geonim (rabbinic scholars) found a comfortable living through stipends or donations. Maimonides’ view was that they – like himself – should work in a second occupation to sustain themselves. This fell into a time when Samuel ben Ali tried to minimize the Exilarch’s power for the benefit of the geonim.

In addition to his institutional critique, in the introduction to his Mishneh Torah, Maimonides suggested that this work would make the employment of rabbinic scholars redundant. At this stage, even though some philosophical issues were discussed, mainly Maimonides’ revolutionary views were seen to be on Talmud scholarship and Jewish leadership.

=== First Stage in Europe ===
The main subject of the controversy in Europe had been Maimonides' Mishneh Torah, which he wrote in Hebrew. His previous works were inaccessible to European scholars, who did not know Arabic. The controversy heated up when most of Maimonides’ works were translated into Hebrew, most notably The Guide for the Perplexed in 1204 by Samuel ibn Tibbon. Maimonides’ works had been unsurprising for Jewish scholars immersed in the Arabic philosophical tradition, whose critique was mostly limited to his social criticism and his unconventional methodology. European scholarship, whether Jewish or Christian, had been largely unexposed to science or philosophy.

Maimonides did not provide any citations in his Mishneh Torah, for which he was mainly criticized by Abraham ben David of Posquières, who was part of the Hachmei Provence. His hasagah or critical gloss to his introduction has been included in the editions of the Mishneh Torah since the 16th century. He also articulates a theoretical critique of Maimonides’ declaration of corporealist beliefs as heresy. Although it is never really clear whether Maimonides denies the universal resurrection, he is accused as such by ben David.

Meir Abulafia was initially an admirer of Maimonides. When he found, however, about the charges that Maimonides had denied the resurrection of the dead, he responded furiously and disappointedly. But when he saw Maimonides’ ambiguously apologetic Treatise on Resurrection (1190–91), published in response to the charges, he was convinced that Maimonides did believe. After Maimonides died in 1204, the controversy simmered down.

=== Second Stage: 1230-1235 ===
The context for the second stage of the Maimononidean Controversy was in Provence, where Maimonides’ work became a platform on which the general conflict between philosophy and tradition could be contested. Maimonides’ work fell into a time of ideological formation of a Christian Europe with the Crusades and the Reconquista. Mystical tendencies and kabbalistic circles were on the rise in al-Andalus and philosophy had enjoyed a great flourishing also of Jewish authors under Muslim rule.

Maimonides’ projects to combine Jewish tradition with Aristotelianism, a problem already in the Talmud addressed as “Greek wisdom”. Wolfson generalizes this to be an issue common to Latin, Arabic and Jewish traditions, which all attempted “Philonic” structures to combine reason with revelation. Maimonides' attempt to synthesize philosophy with revelation followed similar attempts by Philo, Abraham ibn Daud and Saadia Gaon, but it arrived in Europe as Greek texts became more accessible to Christian scholars following the Sack of Constantinople and as the spread of universities challenged monasteries as the monopolies of scholarship. As the Catholic Church and the French crown conducted the Albigensian Crusade in Occitania and adjacent regions, both anti-Maimonidean rabbis and the Dominican-led Inquisition were quick to draw connections between Occitanian "heresy" and Maimonides' ideas.

In 1232, the rabbis of northern France, led by Yonah Gerondi and Solomon ben Abraham of Montpellier, issued a ban against the study of philosophy, including The Guide to the Perplexed and the Sefer HaMada, the introduction to the Mishneh Torah that contained philosophical readings. The traditionalists accused philosophers of denying miracles, regarding prophecy as a natural phenomenon, undermining the Torah's authority, rejecting traditional eschatology, engaging in allegorization, denying the historicity of persons and events, and laxity of observance of the commandments. When, however, in 1232 Maimonides’ books were confiscated and burnt by Dominicans (although there are stories about this being initiated by anti-Maimonideans who brought the books to the attention of the authorities, the historical situation is more than unclear), the Jewish communities of Hachmei Provence, northern France, and northern Spain were shocked and many anti-Maimonideans relented their views.

Letters exchanged during the 1230s, between David Qimhi and Yuda Alfakhar, are preserved in Iggeroth Qena’oth, it was suggested by S. Harvey that this served as the model for Shem-Tov ibn Falaquera’s Epistle of Debate.

Abraham Maimonides, Maimonides’ son, was outraged when he heard of the accusations brought against his father in Europe. The desecration of Maimonides’ tomb and the burning of Talmudic literature in the 1240s in Paris set the debates aside for a few decades.

=== Third Stage: 1288-1290 ===
The third stage is far less significant and involved a far lesser scope. It is, however, indicative of the diverging contexts of Christian Europe and Muslim-ruled North Africa and the Levant. Solomon Petit had immigrated to Palestine in 1288 and taught Kabbalah in Acre where he continued agitating against Maimonides’ thought. He found himself, however, in an environment long accustomed to science and philosophy and earned not only ridicule playing on his name (peti-fool) but was also banned 4 times. He also seemed to have forgotten that he fell under the Egyptian nagid’s jurisdiction, who happened to be Maimonides’ grandson. In addition, Shem-Tove ibn Falaquera sent letters of opposition.

=== Fourth Stage: 1300-1306 ===
In this last controversy, the entry of philosophy into tradition was not debated anymore – Maimonidean ideas had found support even amongst the traditionalists who now sought to limit the study of philosophical works at the expense of traditional scholarship. Kabbalistic practices and esoteric exegesis had become commonplace amongst the “philosophers”, on the basis of which (especially astral magic – which, ironically, had been denied reality by Maimonides) they were accused of idolatry.

Abba Mari of Lunel approached Shlomo ibn Aderet of Barcelona because he saw the philosopher's allegorical interpretations and subsidizing of the Torah's authority with Aristotle. Ibn Aderet himself, however, had engaged in astral magic earlier in his life and denied that it was in any way offensive to halakha. Nonetheless, in 1305 he issued a local ban against extreme allegory and the study of Greek physics and metaphysics by anyone under the age of 25. Shlomo ibn Aderet and allies in southern France hoped this would lead to similar bans by French rabbis.

Menachem Meiri and Jedaiah ben Abraham Bedersi, Astruc's main opponents, rejected this ban, as well as accusations for lax observance. Jacob Anatoli (1194–1296), however, in his Malmad HaTalmidim, did draw heavily on allegorical interpretation, including cosmological readings of Torah passages, ‘in the manner of the Christians’, as his opponents were quick to accuse him of.

Meiri issued a counter-ban against Astruc, emphasizing that philosophy and “Greek wisdom” was as important as the study of the Torah, as long as they went hand in hand. Bedersi followed suit with a Letter of Apology (Hebrew: כתב התנצלות, romanized: Kəṯaḇ hāHiṯnaṣluṯ), a sharp attack against the “traditionalists”. After this, the last stage of the controversy faded out and found a shocking end in the expulsion of the Jews from France in 1306.

=== Aftermath ===
Even now, the Maimonidean project is not concluded, and the question about the possibility or impossibility of combining Jewish tradition and science/philosophy was never resolved. For example, in the 16th century, Moses Isserles defended philosophy against Solomon Luria. While this continues to be debated (as it does in Christian, Muslim or secular cultures), Maimonides is today counted among the greatest of Jewish tradition. Most opponents to philosophy made apologetically sure that they could not be misunderstood in violating the authority of Maimonides.
