= 1232 in France =

- Decades: 1210s; 1220s; 1230s; 1240s; 1250s
- See also: History of France; Timeline of French history; List of years in France

Events from the year 1232 in France.

== Incumbents ==
- Monarch - Louis IX

== Events ==
=== Full dates unknown ===
- The city of Troyes issued its first recorded life annuity.
- As part of the Maimonidean Controversy, rabbis of northern France, led by Yonah Gerondi and Solomon of Montpellier, issued a ban against the study of philosophy.
- Boniface of Savoy was appointed as the Prior of Nantua.
- Gaucher II de Châteaurenard, Count of Joigny, was given permission to rebuild the fortress Château de Châteaurenard.
- Jean II de Nesle ceded his property on where the Hôtel de Soissons would later be built to king Louis IX.
- Establishment of Martigues on the southern coast of present-day France.
- Construction of Beauvais Cathedral was postponed due to a funding crisis.

== Births ==
=== Full dates unknown ===
- Bernard Saisset, French nobleman and bishop (died 1314)
- Nicholas of Gorran, French preacher and scriptural commentator (died 1295)

== Deaths ==
- 28 January - Peire de Montagut, Grand Master of Knights Templar (birth date unknown)

=== Full dates unknown ===
- John I Tristan, son of King Louis VIII (born 1219)
