= Shlomo ben Avraham =

Shlomo ben Avraham may refer to:

- Shlomo ben Avraham ibn Aderet
- Solomon ben Abraham of Montpellier
