= Isaac ben Mordecai =

Italian Jewish physician

Isaac ben Mordecai, known as Maestro Gajo, was an Italian Jewish physician. He acted as physician to Pope Nicholas IV or Pope Boniface VIII, at the end of the thirteenth century.

For him Nathan of Cento translated into Hebrew an Arabic work by 'Ammar ibn Ali al-Mauṣili, on the cure of diseases of the eye. Gajo was held in great esteem by the physicians Zerahiah ben Shealtiel Ḥen and Hillel ben Samuel of Verona. From Forlì, the latter wrote to Gajo two long letters (see "Ḥemdah Genuzah," pp. 18-22) on the dispute concerning Maimonides's doctrines, which Gajo followed with interest.
