= Moses of Lunel =

Rabbi Moses ha-Kohen of Lunel, known by the acronym RaMaCH, was one of the sages of Lunel in Provence, a contemporary of Maimonidies, and the author of Haggahot (or: Hasagot) haRaMaCH , glosses on the Rambam's Mishneh Torah.

== His works ==
The Hasagot ha-RaMaCH is one of the standard commentaries on the Rambam. According to the Sefer Yuchasin of Abraham Zacuto, the Rambam himself responded to his critiques, but those responses have been lost. Rabbi Ḥayyim Yosef David Azulai argued that only a minority of the critiques were actually sent to the Rambam, and that most were written after his death. He also claimed to have seen a manuscript containing the annotations.

Similar to the Hassagot ha-Ra'avad, in cases where Rabbi Moses does not dispute the Rambam, some halachic decisors inferred from this silence that he agreed with him. However, in cases where the Ra'avad had already disagreed, it is possible that Rabbi Moses relied on his words and therefore did not express his own opinion explicitly.

Manuscripts of the RaMaCH's annotations were in the hands of various authors who cite and quote from them, but they were never brought to print. In particular, Rabbi Joseph Karo quoted them extensively in his Kesef Mishneh. They are also cited by the Rashba, the Ritva, and other Rishonim.

A manuscript of the work exists in the Oxford Library. The annotations were first printed in their entirety in 1970 as a standalone volume, and were subsequently printed in the margins of the Rambam text in the Frankel edition. The extant manuscript contains annotations on only six of the fourteen books of the Rambam's Yad ha-Chazakah. It is not known with certainty whether the RaMaCH wrote annotations on the remaining books as well. In his annotations, the RaMaCH mentions several times his own Talmudic novellae ("my chidushim," "my kuntres"), but these have not survived.

The RaMaCH held Jewish customs (minhagim) in high regard — both general practice and local custom in particular — and on several occasions criticized the Rambam on the basis of custom alone. One of his most famous annotations concerns the Rambam's ruling that a man who claims to be a kohen is not believed on his own word, and may not be called up to the Torah as a kohen on the basis of his own claim alone until he brings a witness to corroborate it. This ruling is based on the Talmud, yet the RaMaCH objects: "I am astonished, for our practice is to believe him and call him up to the Torah first" — and he explains the reasoning behind the departure from Talmudic law. The Maggid Mishneh there wrote that this is an erroneous custom not to be relied upon; however, the Rema ruled in accordance with the RaMaCH's view, and this remains the accepted practice today.
