= Aaron ben Joseph =

Aaron ben Joseph may refer to:

- Aaron ben Joseph of Constantinople (c. 1260 – c. 1320), teacher, philosopher, physician, and liturgical poet
- Aaron ben Joseph of Beaugency, French Bible commentator and rabbinical scholar
- Aaron ben Joseph of Buda, 17th-century Judæo-German poet

== See also ==
- Aaron ben Joseph ha-Levi, Talmudist and critic
- Aaron ben Joseph Sason, 16th-century Ottoman Talmudic author
