= Ethical will =

Document relaying ethical values to the next generation

An ethical will (Hebrew: צוואה, romanized: tzava'ah, lit. 'will') is a document that passes ethical values from one generation to the next. Rabbis and Jewish laypeople have continued to write ethical wills during the nineteenth and twentieth centuries. (Riemer) In recent years, the practice has been more widely used by the general public. In BusinessWeek magazine and in an American Bar Association electronic newsletter it is described as an aid to estate planning; (Murphy; Friedman) in health care and hospice (Baines; Freed) and as a spiritual healing tool. (Weil; Freed).

== Origins ==
The ethical will is an ancient document from the Jewish tradition. The original template for its use came from Genesis 49:1–33. A dying Jacob gathered his sons to offer them his blessing and to request that they bury him not in Egypt, but instead in Canaan in the cave at Machpelah with his ancestors.

Other biblical examples of ethical wills include Deuteronomy 32:46–47 where Moses instructs the Israelites to be a holy people and teach their children, and Matthew 5, where Jesus blesses his disciples. The early rabbis urged men to "transmit the tradition’s ethical teachings" and they communicated orally to their sons. Later they were written as letters. Eleazar ben Samuel HaLevi of Mainz, Germany, who died 1357, wrote to and instructed his sons to "Put me in the ground at the right hand of my father ...".

== Medieval to early modern periods ==
Ethical wills became increasingly common in Spain, Germany, and France between the 11th and 13th centuries. Medieval ethical wills contain the directions of fathers to their children or of aged teachers to their disciples. They were often written calmly in old age. Some of them were carefully composed, and read as formal ethical treatises. But most were written in a personal writing style, and were intended for the private use of children and relatives, or of some beloved pupil who held a special place in his teacher's regard. Because they were not designed for publication, they often revealed the writer's innermost feelings and ideals. Israel Abrahams, while editor of the Jewish Quarterly Review, judged that many of these ethical wills are intellectually poor, but of a high moral level.

The earliest extant ethical will was written by Eleazar, the son of Isaac of Worms (about 1050). "Think not of evil," says Eleazar, "for evil thinking leads to evil doing ... Purify thy body, the dwelling-place of thy soul ... Give of all thy food a portion to God. Let God's portion be the best, and give it to the poor." The will of Judah ben Saul ibn Tibbon, a translator, (about 1190) contains at least one passage worthy of Ruskin: "Avoid bad society, make thy books thy companions, let thy book-cases and shelves be thy gardens and pleasure-grounds. Pluck the fruit that grows therein, gather the roses, the spices, and the myrrh. If thy soul be satiate and weary, change from garden to garden, from furrow to furrow, from sight to sight. Then will thy desire renew itself, and thy soul be satisfied with delight." The will of Nahmanides is an unaffected eulogy of humility. Asher, the son of Yechiel (fourteenth century), called his will "Ways of Life", and it includes 132 maxims, which are often printed in the prayer-book. An example is, "Do not obey the Law for reward, nor avoid sin from fear of punishment, but serve God from love."

The elaborate "Letter of Advice" by Solomon Alami (beginning of the 15th century) is composed in rhymed prose, and is a historical record. Alami shared the sufferings of the Jews of the Iberian Peninsula in 1391, and this gives context to his counsel: "Flee without hesitation when exile is the only means of securing religious freedom; have no regard to your worldly career or your property, but go at once."

The ethical wills of the 16th through 18th centuries are similar to earlier, but they tend to be more learned and less simple.

== Modern perspectives ==
Celebrity physician Andrew Weil promoted the ethical will as a "gift of spiritual health" to leave to family, asserting that the ethical will's "main importance is what it gives the writer in the midst of life." The goal of writing an ethical will is to link a person to both their family and cultural history, clarify their ethical and spiritual values, and communicate a legacy to future generations; it addresses people's "universal needs". Writing an ethical will clarifies identity and focuses life purpose. Writing an ethical will addresses a person's needs to belong, be known, be remembered, have one's life make a difference, bless and be blessed.

Ethical wills are written by both men and women of every age, ethnicity, faith tradition, economic circumstance, and educational level. Published examples include The Measure of Our Success: A Letter to My Children and Yours by Marion Wright Edelman, Everything I Know: Basic Life Rules from a Jewish Mother, and President Barack Obama's legacy letter to his daughters of January 18, 2009. The ethical will is a tool for spiritual healing in religious communities and in the care of seniors, the ailing and the dying. Estate and financial professionals use the ethical will to help clients articulate values to inform charitable and personal financial decisions and preparation of the last will and testament. The ethical will is nevertheless not a legal document.

The concept of the ancient traditional ethical will was to "transmit ethical instructions to future generations". Modern heirs may resist being "controlled from the grave" and more readily accept explicitly spiritual blessings from elders.

== Content ==
The content of an ethical will may be similar to that of a memoir or autobiography, but is differentiated by its "intention to transmit love and learning to future generations". Writing can include family history and cultural and spiritual values; blessings and expressions of love for, pride in, hopes and dreams for children and grandchildren; life-lessons and wisdom of life experience; requests for forgiveness for regretted actions; the rationale for philanthropic and personal financial decisions; stories about meaningful objects for heirs to receive; clarification about and personalization of advance health directives; and requests for ways to be remembered after death.
