= Joseph ibn Yahya ben Solomon =

Portuguese biblical commentator

Joseph ibn Yahya ben Solomon was a pupil of Solomon ben Adret, at whose death he wrote an elegy that was reprinted. He defrayed the cost of repairing a synagogue built in Calatayud by one of his ancestors.
