= Judah ben Solomon Canpanton =

Judah ben Solomon Canpanton (14th century) was a Jewish ethical writer and philosopher. He was a student of Yom Tov b. Abraham Ishbili. He authored the work Arba'ah Kinyanim, which has been published, while other books remain in manuscript.
