= Yom Tov of Seville =

13th-14th century Talmudist

Yom Tov ben Avraham Assevilli ריטב״א
- Born: c. 1260; Seville, Spain
- Died: c. 1314
- Known for: Commentaries on Talmud

Yom Tov ben Abraham of Seville (c. 1260 – 1320; also Asevilli, Assevilli, Ashbili), commonly known by the Hebrew acronym Ritva (Hebrew: ריטב״א Rabbi Yom Tov ben Avraham), was a medieval rabbi and rosh yeshiva of the Yeshiva of Seville, known for his commentaries on the Talmud.

אהרון הלוי

רשב״א
ריטב״א
יהודה קנפנטון

Teachers
Students

== Biography ==
Asevilli was born in the city of Seville, Spain around 1260. His name, Asevilli is itself a topographic surname that identifies him as being from Seville.

He was the student of Solomon ibn Adret and Aaron ha-Levy. His works suggest that he spent some time studying in France. He spent most of his life in Zaragoza. He died between 1314 and 1328.

He was the rabbi and head of the Yeshiva of Seville in Spain.

== Writings ==
His commentary on the Talmud was collected and published as a novellae entitled Chiddushei Ha-Ritva. It is one of the most frequently referred-to Talmudic commentators today. Assevilli wrote two versions of his commentary, first an extended one and then a concise one. In general only the concise version survives.

Controversially attributed works include:

- Berakhot: Some thought it to be the work of Assevilli's father or Bezalel Ashkenazi, however it is now assumed to be the genuine work of Assevilli himself.
- Shabbat: Nissim of Gerona's commentary was misattributed to Assevilli by the Saloniki printers, but the genuine commentary is widely available.
- Nedarim: Very controversial. See the introduction to the MhRK edition.
- Gittin: The traditionally printed commentary is now known to be the work of Crescas Vidal, with few detractors. A second commentary in manuscript has been printed by MhRK; they conclude it is genuine but some scholars disagree.
- Kiddushin: Two separate commentaries have been attributed to Assevilli, but they are both suspicious and (at minimum) include large amounts of foreign material.
- Bava Metzia: Two separate commentaries have been attributed to Assevilli. Both are extremely controversial, but both may be genuine.
- Shevu'ot: Two separate commentaries have been attributed to Assevilli, one of which is traditionally printed. Apparently only the printed one is authentic, but the original Livorno printers heavily corrupted the text to correspond to Talmudic printings.
- Niddah: Authentic through the seventh pereq, after which the printed text is the commentary of Asher ben Jehiel.

He also wrote commentaries on the writings of Isaac Alfasi and certain works of Nahmanides.
