= Zerahiah ben Shealtiel Ḥen =

Zerahiah ben Shealtiel Ḥen, also called Zerahiah ben Shealtiel Gracian or Serachja ben Isaac Ben Shealtiel Halevi (fl. 1270-1290s) was a Spanish Jewish physician, philosopher, translator, and Hebraist. He flourished about the end of the thirteenth century. He was born either at Barcelona, or at Toledo. He is sometimes confused with Zerahiah ben Isaac ha-Levi Saladin, also a translator.

== Life ==
Zerahiah went to Rome about 1277, and wrote all his works there before 1290. In writing to the physician Hillel of Verona, he makes the point that while commenting upon the difficult passages of the Moreh, he followed the criticisms of Naḥmanides. It may be inferred from his commentary to the Book of Job that Arabic was his native language.

== Works ==
He wrote a philosophical commentary to the Book of Proverbs, finished November 28, 1288; another to Job, in which he derives many words from the Arabic. Both commentaries were published by Schwarz: the former in "Ha-Shaḥar" (ii. 65-80, 105-112, 169-176, 209-240, 281-288, 300-314) under the title of "Imre Da'at"; the latter in his "Tiḳwat Enosh" (Berlin, 1868). He wrote also a commentary on difficult, passages of the Moreh of Maimonides, comparing the work with that of Aristotle.

In his writings such as on the Book of Job Zerahiah ben Shealtiel Ḥen was one of the Talmudic scholars to identify metaphors following Maimonides.

Zerahiah was a prolific translator from Arabic into Hebrew of philosophical and medical works. Among his translations are the following:

- Aristotle's "Physics" under the Hebrew title "Sefer ha-Ṭeba'";
- "Metaphysics" under the title of "Mah she-Aḥar ha-Teba'";
- "De Cœlo et Mundo" under the title of "Ha-Shamayim weha-'Olam";
- "De Anima" under the title of "Sefer ha-Nefesh";
- "Liber de Causis" under the title of "Ha-Bi'ur ha-Ṭob ha-Gamur";
- Averroes's Middle Commentaries to Aristotle's "Physics," "Metaphysics," and "De Cœlo et Mundo," and the commentary of Themistius to the last-named work;
- The first two books of Avicenna's "Canon";
- Al-Farabi's "Risalah fl Mahiyyat al-Nafs" (Treatise on the Substance of the Soul), the Hebrew title of which is "Ma'mar be-Mahut ha-Nefesh" (published by Edelmann in his "Ḥemdah Genuzah," Königsberg, 1856);
- A medical work of Galen under the title of "Sefer he-Ḥola'im weha-Miḳrim" (The Book of Diseases and Accidents), from the Arabic of Ḥunain ibn Isḥaḳ;
- Three chapters of Galen's Καταγενή, with the same title in Hebrew characters;
- Maimonides's treatise on sexual intercourse ("Fial-Jima'");
- The "Aphorisms" of Maimonides ("Fuṣul Musa"), terminated at Rome in 1277.

Zerahiah's translations were mostly made for Shabbethai ben Solomon in 1284.

== Bibliography listed in Jewish Encyclopedia ==
- Moritz Steinschneider, Hebr. Uebers. pp. 111–114, 125, 146, 160, 262, 295, 652, 764, 765;
  - idem, Hebr. Bibl. iv. 125, viii. 89, x. 50, xi. 42, 91, 136, xii. 43, 47, xvi. 86;
- Leopold Zunz, G. S. iii. 269;
  - idem, Notes on Benjamin of Tudela, ed. Asher, ii. 32;
- Samuel David Luzzatto, Oẓar Neḥmad, ii. 229-245, iii. 109-111;
- Abraham Geiger, in Jüd. Zeit. vii. 149;
- Carmoly, Revue Orientale, i. 443-445;
- Michael, Heimann Joseph, (1891) Or ha-Ḥayyim, Frankfort-on-the-Main (in Hebrew), p. 370;
- Fuenn, Keneset Yisrael, pp. 337, 338
