= Buda =

Ancient capital of the Kingdom of Hungary

Coordinates: 47°28′N 19°03′E

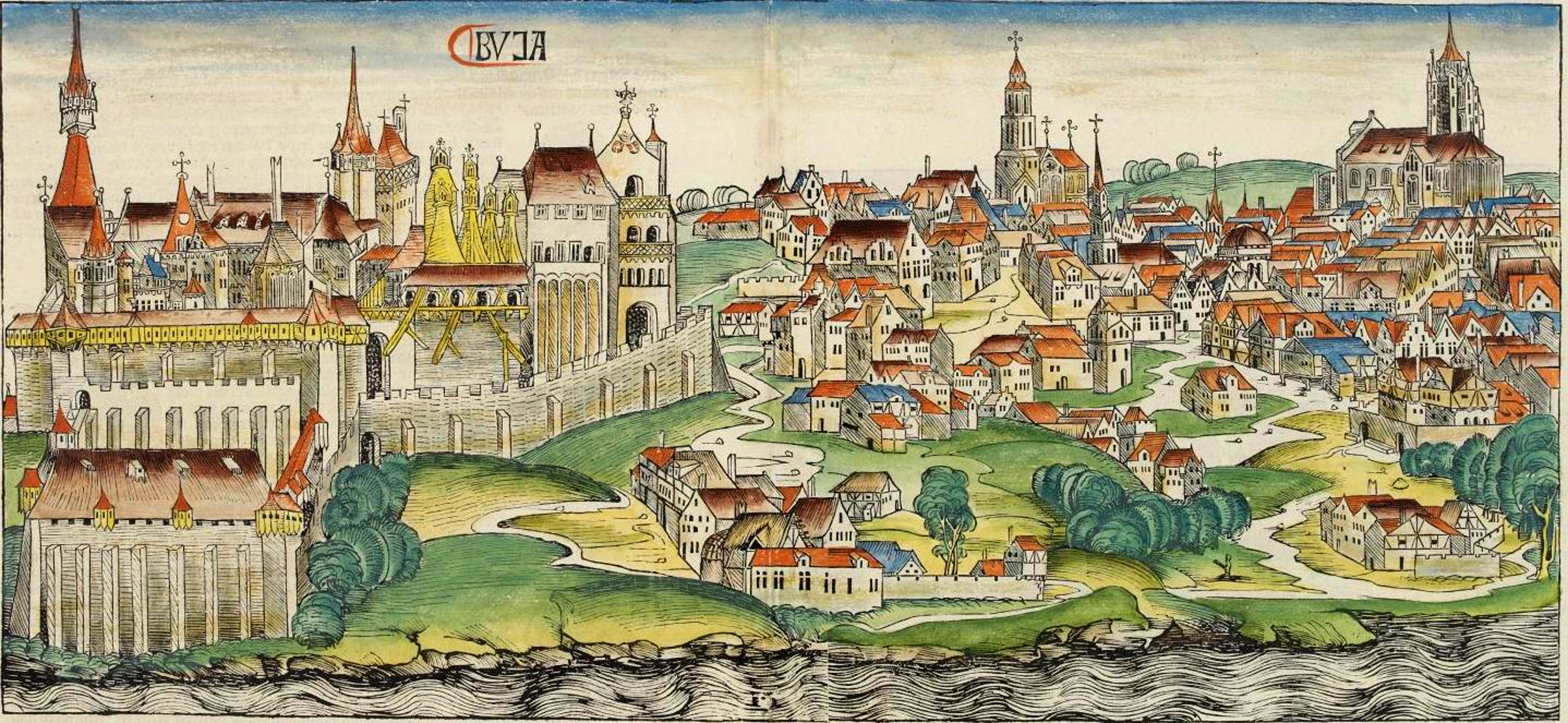
Buda in the Middle Ages (Nuremberg Chronicle, 1493)

Buda (Hungarian pronunciation: [ˈbudɒ], German: Ofen) is the part of Budapest, the capital city of Hungary, that lies on the western bank of the Danube. Historically, "Buda" referred only to the royal walled city on Castle Hill (Hungarian: Várhegy), which was constructed by Béla IV between 1247 and 1249 and subsequently served as the capital of the Kingdom of Hungary from 1361 to 1873. In 1873, Buda was administratively unified with Pest and Óbuda to form modern Budapest.

Royal Buda is called the Várnegyed (lit. 'Castle Quarter') today, while "Buda" pars pro toto denotes Budapest's I., II., III., XI., XII. and XXII. districts. This colloquial definition thus includes medieval Óbuda and amounts to a third of the city's total area, much of it forested. Buda's landmarks include the Royal Palace, Matthias Church, the Citadella, Gellért Baths, the Buda Hills, the Carmelite Monastery of Buda, and the residence of the President of Hungary, Sándor Palace.

== Etymology ==
According to a legend recorded in chronicles from the Middle Ages, the name "Buda" comes from the name of Bleda (Hungarian: Buda), brother of Hunnic ruler Attila.

He [Attila] entered Sicambria in Pannonia, in which city he slew with his own hands his brother Buda and cast his body into the Danube because while Attila sojourned in the regions of the west Buda had greedily disregarded the limits set between him and his brother Attila by causing Sicambria to be called by the name of Budavára, after himself. And although King Attila issued a decree to the Huns and other nations that the name of that town should be not Budavára [Buda Castle] but the city of Attila, and the Germans, fearing this edict, call it Etzelburg [Attila Castle] that is, the city of Attila. The Hungarians, caring nothing for the decree, name and call it Óbuda [Old Buda] until this day

— Mark of Kalt: Illuminated Chronicle

The Scythians are certainly an ancient people and the strength of Scythia lies in the east, as we said above. And the first king of Scythia was Magog, son of Japhet, and his people were called after him Moger [Magyar], from whose royal line the most renowned and mighty King Attila descended, who, in the 451st year of Our Lord’s birth, coming down from Scythia, entered Pannonia with a mighty force and, putting the Romans to flight, took the realm and made a royal residence for himself beside the Danube above the hot springs, and he ordered all the old buildings that he found there to be restored and he built them in a circular and very strong wall that in the Hungarian language is now called Budavár [Buda Castle] and by the Germans Etzelburg [Attila Castle].

— Anonymus: Gesta Hungarorum

An alternative etymology derives it from Aquincum, 'place of water', which was translated by the Proto-Slavic *vodà ('water'), which later became 'Buda'.

== Demographics ==
Flag of Buda before 1873.

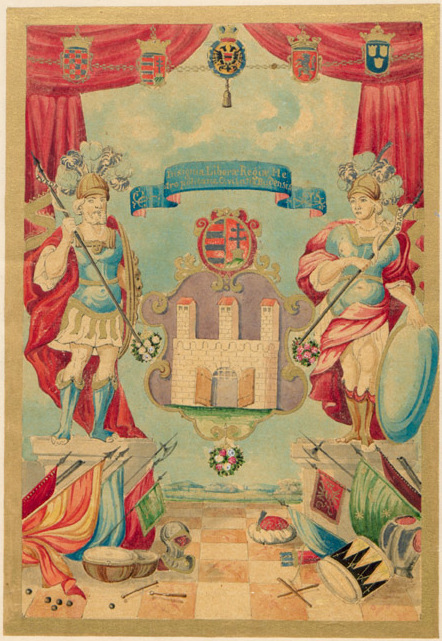
Historical coat of arms of Buda, used between 1703 and 1873.

The Buda fortress and palace were built by King Béla IV of Hungary in 1247, and were the nucleus around which the town of Buda was built, which soon gained great importance, and became in 1361 the capital of Hungary.

While Pest was mostly Hungarian in the 15th century, Buda had a German majority; however according to the Hungarian Royal Treasury, it had a Hungarian majority with a sizeable German minority in 1495. In 1432, Bertrandon de la Broquière wrote that Buda "is governed by Germans, as well in respect to police as commerce, and what regards the different professions". He noted a significant Jewish population in the city, proficient in French, many of whom were descendants of Jews previously expelled from France.

Buda became part of Ottoman-ruled central Hungary from 1541 to 1686. It was the capital of the province of Budin during the Ottoman era. By the middle of the seventeenth century Buda had become majority Muslim, largely resulting from an influx of Balkan Muslims.

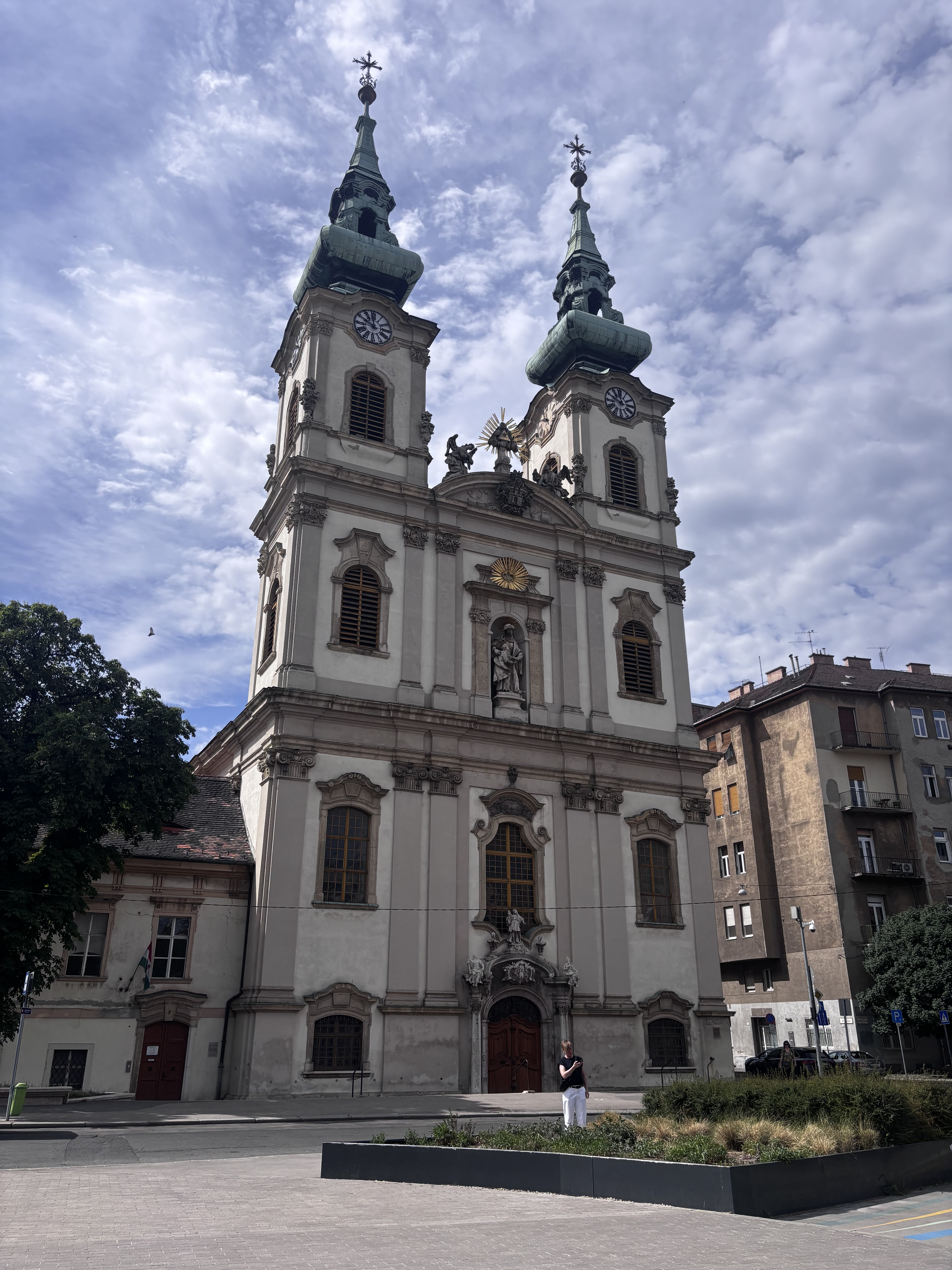
The Church of Saint Anne in 2026

In 1686, two years after the unsuccessful siege of Buda, a renewed European campaign was started to enter Buda, which was formerly the capital of medieval Hungary. This time, the Holy League's army was twice as large, containing over 74,000 men, including German, Dutch, Hungarian, English, Spanish, Czech, French, Croat, Burgundian, Danish and Swedish soldiers, along with other Europeans as volunteers, artillerymen, and officers, the Christian forces reconquered Buda (see Siege of Buda).

After the reconquest of Buda, bourgeoisie from different parts of southern Germany moved into the almost deserted city. Germans — also clinging to their language — partly crowded out, partly assimilated the Hungarians and Serbians they had found here. As the rural population moved into Buda, in the 19th century Hungarians slowly became the majority there.

== Notable residents ==
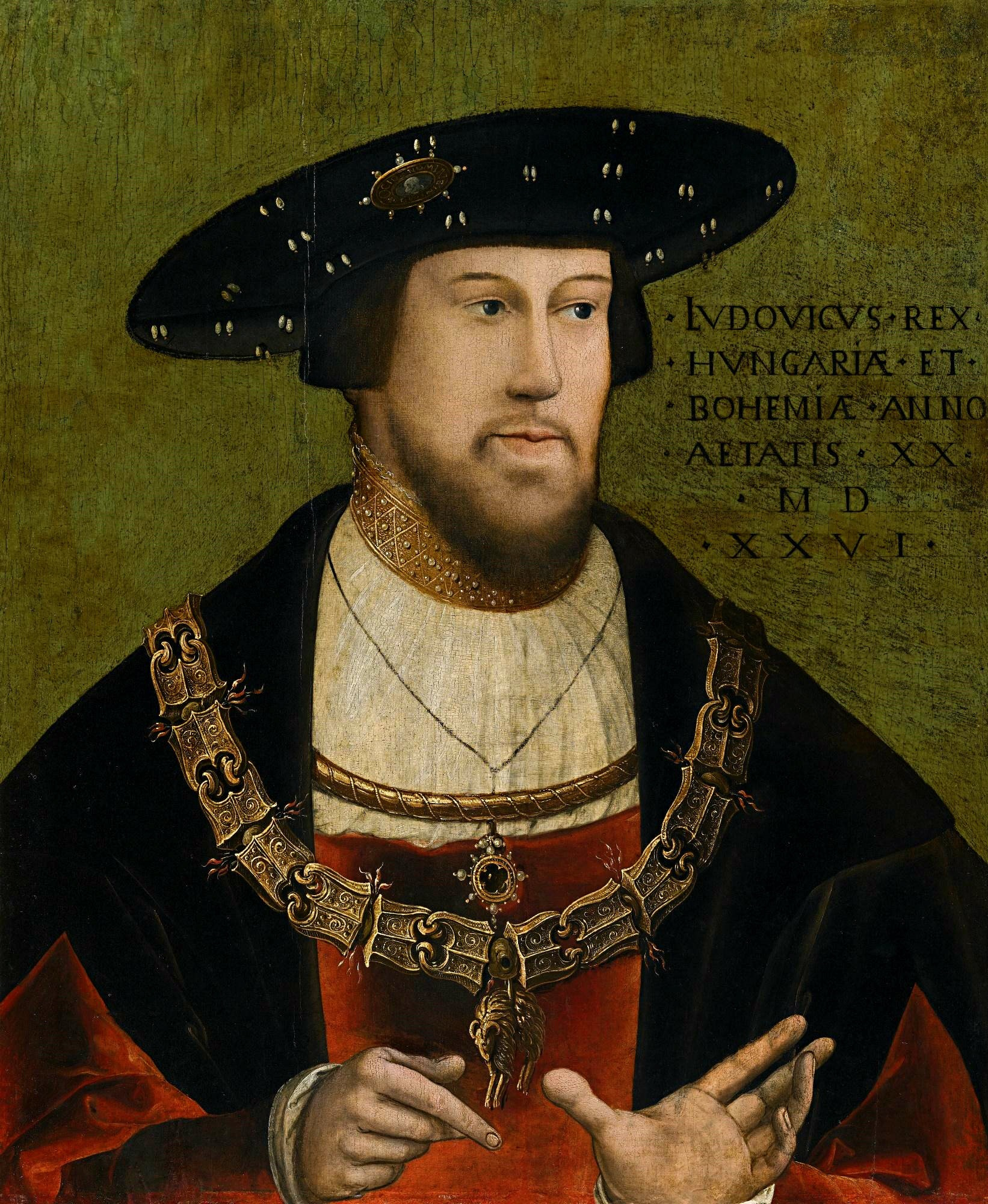
Portrait of King Louis II of Hungary ca.1526

- Andrew III of Hungary, (ca.1265–1301) King of Hungary and Croatia, 1290 to 1301, buried in the Greyfriars' Church, a Franciscan church in Buda
- Jadwiga of Poland, (ca.1373–1399), born in Buda, first female monarch of the Kingdom of Poland
- John Corvinus (1473–1504) illegitimate son of Matthias Corvinus, King of Hungary, and his mistress, Barbara Edelpöck.
- Louis II of Hungary (1506–1526) King of Hungary, Croatia and Bohemia from 1516 to 1526.
- Aaron ben Joseph of Buda (ca. 1686), poet
- Mihail G. Boiagi, (1780 – ca.1842) an Aromanian grammarian and professor
- László Szalay (1813–1864) a Hungarian statesman and historian.
- József Eötvös (1813–1871) a Hungarian writer and statesman.
- Ignaz Philipp Semmelweis (1818–1865), a Hungarian physician and scientist. An early pioneer of antiseptic procedures, he proposed doctors start the practice of disinfecting their hands.
- Kornelije Stanković, (1831–1865) notable Serbian composer, born and died in Buda
- Edmund Hauler (1859–1941), classicist and philologist

== Twin cities ==
- Capestrano, Italy

== Gallery ==
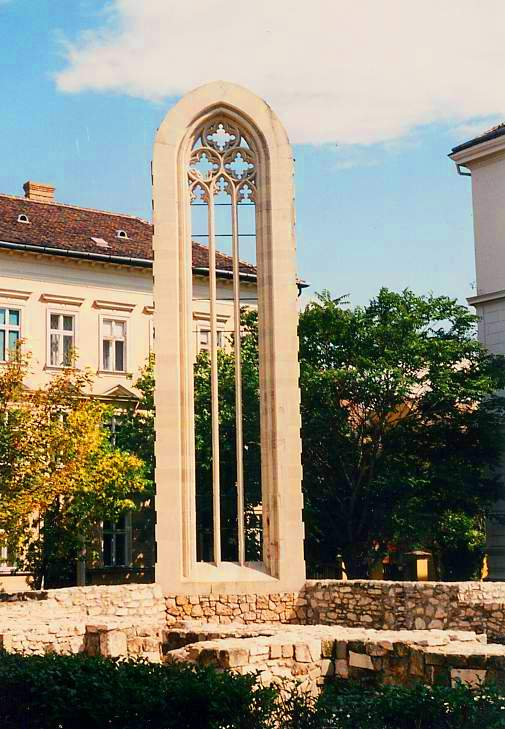
Mary Magdalene Church, Buda

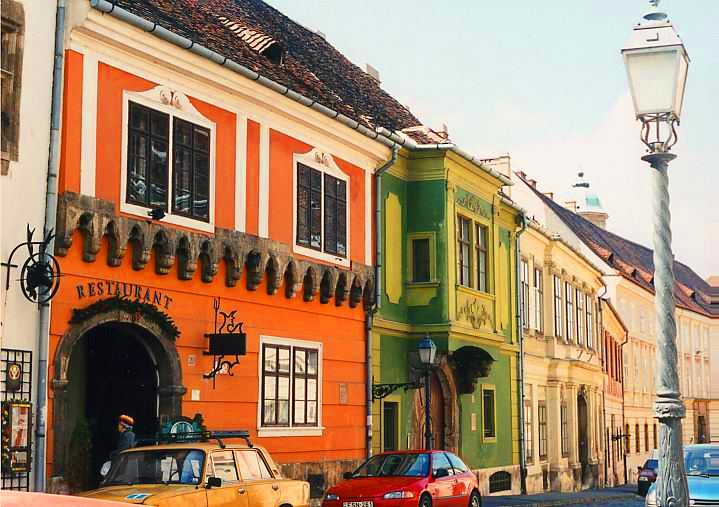
Országház utca (= Parliament Street)

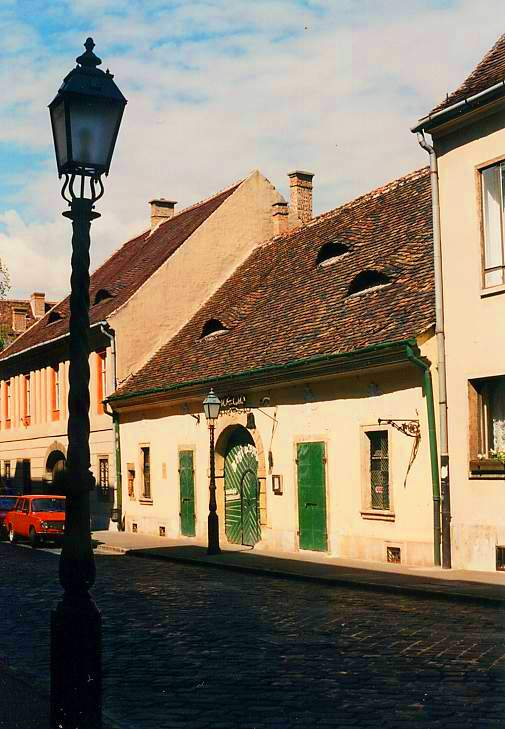
Old Parliament Inn

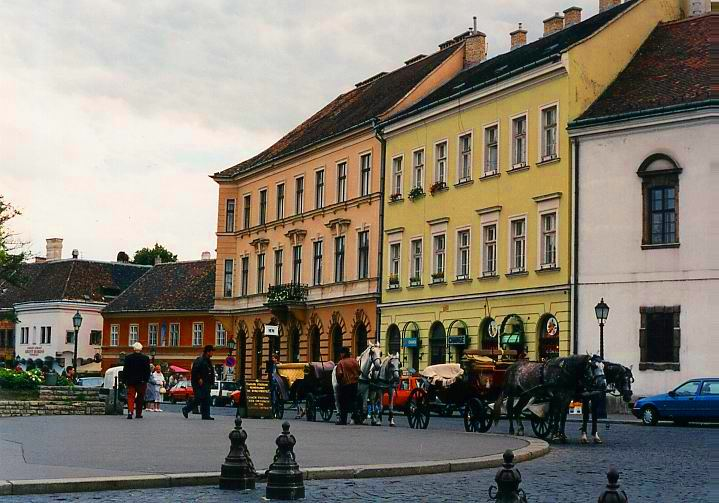
Buda Main Plaza

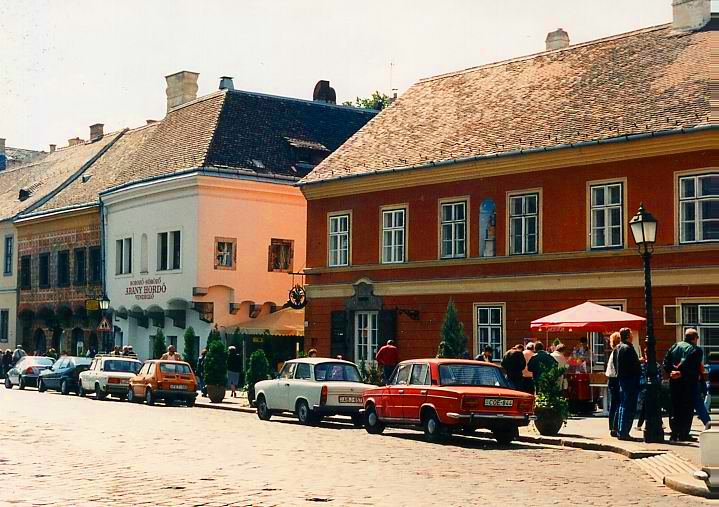
Arany Hordó Inn

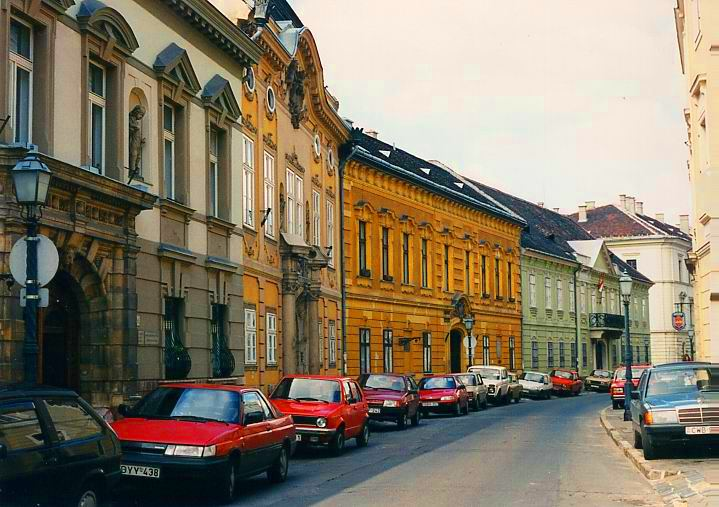
Tárnok utca (= Treasury Street)

== See also ==
- Pest
- Óbuda
- Buda Castle
