= Aaron ben Joseph ha-Levi =

Spanish Talmudist

Aaron ben Joseph ha-Levi was a Sephardic Jew who was a Talmudist and critic; a direct descendant of Zerahiah Ha-Levi, and probably, like him, a native of Girona, Spain; flourished at the end of the thirteenth century; died before 1303. About the middle of the thirteenth century he studied under Naḥmanides, at Girona, where he also met, as a fellow pupil, Solomon ben Adret, who later came to be his opponent. Aaron especially mentions among his teachers his brother Phinehas (who migrated later to Canet near Perpignan, after which place he is surnamed), and his nephew Isaac, the son of his brother Benveniste. His life appears to have been spent in Spain. In 1285 he was rabbi in Saragossa, where he was so highly respected that Nissim ben Reuben, in 1350, did not dare to annul a decision given by Aaron to a community in that city, even though he considered it illegal (Isaac ben Sheshet, responsa, No. 390). About 1291 Aaron lived for a short time in Toledo. The assertion of some modern historians that, when advanced in age, he emigrated to Provence, is based on a misunderstanding of Meiri (see below), where the correct reading is instead of, and instead of (see Neubauer's edition, p. 230).

According to Isaac de Lattes, Aaron wrote commentaries on most of the treatises in the Talmud, of which but few exist to-day; namely, those on the treatises Brachot, Beẓah and Ketubot, also commentaries on the Halakot of Alfasi, of which the portions on Berakot and Ta'anit have been published by S. and N. Bamberger (Mentz, 1874) under the title "Peḳudat ha-Lewiyim." He wrote also several compendiums of laws concerning the precepts of various rituals. The "Precepts Concerning Wine," which is added to the work "'Abodat ha-Ḳodesh" by his opponent, Solomon ben Adret (Venice, 1602), is the only one published; another part is in manuscript in the Bodleian Library. His pupil Yom-Ṭob Ashbili (that is, of Seville) has preserved, in his novellæ ("Ḥiddushim") to the Talmud, many of the explanations of Aaron. The reputation of Aaron as a high Talmudic authority did not arise from any of the above works, which were not widely published, but from his "Bedeḳ ha-Bayit" (Breaches of the House), a criticism of the great work, "Torat ha-Bayit" (The Precept of the House), written by Solomon ben Adret.

Several times during his rabbinical career Aaron came into conflict on important points with Solomon ben Adret, the leading spirit of the Spanish Jews. On one occasion they failed to agree in the decision of a subject submitted to them, and neither being willing to acknowledge the superiority of the other, they were obliged to refer the case to the French authorities.

No sooner had Adret published his important work, "Torat ha-Bayit," than Aaron submitted it to a severe but just criticism. It reflects great credit upon Aaron that he treated his opponent with the greatest deference, never allowing himself to descend to personalities. The same thing can not be said of Adret's counter-criticism, "Mishmeret ha-Bayit" (Defense of the House), which is written in an acrimonious, not to say malicious, tone: that may perhaps be the reason that Adret published it anonymously, for it was only in later years that he acknowledged his authorship. These two distinguished pupils of Naḥmanides differed also in many other points. While Adret inclined to mysticism, Aaron treated important dogmatical questions in a fashion which was distasteful to the orthodox, as, for instance, his opinion on resurrection. Without denying resurrection, he maintained that the body would have to undergo certain changes until it acquired an ethereal nature which would permit it to appear before God and to look upon the glory of heaven. Aaron was at first credited with the authorship of the "Sefer ha-Ḥinnuk"—an error corrected by Rosin ("Ein Compendium der Jüdischen Gesetzeskunde," 1871, pp. 131–134). See Aaron ha-Levi of Barcelona.
