= Rishon =

Rishon may refer to:

- Singular for Rishonim, "the First Ones", early Rabbis and Poskim
- Rishon LeZion, a city in Israel
- Rishon model, a preonic model of sub-quark particle physics.
- Rishon Bhadain (born 1998), Mauritian politician
- Shais Rishon, African-American Orthodox rabbi, activist, and writer
- Yom Rishon, "first day", the first day of the Hebrew alphabet
