= Abba Mari =

Provençal rabbi

Abba Mari ben Moses ben Joseph אַבָּא מָרִי בַּר מֹשֶׁה הַיַּרְחִי
- Born: c. 1250; Lunel, France
- Died: c. 1306
- Known for: Provençal Rabbi and author of Minḥat Ḳenaot

Abba Mari ben Moses ben Joseph, was a Provençal rabbi, born at Lunel, near Montpellier, towards the end of the 13th century. He is also known as Yarhi from his birthplace (Hebrew Yerah, i.e. moon, lune), and he further took the name Astruc, Don Astruc or En Astruc of Lunel from the word "astruc" meaning lucky.

The descendant of men learned in rabbinic lore, Abba Mari devoted himself to the study of theology and philosophy, and made himself acquainted with the writings of Moses Maimonides and Nachmanides as well as with the Talmud.

In Montpellier, where he lived from 1303 to 1306, he was much distressed by the prevalence of Aristotelian rationalism, which (in his opinion) through the medium of the works of Maimonides, threatened the authority of the Old Testament, obedience to the law, and the belief in miracles and revelation. He therefore, in a series of letters (afterwards collected under the title Minhat Kenaot, i.e., "Offering of Zealotry") called upon the famous rabbi Solomon ben Aderet of Barcelona to come to the aid of orthodoxy. Ben Aderet, with the approval of other prominent Spanish rabbis, sent a letter to the community at Montpellier proposing to forbid the study of philosophy to those who were less than twenty-five years of age, and, in spite of keen opposition from the liberal section, a decree in this sense was issued by Ben Aderet in 1305. The result was a great schism among the Jews of Spain and southern France, and a new impulse was given to the study of philosophy by the unauthorized interference of the Spanish rabbis.

Upon the expulsion of the Jews from France by Philip IV in 1306, Abba Mari settled at Perpignan, where he published the letters connected with the controversy. His subsequent history is unknown. Beside the letters, he was the author of liturgical poetry and works on civil law.

== Defender of Law and Tradition ==
Leader of the opposition to the rationalism of the Maimonists in the Montpellier controversy of 1303–1306; born at Lunel—hence his name, Yarḥi (from Yeraḥ = Moon = Lune). He was a descendant of Meshullam ben Jacob of Lunel, one of whose five sons was Joseph, the grandfather of Abba Mari, who, like his son Moses, the father of Abba Mari, was highly respected for both his rabbinical learning and his general erudition. Abba Mari moved to Montpellier, where, to his chagrin, he found the study of rabbinical lore greatly neglected by the young, who devoted all of their time and zeal to science and philosophy. The rationalistic method pursued by the new school of Maimonists (including Levi ben Abraham ben Chayyim of Villefranche, near the town of Perpignan, and Jacob Anatolio) especially provoked his indignation; for the sermons preached and the works published by them seemed to resolve the entire Scriptures into allegory and threatened to undermine the Jewish faith and the observance of the Law and tradition. He was not without some philosophical training. He mentions even with reverence the name of Maimonides, whose work he possessed and studied; but he was more inclined toward the mysticism of Nachmanides. Above all, he was a thorough believer in revelation and in a divine providence, and was a sincere, law-observing follower of rabbinical Judaism. He would not allow Aristotle, "the searcher after God among the heathen," to be ranked with Moses.

== Opponent of Rationalism ==
Abba Mari possessed considerable Talmudic knowledge and some poetical talent; but his zeal for the Law made him an agitator and a persecutor of all the advocates of liberal thought. Being himself without sufficient authority, he appealed in a number of letters, afterward published under the title of Minḥat Ḳenaot (Jealousy Offering), to Solomon ben Adret of Barcelona, the most influential rabbi of the time, to use his powerful authority to check the source of evil by hurling his anathema against both the study of philosophy and the allegorical interpretations of the Bible, which did away with all belief in miracles. Ben Adret, while reluctant to interfere in the affairs of other congregations, was in perfect accord with Abba Mari as to the danger of the new rationalistic systems, and advised him to organize the conservative forces in defense of the Law. Abba Mari, through Ben Adret's aid, obtained allies eager to take up his cause, among whom were Don Bonafoux Vidal of Barcelona and his brother, Don Crescas Vidal, then in Perpignan. The proposition of the latter to prohibit, under penalty of excommunication, the study of philosophy and any of the sciences except medicine, by one under thirty years of age, met with the approval of Ben Adret. Accordingly, Ben Adret addressed to the congregation of Montpellier a letter, signed by fifteen other rabbis, proposing to issue a decree pronouncing the anathema against all those who should pursue the study of philosophy and science before due maturity in age and in rabbinical knowledge. On a Sabbath in September, 1304, the letter was to be read before the congregation, when Jacob Machir Don Profiat Tibbon, the renowned astronomical and mathematical writer, entered his protest against such unlawful interference by the Barcelona rabbis, and a schism ensued. Twenty-eight members signed Abba Mari's letter of approval; the others, under Tibbon's leadership, addressed another letter to Ben Adret, rebuking him and his colleagues for condemning a whole community without knowledge of the local conditions. Finally, the agitation for and against the liberal ideas brought about a schism in the entire Jewish population in southern France and Spain.

Encouraged, however, by letters signed by the rabbis of Argentière and Lunel, and particularly by the support of Kalonymus ben Todros, the nasi of Narbonne, and of the eminent Talmudist Asheri of Toledo, Ben Adret issued a decree, signed by thirty-three rabbis of Barcelona, excommunicating those who should, within the next fifty years, study physics or metaphysics before their thirtieth year of age (basing his action on the principle laid down by Maimonides, Guide for the Perplexed part one chapter 34), and had the order promulgated in the synagogue on Sabbath, July 26, 1305. When this heresy-decree, to be made effective, was forwarded to other congregations for approval, the friends of liberal thought, under the leadership of the Tibbonites, issued a counter-ban, and the conflict threatened to assume a serious character, as blind party zeal (this time on the liberal side) did not shrink from asking the civil powers to intervene. But an unlooked-for calamity brought the warfare to an end. The expulsion of the Jews from France by Philip IV ("the Fair"), in, caused the Jews of Montpellier to take refuge, partly in Provence, partly in Perpignan and partly in Mallorca. Consequently, Abba Mari removed first to Arles, and, within the same year, to Perpignan, where he finally settled and disappeared from public view. There he published his correspondence with Ben Adret and his colleagues.

== Minchat Kenaot ==
Abba Mari collected the correspondence and added to each letter a few explanatory notes. Of this collection, called Minchat Kenaot, several manuscript copies survive (at Oxford; Paris; Günzburg Libr., Saint Petersburg; Parma; Ramsgate Montefiore College Library; and Turin). Some of these are mere fragments. The printed edition (Presburg, 1838), prepared by M. L. Bislichis, contains: (1) Preface; (2) a treatise of eighteen chapters on the incorporeality of God; (3) correspondence; (4) a treatise, called Sefer ha-Yarḥi, included also in letter 58; (5) a defense of The Guide and its author by Shem-Tob Palquera.

As the three cardinal doctrines of Judaism, Abba Mari accentuates: (1) Recognition of God's existence and of His absolute sovereignty, eternity, unity, and incorporeality, as taught in revelation, especially in the Ten Commandments; (2) the world's creation by Him out of nothing, as evidenced particularly by the Sabbath; (3) special Divine providence, as manifested in the Biblical miracles. In the preface, Abba Mari explains his object in collecting the correspondence; and in the treatise which follows he shows that the study of philosophy, useful in itself as a help toward the acquisition of the knowledge of God, requires great caution, lest we be misled by the Aristotelian philosophy or its false interpretation, as regards the principles of creatio ex nihilo and divine individual providence. The manuscripts include twelve letters which are not included in the printed edition of Minḥat Ḳenaot.

The correspondence refers mainly to the proposed restriction of the study of the Aristotelian philosophy. Casually, other theological questions are discussed. For example, letters 1, 5, and 8 contain a discussion on the question, whether the use of a piece of metal with the figure of a lion, as a talisman, is permitted by Jewish law for medicinal purposes, or is prohibited as idolatrous. In letter 131, Abba Mari mourns the death of Ben Adret, and in letter 132 he sends words of sympathy to the congregation of Perpignan, on the death of Don Vidal Shlomo (the Meiri) and Rabbi Meshullam. Letter 33 contains the statement of Abba Mari that two letters which he desired to insert could not be discovered by him. MS. Ramsgate, No. 52, has the same statement, but also the two letters missing in the printed copies. In Sefer haYarchi, Abba Mari refers to the great caution shown by the rabbis of old regarding the teaching of the philosophical mysteries, and recommended by men like the Hai Gaon, Maimonides, and David Kimhi. A response of Abba Mari on a ritual question is contained in MS. Ramsgate, No. 136; and Zunz mentions a ḳinah composed by Abba Mari.

Minchat Kenaot is instructive reading for the historian because it throws much light upon the deeper problems which agitated Judaism, the question of the relation of religion to the philosophy of the age, which neither the zeal of the fanatic nor the bold attitude of the liberal-minded could solve in any fixed dogmatic form or by any anathema, as the independent spirit of the congregations refused to accord to the rabbis the power possessed by the Church of dictating to the people what they should believe or respect.

At the close of the work are added several eulogies written by Abba Mari on Ben Adret (who died in 1310), and on Don Vidal, Solomon of Perpignan, and Don Bonet Crescas of Lunel.
