= Ludwig Venetianer =

Hungarian rabbi and writer

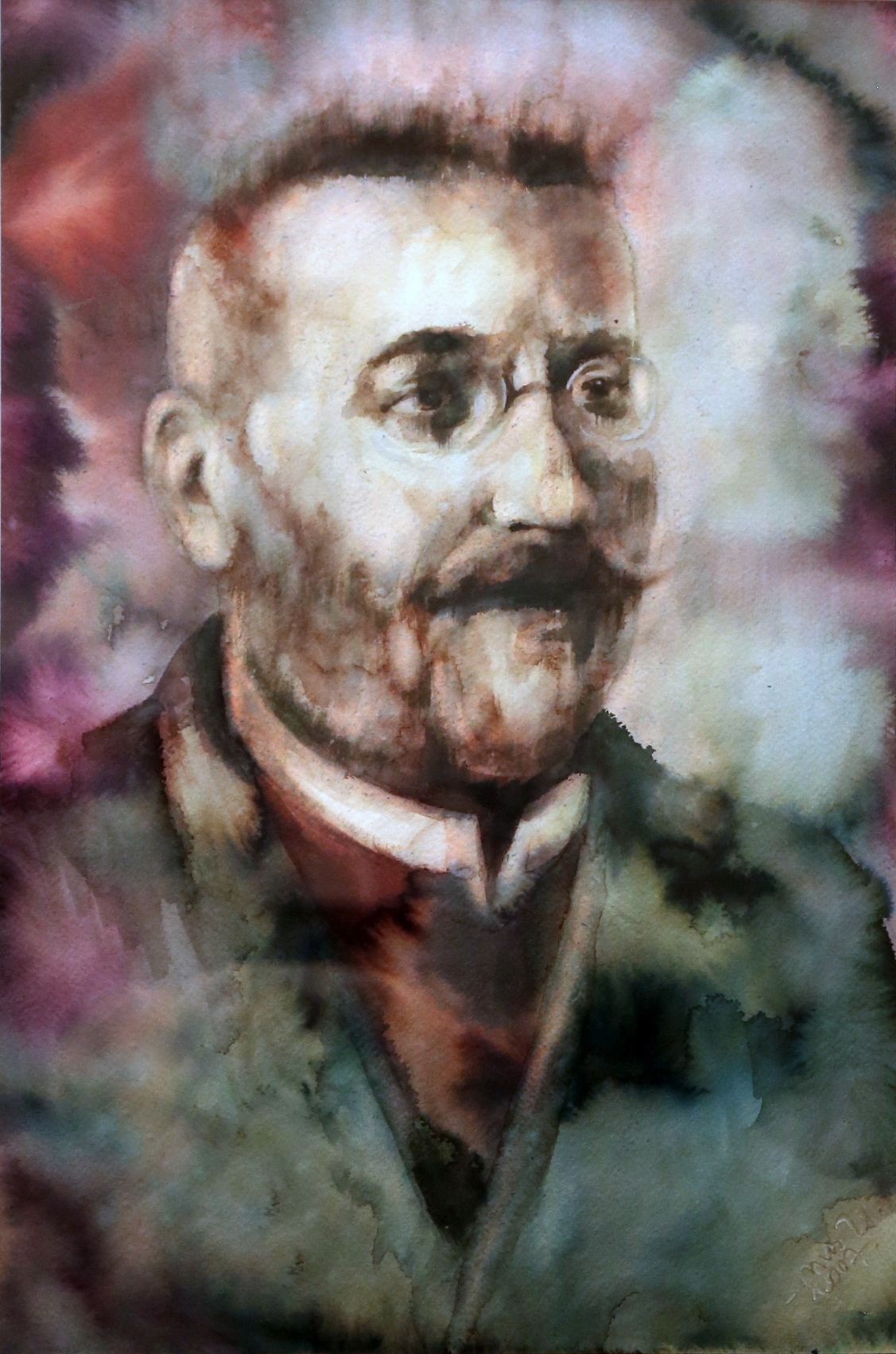
Venetianer Lajos

Ludwig Venetianer (Hungarian: Venetianer Lajos) (May 19, 1867 in Kecskemét – November 25, 1922 in Újpest) was a Hungarian rabbi and writer.

Venetianer was born in Kecskemét. He studied at the rabbinical seminary and the University of Budapest, at the Jewish Theological Seminary (Breslau) and the University of Breslau, 1888–89 (Ph.D. 1890, Budapest). Receiving his diploma as rabbi from the Budapest University of Jewish Studies in 1892, he officiated as rabbi at Somogy-Csurgó from that year to 1895, holding at the same time the chair of Hungarian and German literatures at the Evangelical Reform Gymnasium of that city. In 1895 he was called to the rabbinate of Lugos, and in the following year to the rabbinate of Újpest near Budapest.

== Literary works ==
Venetianer is the author of:

- A Fokozatok Könyve, on the sources of Shem-Tov ibn Falaquera (Szeged, 1890)
- A Felebaráti Szeretet a Zsidó Ethikában, on charity in Jewish ethics (Budapest, 1891)
- Das Buch der Grade von Schemtob ibn Falaquera (Berlin, 1894)
- Die Eleusinischen Mysterien im Jerusalemischen Tempel (Frankfurt am Main, 1897)
- A Héber-Magyar Összehasonlitó Nyelvészet, a history of Hebrew-Hungarian philology (Budapest, 1898)
- A Zsidóság Szervezete az Európai Államokban, a history of the Jewish communal constitution in Europe (ib. 1901)
- A Magyar Zsidóság Szervezetéről, a work treating of the organization of the Jews in Hungary (ib. 1903)
- A Zsidóság Eszméi és Tanai, a treatise on the conceptions and doctrines of Judaism (ib. 1904).
- Ludwig Venetianer: Jüdisches im Christentum (Frankfurt am Main, 1913). Marianna Varga, Erinnerung an Ludwig Venetianer, Emlékezés Venetianer Lajosra, Tanulmány, Studie. Deutsch, Ungarisch. Peter W. Metzler Verlag (Duisburg, 2004) ISBN 978-3-936283-08-2
- Ludwig Venetianer: Die Messiashoffnung des Judenthums, Vortrag (Wien, 1915), Peter W. Metzler Verlag, (Duisburg, 2006) ISBN 978-3-936283-09-9
- Ludwig Venetianer: Die Messiashoffnung des Judentums, Vortrag (Wien, 1915), Peter W. Metzler Verlag, (Duisburg, 2010) ISBN 978-3-936283-11-2
- Lajos / Ludwig Venetianer: Kossuth Lajos, Emlekbeszed, Gedenkansprache (Somogy Csurgói, 1894). 1848 Marczius 15., Ünnepi Beszed, Festansprache (Ujpest, 1898). Die Messiashoffnung des Judentums, Vortrag (Wien, 1915), Peter W. Metzler Verlag, (Duisburg, 2010) ISBN 978-3-936283-12-9

He has also contributed numerous articles to periodicals, including Egyenlőség, Társadalmi Lapok, Jahrbuch des Litteraturvereins, Pesti Napló, Magyar-Zsidó Szemle, Orientalistische Litteraturzeitung, Ethnographia, and Bloch's Festschrift (supplement to the Österreichische Wochenschrift); and he has published some sermons in Hungarian.

== Bibliography ==
- A. Csurgói, Tanitó-Képző Intézet Története, p. 45;
- Gesch. des Jüdisch-Theologischen Seminars in Breslau, p. 199.
- Marianna Varga, Ludwig Venetianer: Jüdisches im Christentum (Frankfurt am Main, 1913). Erinnerung an Ludwig Venetianer Emlékezés Venetianer Lajosra. Tanulmány Studie, Deutsch, Ungarisch. (Peter W. Metzler Verlag, Duisburg 2004) ISBN 978-3-936283-08-2
- Ludwig Venetianer: Die Messiashoffnung des Judenthums. Vortrag (Wien, 1915). (Peter W. Metzler Verlag, Duisburg 2006) ISBN 978-3-936283-09-9 http://www.metzler-verlag.de
