= Aaron ben Joseph of Buda =

17th Century Judæo-German poet

Aaron ben Joseph of Buda was a Judæo-German poet of the seventeenth century, who was captured in the city of Buda, the capital of Hungary, on September 2, 1686, when the imperial troops, under the command of Duke Charles of Lorraine, finally wrested it from the power of the Turks. He was the author of "Ein Schoen Neu Lied von Ofen" (Bak, Prague, 1686), a Judæo-German poem describing the fate of the Jews of Buda, and especially laudatory of one Sender ben Joseph Tausk, to whom the poem is dedicated.
