= Nathan ben Eliezer ha-Me'ati =

Italian Jewish translator

Nathan ben Eliezer ha-Me'ati was an Italian Jewish translator, the earliest known member of the Ha-Me'ati family that flourished at Rome in the thirteenth and fourteenth centuries. He was called the "Prince of Translators" and the "Italian Tibbonide".

== Life ==
He lived in Rome from 1279 to 1283. His native place seems to have been Cento, hence his name "Me'ati," which is the Hebrew equivalent of "Cento" (= 100). After acquiring many languages during long wanderings, he settled at Rome, where he translated scientific and especially medical works from Arabic into Hebrew. This was to take the place, as he declared, of the medical literature of the Jews which had existed even at the time of Solomon but had been lost, and to silence the mockery of the Christians, who said that the Jews had no such literature.

== Works ==
His translations are:

- 'Ammar ben 'Ali al-Mausuli's "Al-Muntaḥib fi 'Ilaj al-'Ain," on the treatment of the eye
- The Canon of Avicenna
- The aphorisms of Hippocrates with Galen's commentary
- The aphorisms of Maimonides
- A selection from various authors, chiefly from Galen, published under the title Pirḳe Mosheh, Lemberg, 1804.

Many anonymous translations are attributed to Me'ati, among them: (1) Razi's treatise on bleeding, "Ma'amar be-Haḳḳazah"; (2) Zahrawi's Kitab al-Taṣrif (Hebrew title, "Ẓeruf"); (3) Ibn Zuhr's "Kitab al-Aghdhiyah" (Hebrew title, "Sefer ha-Ṃezonot"); (4) an anonymous work on the causes of eclipses entitled "Ma'amar 'al Sibbot Liḳḳut ha-Me'orot."
