= Eliezer ben Samuel of Verona =

Italian Jewish tosafist

Eliezer ben Samuel of Verona (lived about the beginning of the thirteenth century) was an Italian Jewish tosafist.

He was a disciple of Rabbi Isaac the elder, of Dampierre, Aube, and grandfather of the philosopher and physician Hillel ben Samuel. He had sanctioned the second marriage of a young woman whose husband had probably, though not certainly, perished by shipwreck. But Eliezer ben Joel HaLevi refused to endorse the permission, and a protracted controversy resulted, into which other rabbis were drawn.

Eliezer ben Samuel is often quoted on Biblical and halakhic questions. Mordechai ben Hillel, in speaking of Eliezer, calls him "Eliezer of Verdun," though undoubtedly meaning "Verona."
