= Shem-Tov ibn Falaquera =

Medieval Spanish Jewish philosopher

Shem-Tov ben Joseph ibn Falaquera, also spelled Palquera (Hebrew: שם טוב בן יוסף אבן פלקירה; 1225 – c. 1290), was a Spanish Jewish philosopher, poet, and commentator. A vast body of work is attributed to Falaquera, including encyclopedias of Arabic and Greek philosophies, maqamas, some 20,000 poetic verses, and commentaries on Maimonides’ Guide to the Perplexed. The common theme in Falaquera’s writing was to encourage observant Jews to study philosophy and to appreciate the harmony that existed between Torah and rational truth learned in philosophy. While Falaquera did not advocate teaching the secrets of science and divine sciences to every man, he did advocate the teaching of these truths to a broader range of educated Jewish males than previous proponents of rationalist thinking. He authored a Medieval Hebrew philosophical-scientific encyclopedia, De'ot ha-Filosofim (The Opinions of the Philosophers) (ca. 1270), which consists of a detailed theoretical, and not merely descriptive, treatment of zoology, botany and mineralogy, comparable to that of Albertus Magnus.

== Biography ==
Although not much is known about his personal life, it is believed that Falaquera’s Sefer ha-Mevakkesh, The Book of the Seeker, was a semi-autobiographical work representing a time in Falaquera’s life when he underwent a mid-life crisis and moved away from his youthful poetry towards more intellectual works. From this book and other writings it is assumed that Falaquera was never married due to the views on women he expressed. Furthermore, there is no information regarding how he supported himself, although references to poverty in the Sefer ha-Mevakkesh and other writings may signify his own personal destitution. Another note regarding the tensions that existed between the Jews and non-Jewish nations during Falaquera’s time is seen in the Megillat ha-Zikkaron and a comment in the Sefer ha-Mevakkesh about the “difficult times under the powerful hand of the non-Jewish nations who prevailed over us.”

One of the biggest criticisms by historians concerning Falaquera is that he was not original. Falaquera would not have taken issue with these complaints since he saw his purpose as clarifying, interpreting, and teaching older established philosophical systems to a broader audience of educated Jews. In order to accomplish this task, Falaquera produced many translations and compilations of Greek and Arabic philosophical texts into Hebrew. However, Falaquera did not merely transcribe other texts. He would paraphrase, edit, and weave in commentaries from other authors in order to make the texts more comprehensible and more palatable to an observant educated Jewish audience. In addition, inspired by the debate between David Kimhi, a Maimonidean, and Judah Alfakhar, an anti-Maimonidean, Falaquera wrote the Iggeret ha-Vikku’ah, The Epistle of the Debate, in order to counter the objections of anti-rationalist thinkers and to persuade them of the value of studying philosophy and science. However, this goal was ultimately not successful as evidenced by continued further controversies surrounding Maimonides and rationalist studies. In the Iggeret ha-Vikku’ah, a debate between a traditionally observant Jew, the pietist, and a Jew educated in philosophy, the scholar, is described. Over the course of the dialogue, the scholar showed the pietist that many elements of philosophy do not conflict with the Torah and in fact provide a better understanding of it. Furthermore, the scholar shows the pietist that philosophy should be studied by those educated Jews who will know what teachings of philosophy to disregard and what teachings to incorporate into their understanding.

Falaquera also wrote one of the first commentaries on Maimonides’ Guide to the Perplexed in order to clarify sections that he felt people were misreading or misinterpreting, despite Maimonides urgings in the Guide that readers not comment or expound upon his work. Falaquera used his robust knowledge of sources to both strengthen and part from Maimonides’ teachings according to his own beliefs. Indeed, Falaquera’s commentary contains some viewpoints in his own name which is rarely seen in Falaquera’s other works.

Falaquera is a defender of philosophy and argues it is compatible with the Torah, and that ultimately non-Jews learned from the sages such as Abraham, Shem, Eber, and Solomon. He says Solomon and the priests of Jerusalem taught Claudius Ptolemy, and that Solomon was the author of 65 books.

== Works ==
- Iggeret Hanhagat ha-Guf we ha-Nefesh, a treatise in verse on the control of the body and the soul.
- Ẓeri ha-Yagon, on resignation and fortitude under misfortune. Cremona, 1550.
- Iggeret ha-Wikkuaḥ, a dialogue between an orthodox Jew and a philosopher on the harmony of philosophy and religion, being an attempt to prove that not only the Bible, but even the Talmud, is in perfect accord with philosophy. Prague, 1810.
- Reshit Ḥokhmah, treating of moral duties (and giving the so-called "ethical epistles" of Aristotle), of the sciences, and of the necessity of studying philosophy. In this Shem-Ṭob treats of the philosophy of Aristotle and Plato. This and the preceding work have been translated into Latin (Bibliothèque Nationale, Paris, MS. Latin, No. 6691A).
- Sefer ha-Ma'alot, on the different degrees of human perfection; ed. L. Venetianer, 1891.
- Ha-Mebaḳḳesh, a survey of human knowledge in the form of a dialogue in rimed prose interspersed with verse. This work is a remodeling of the Reshit Ḥokmah. Amsterdam, 1779.
- Sefer ha-Nefesh, a psychological treatise according to the Arabian Peripatetics, especially Avicenna, inspired by Tagmulé ha-Nefesh by Hillel of Verona. Brody, 1835.
- Moreh ha-Moreh, commentary on the philosophical part of the Moreh Nebukim (Guide to the Perplexed) of Maimonides, with an appendix containing corrections of the Hebrew translation of Samuel ibn Tibbon. Presburg, 1837.
- Letter in defense of the Moreh Nebukim, which had been attacked by several French rabbis; published in the Minḥat Ḳena'ot. Presburg, 1838.
- Extracts from Ibn Gabirol's Meḳor Ḥayyim, published by Solomon Munk in his Mélanges de Philosophie Juive et Arabe. Paris, 1859.
- De'ot ha-Filusufim, containing Aristotle's Physics and Metaphysics according to Ibn Roshd's interpretations (Steinschneider, Cat. Hebr. MSS. Leyden, No. 20).
- Iggeret ha-Musar, a compilation of ethical sentences (comp. Orient, Lit. 1879, p. 79).
- Megillat ha-Zikkaron, a historical work, no longer in existence, quoted in the Mebaḳḳesh.
- Iggeret ha-Ḥalom, a treatise on dreams, mentioned in Moreh ha-Moreh, iii, ch. 19, p. 131.

== Jewish Encyclopedia bibliography ==
- Salomon Munk, Mélanges de Philosophie Juive et Arabe, pp. 494–496;
- Ernest Renan, Averroès et l'Averroïsme, pp. 183, 187;
- David Kaufmann, Studien über Salomon ibn Gabirol 1899, pp. 1–3;
- Moritz Steinschneider, Catalogus Librorum Hebræorum in Bibliotheca Bodleiana cols. 2537-2548;
- idem, Hebräische Übersetzungen, pp. 8, 18, 37, 356, 380, 422;
- Moritz Güdemann, Das Jüdische Unterrichtswesen, i. 155-157;
- Heinrich Grätz, Geschichte der Juden, vii. 219 et seq.;
- Mattityahu Strashun, Pirḥe Ẓafon, i. 46;
- L. Venetianer, Semtob ibn Fala-Kéra, in Magyar Zsido Szemle, 1890, viii. 74-82, 144-155
