= Yonah Gerondi =

Jewish historical religious figure

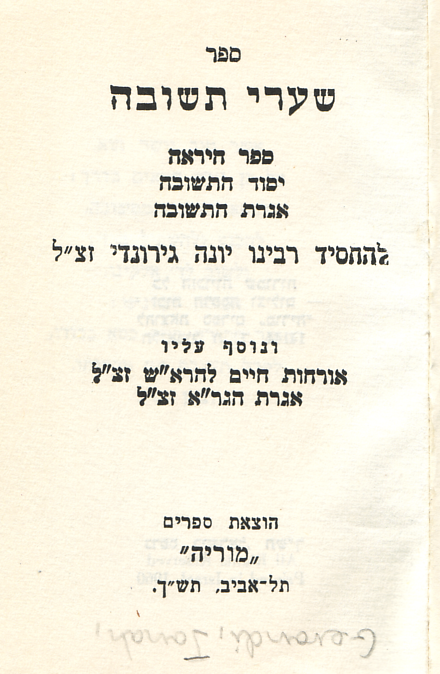
Title page from Sefer Shaarei Teshuvah (1960 pocket edition) by Yonah Gerondi (1180-1263), first published in 1505.

Jonah ben Abraham Gerondi (Hebrew: יוֹנָה בֶּן־אַבְרָהָם גִירוֹנְדִי, romanized: Yōnā bēn-ʾAvrāhām Gīrōndī, lit. 'Jonah son of Abraham the Gironan'; (1180-1264), also known as Jonah of Girona and Rabbeinu Yonah (רבינו יונה), was a Catalan rabbi and moralist, cousin of Nahmanides. He is most famous for his ethical work The Gates of Repentance (Hebrew: שערי תשובה).

== Biography ==
Much of what is known about his life comes from a responsum by Solomon ben Simon Duran, one of his descendants.

Jonah Gerondi came from Girona, in Catalonia (present-day Spain). He was the most prominent pupil of Solomon ben Abraham of Montpellier, the leader of the opponents of Maimonides' philosophical works, and was one of the signers of the ban proclaimed in 1233 against The Guide for the Perplexed and the Sefer ha-Madda. According to his pupil, Hillel ben Samuel, Gerondi was the instigator of the public burning of Maimonides' writings by order of the authorities at Paris in 1233, and the indignation which this aroused among all classes of Jews was mainly directed against him. Subsequently (not forty days afterward, as a tradition has it, but in 1242) when twenty-four wagon-loads of Talmuds were burned at the same place where the philosophical writings of Maimonides had been destroyed, Gerondi saw the folly and danger of appealing to Christian ecclesiastical authorities on questions of Jewish doctrine, and publicly admitted in the synagogue of Montpellier that he had been wrong in all his acts against the works and fame of Maimonides.

As an act of repentance he vowed to travel to Israel and prostrate himself on Maimonides' grave and implore his pardon in the presence of ten men for seven consecutive days. He left France with that intention, but was detained, first in Barcelona and later in Toledo. He remained in Toledo, and became one of the great Talmudical teachers of his time. In all his lectures he made a point of quoting from Maimonides, always mentioning his name with great reverence. Gerondi's sudden death from a rare disease was considered by many as a penalty for not having carried out the plan of his journey to the grave of Maimonides. However, some believe this was only a myth created by the followers of Maimonides. He died in Toledo in the Kingdom of Castile in November 1263. The text of his tombstone was later transcribed by Samuel David Luzzatto, with the month (Cheshvan) and possibly the day of his death being readable.

Solomon of Montpellier
Yonah Gerondi
Hillel of Verona	Solomon ibn Adret

Teachers
Students

== Works ==
Gerondi left many works, of which only a few have been preserved. The Ḥiddushim to Alfasi on Berakhot which are ascribed to "Rabbenu Yonah" were in reality written in Gerondi's name by one, if not several, of his pupils. The Ḥiddushim originally covered the entire work of Alfasi, but only the portion mentioned has been preserved. Gerondi wrote novellæ on the Talmud, which are often mentioned in the responsa and decisions of his pupil Solomon Aderet and of other great rabbis, and some of which are incorporated in the Shiṭṭah Mekubbeẓet of R. Bezalel Ashkenazi. Azulai had in his possession Gerondi's novellæ on the tractates Baba Batra and Sanhedrin, in manuscript. His novellæ on the first-named tractate have since been published under the name Aliyot de-Rabbenu Yonah while those on the last-named tractate form part of the collection of commentaries on the Talmud by ancient authors published by Abraham ben Eliezer ha-Levi under the title Sam Ḥayyim. His commentary on Pirkei Avot was first published by Simḥah Dolitzki of Byelostok (Berlin and Altona, 1848) and was translated into English for the first time by Rabbi David Sedley of TorahLab. The work Issur ve-Heter is wrongly attributed to Gerondi. A commentary by him on Proverbs, which is very highly praised (see Bahya ben Asher's preface to his commentary on the Pentateuch), was published in Berlin in 1910. Among other minor unpublished works known to be his are Megillat Sefarim, Hilkot Ḥanukkah and Hilkot Yom Kippur.

The fame of Gerondi chiefly rests on his moral and ascetic works, which, it is surmised, he wrote to atone for his earlier attacks on Maimonides and to emphasize his repentance. His Iggeret ha-Teshuvah ('Letter on Repentance'), Sha'arei Teshuvah ('Gates of Repentance'), and Sefer ha-Yir'ah belong to the standard Jewish ethical works of the Middle Ages and are still popular among Orthodox Jewish scholars. Sefer ha-Yir'ah was published as early as 1490, as an appendix to Yeshu'ah ben Joseph's Halikot 'Olam. The Sha'arei Teshuvah first appeared in Fano (1505) with the Sefer ha-Yirah, while the Iggeret ha-Teshuvah was first published in Kraków (1586). All have been reprinted many times, separately and together, as well as numerous extracts from them; they have also been translated into Yiddish, Italian and English. A part of the Iggeret ha-Teshuvah (sermon 3) first appeared, under the name Dat ha-Nashim, in Solomon Alami's Iggeret Musar. For an estimate of Gerondi's ethical works and his partial indebtedness to the Sefer Hasidim see Zur Geschichte der Jüdisch-Ethischen Literatur des Mittelalters. He is also supposed to be mentioned, under the name of "R. Jonah," five times in the Tosafot.
