= Crescas Vidal =

French Jewish 14th century philosopher

- Born: Early 14th century Spain

Philosophical work
- Era: Medieval philosophy
- Region: Jewish philosophy
- School: Jewish law, Jewish ethics

Don Crescas Vidal was a French Talmudist in the first half of the fourteenth century.

== Biography ==
Vidal was probably born in Spain.

Vidal went to Perpignan, France shortly before the outbreak of the fourth Maimonidian controversy, as acculturated Jews continued to synthesize Aristotelian thought with traditional Jewish philosophy. Vidal was neutral in this controversy, despite the efforts of his brother Don Bonafos Vidal of Barcelona, and of Solomon ben Aderet, to induce him to reject the new philosophical movement. Although he himself was strictly orthodox, Vidal was sympathetic toward the movement. He believed that while the young should be taught to study the Talmud, they should also have full liberty in the study of philosophy and science. Hence, he incurred the reproach of the orthodox when he emphatically sided with his friend Samuel Sulami, who had given shelter to the ostracized philosopher Levi ben Abraham of Villefranche. Although Vidal did not openly espouse the cause of the unfortunate philosopher, his letters show how deeply he sympathized with him.

Vidal authored commentaries on several Talmudic tractates. One survives in manuscript: the commentary on b. Nedarim usually attributed to Shlomo ibn Adret. Some scholars believe he also wrote the commentary on b. Gittin attributed to ibn Adret, and sections of his commentaries to other tractates are known from citations.
