= Benjamin ben Isaac of Carcassonne =

Benjamin ben Isaac of Carcassonne (Hebrew: בנימין בן יצחק קרקשוני, romanized: Binyamin ben Yitsḥak Karkashoni) was a 14th-century Jewish scholar. He is known for his translation from Latin into Hebrew of Jean de Bourgogne of Liége's work on the corruption of the air by the plague, under the title of 'Ezer elohi, ma'amar be 'ipush ha-avir ve-ha-dever ('Divine Help: A Treatise on the Corruption of the Air and the Plague', c. 1370 or 1399).
