= David Bonafed =

13th Century Spanish Jewish scholar

David ben Reuben Bonafed known as Rabbeinu David was one of the leading Spanish Jewish scholars in the 13th century.

He was a disciple of Nachmanides. His written teachings influenced the writings of the Ran, who frequently cites him, sometimes even copying entire paragraphs of his insights. His style is distinguished by an extensive elaboration of Talmudic topics, in contrast to the concise writing typical of other early authorities.

== Works and contributions ==
Rabbi Bonafed composed novellae (ḥiddushim) on many tractates of the Talmud. Known works include commentaries on Berakhot, Shabbat, Pesachim, Sukkah, Beitzah, Ḥagigah, Ketubot, Kiddushin, Bava Metzia, Bava Batra, Sanhedrin, Makkot, Avodah Zarah, and more. However, extant works available today are only those on Pesachim and Sanhedrin.

His book Chidushai Rabbeinu David on Tractate Pesachim was written around the year 1260.
