= Hillel ben Samuel =

13th-century Italian rabbi and doctor

Hillel ben Samuel (c. 1220 – Forlì, c. 1295) was an Italian physician, philosopher, and Talmudist. He was the grandson of the Talmudic scholar Eliezer ben Samuel of Verona.

== Life ==
He spent his youth at Barcelona, where he studied the Talmud and natural sciences, his teacher in the study of the former being Yonah Gerondi, distinguished for his piety and rabbinical scholarship. Hillel, witnessing Gerondi's sincere repentance for his behavior in the Maimonides controversy at Montpellier, himself began to study Maimonides' religio-philosophical works, of which he became one of the most enthusiastic admirers. He studied medicine at Montpellier, and practised successively at Rome, where he formed a friendship with the papal physician in ordinary, Maestro Isaac Gajo; at Capua (1260–1271), where, having attained fame as physician and philosopher, he lectured on philosophy, among his hearers being Abraham Abulafia; and at Ferrara, where he had relatives.

In his old age he retired to Forlì. In fact, he is also named Hillel of Forlì. Hearing there of Solomon Petit's appearance in Italy with anti-Maimonidean designs, he immediately addressed a letter to Maestro Gajo, vividly describing the disastrous consequences of the first condemnation of Maimonides' works at Montpellier, and imploring him not to join the movement against Maimonides. In order to convince his friend more fully of the absolute groundlessness of the attacks upon the master, Hillel volunteered, with a somewhat exuberant self-complacency, to explain satisfactorily those passages of the Moreh which gave offense. And in order to quiet once and forever the constantly recurring dissensions, Hillel formulated a somewhat fantastic plan, which reveals at the same time his love of justice and his sincere regret that the sorrows of his people were increased by these discords. The plan was as follows: A council, composed of the most eminent rabbis of the East, should convene at Alexandria, and, after listening to the opponents of Maimonides and examining their objections, should give a decision to be accepted by all Jews. It should furthermore depend upon this decision whether Maimonides' works should be burned or should be preserved for further study. Hillel was firmly convinced that the verdict could not be other than favorable to Maimonides.

== Works ==
Hillel, in spite of his wide philosophical knowledge, remained faithful to the teachings of Judaism in their most orthodox interpretation. He even pledged himself to implicit belief in the miraculous stories of the Bible and the Talmud, incurring thereby the censure of the more logical thinker Seraiah ben Isaac (Oẓar Neḥmad, ii.124 et seq.). In his chief work, Tagmule ha-Nefesh (Lyck, 1874), which reviews the philosophical literature, then in vogue, of the Greeks and Arabs, Jews and Christians, Hillel makes constant reference to the Bible and to Talmudic works, advancing his own opinion only when these latter are silent on the subject under consideration.

Hillel is also considered by some as "the first Jewish Thomist". He translated some works of Thomas Aquinas into Hebrew, such as the first part of the De unitate intellectus twenty years after its appearance, and adopted his position on the immortality of the individual soul, not fearing to salute him as "the Maimonides of his age, even capable of responding to questions that the Master had left undecided"

Hillel's works, in addition to the Tagmule ha-Nefesh, include: a commentary to Maimonides' 25 Propositions (Haḳdamot), printed together with the Tagmule ha-Nefesh; a revision of the Liber de Causis, short extracts of which are given in Halberstam's edition of Tagmule ha-Nefesh; Sefer ha-Darbon, on the Haggadah; a philosophical explanation of Canticles, quoted in Tagmule ha-Nefesh; Chirurgia Burni ex Latina in Hebræam Translata (De Rossi MS. No. 1281); and two letters to Maestro Gajo, printed in Ḥemdah Genuzah (1856), pp. 17–22, and in Ṭa'am Zeḳenim, p. 70.
