= Aaron ha-Levi of Barcelona =

Spanish Talmudist and author

- נחשון בן צדוק

Personal life
- Era: 13th century
- Notable work(s): Sefer ha-Chinuch

Religious life
- Religion: Judaism

Aaron ha-Levi of Barcelona (also known as Aaron ben Joseph Sason) was a Spanish Talmudist of the end of the thirteenth century; author of the first book of religious instruction among the Jews of the Middle Ages. Though his work the Sefer ha-Chinuch (Book of Education) was well known, having been repeatedly commented on and republished in more than a dozen editions, it was reserved for Rosin to discover anything accurate concerning the personality of the author. The book itself is anonymous; and the statement by Gedaliah ibn Yaḥyah (dating from the middle of the sixteenth century), that its author was the celebrated Talmudist Aaron ben Joseph ha-Levi, has been generally accepted. It is now, however, certain that the author was a Spanish instructor of youth, of modest position, one who had contented himself with but the faintest allusion to his own identity in symbolically applying to himself the verse Mal. ii. 5, at the end of the prefatory letter to the book; in an old Midrash (Sifra, Shemini, ed. Weiss, i. 45d) this verse is referred to Aaron. He lays no claim to original research. The book was simply intended to impart to Jewish youth a knowledge of the Law, and to present in simple form the principles of Judaism to the unlearned layman. The writer seems to have had this lay-public always before him; and his work is in this respect different from that of his predecessors, Maimonides, Naḥmanides, and Moses of Coucy, from whose works he liberally draws. The Sefer ha-Chinuch is an enumeration of the six hundred and thirteen affirmative and negative precepts of the Mosaic Law, arranged in the order of the weekly lessons (parashot), with their ethical and halakic aspects, based upon rabbinical tradition of the Talmudic and post-Talmudic periods, for which latter feature he relies upon Alfasi, Maimonides, and Naḥmanides as main authorities. His chief and original merit is displayed in the ingenuity and religious fervor with which he dwells upon the ethical side of the Law, avoiding most admirably all abstruse philosophical and mystical theories, such as are only too abundant in his guides, Maimonides and Naḥmanides. The following are some specimens of his method. Upon the precept concerning the treading ox (Deut. xxv. 4) the Sefer ha-Chinuch remarks:

"It is the duty of man to accustom himself to show kindness, compassion, and consideration to his fellow creatures. When we therefore treat considerately even the animals given for our use, and withdraw not from them some of the fruits of what their labor obtains for us, we educate our soul thereby to be all the kinder to our fellow men, and accustom ourselves not to withhold from them what is their due, but to allow them to enjoy with us the result of that to which they have contributed" (par. 601).

Some of his explanations of purely ritual ordinances betray likewise a deep religious sentiment. Thus, he says, the counting (see 'Omer) of the seven weeks between Passover and Pentecost (Lev. xxiii. 15) is intended to cause us to meditate upon the real and deeper meaning of both those festivals. Israel's redemption from Egypt was only the beginning of true freedom for the nation; its full measure was not attained until the Revelation was given, which event is commemorated by the latter festival. On that day Israel may be truly said to have become a free people; therefore let the true Israelite reverentially and lovingly count the very days intervening between the date that brought him bodily liberty and that which perfected it by adding spiritual enfranchisement. Even in the citation of rabbinical traditions and amplifications of the Law, the author displays rare judgment and proper feeling, thus completely justifying the popularity which this book has for centuries enjoyed.

The author's enumeration of the fundamental doctrines ('iḳḳarim) of Judaism is noteworthy; namely, "the eternity, omnipotence, unity, and omniscience of God; creation of the world by God; rewards and punishments for human actions; and the truth of Jewish tradition" (introduction to the Sefer ha-Chinuch). Compared with the familiar principles of faith as enumerated by Maimonides, one is struck by the fact that the Sefer ha-Chinuch, representing the official orthodoxy of the time, mentions neither the unchange-ableness of the Law nor resurrection. This is owing undoubtedly to the aversion of rabbinical Judaism to the Maimonidean attempt to set up dogmas.

The Sefer ha-Chinuch has been translated into Spanish and Latin; the former version seems to have been in existence about a hundred years ago, but has entirely disappeared. An abbreviation of the Latin translation was published by J. H. Hottinger under the title Juris Hebræorum Leges 261 . . . Ductu R. Levi Barcelonitæ, Zurich, 1656, and a French extract under the title, Instruction Religieuse et Morale, by E. Halévy.
