= Levi ben Abraham ben Hayyim =

13th-century French rabbi and encyclopedist

- רבי לוי בן אברהם

Personal life
- Born: c.1240–1250
- Died: 1315 Arles, France
- Parent: Abraham ben Hayyim (father)
- Era: Rishonim
- Notable work: Liviat Chen

Religious life
- Religion: Judaism

Rabbi Levi ben Abraham ben Hayyim (Hebrew: לוי בן אברהם בן חיים מווילפראנש) was a French encyclopedist; champion of the liberal party in Provence in the struggle for the study of secular sciences; born at Villefranche-de-Conflent, Roussillon, between 1240 and 1250; died at or near Arles soon after 1315.

== Biography ==
He was descended from a scholarly family. His father, Abraham ben Ḥayyim, was a Synagogue poet, and rabbi in Narbonne, but he left about 1240 to settle finally in Villefranche. Levi's uncle Reuben ben Ḥayyim, also, like his grandfather, was a scholar. A son of this Reuben ben Ḥayyim was, probably, Samuel ben Reuben of Béziers, who took Levi's part, although in vain, in his conflict with the orthodox party in Provence. Levi himself was the maternal grandfather of the philosopher Levi ben Gershon of Bagnols.

== Life ==
Levi ben Abraham was instructed in Bible and Talmud, and in secular sciences as well, and was soon drawn into the rationalistic current of the time. One of his teachers was a certain Rabbi Jacob, whom he cites as his authority for an astronomical explanation, and who may have been Jacob ben Machir ibn Tibbon. It is probable, also, that Levi was instructed by his uncle Reuben ben Ḥayyim, from whom he quotes an explanation of Gen. i. 3.

Levi left his native city (probably on account of poverty, which oppressed him almost throughout his life), remained for a short time in Perpignan, and then went to Montpellier, where, in 1276, he was engaged in literary pursuits, and earned a scanty living by teaching languages and lecturing. During the heat of the controversy over the study of secular sciences he was at Narbonne, in the house of the wealthy Samuel of Escaleta, who was prominent both as a poet and a scholar. Levi enjoyed his hospitality until, yielding to the pressure of the opposing party, represented especially by Shlomo ibn Aderet, Samuel of Escaleta asked his guest to leave. The latter then sought shelter with his cousin Samuel ben Reuben in Béziers, but was persecuted, apparently, even there. He was excommunicated by the orthodox party, yet, after the conflict was over, in 1315, he found rest and quiet at Arles, where he remained until his death. He has been identified by some with Levi of Perpignan, whom Judah Mosconi, in his super-commentary to Abraham ibn Ezra, characterizes as one of the most prominent of scholars.

== Works ==
Steinschneider points out that a large portion of the scientific works written in Arabic were made accessible in Hebrew translations in the first half of the thirteenth century, and that the entire realm of knowledge began to be treated in encyclopedias in the second half of the same century. Levi ben Abraham wrote two such encyclopedic works, which show the range of knowledge of an educated rationalistic Provençal Jew of that period. The first of these is the "Batte ha-Nefesh weha-Leḥashim," the title of which is taken from Isa. iii. 20. It is a rimed compendium, didactic in tone, of the various sciences, in ten chapters and 1,846 lines, with a few explanatory notes and a preface, also in rimed prose. In the preface to this work, which is frequently found in manuscripts, Levi demonstrates the usefulness of his compendium by pointing out the difficulties which those who are not well acquainted with general literature must surmount in order to acquire a knowledge of the sciences, which are scattered through all sorts of books. He had long cherished the thought of compiling an encyclopedia, but had always been deterred by the fear that the task would prove beyond his power; at last, in 1276, strength was promised him in a vision, whereupon he began the work at Montpellier.

== Encyclopedia. ==
Levi was compelled, by the nature of the work, to limit himself to giving the conclusions of the chief authorities, particularly of Maimonides, whom he follows step by step. Ch. i. treats of ethics. In the paragraphs treating of the history of the diffusion of learning, the author expresses the view that the Greeks and Arabs derived almost their entire scientific culture from the ancient Hebrews, a theory which justified the reading of Greco-Arabic ideas into the Bible (Steinschneider). The following chapters treat of logic (ii.), the Creation (iii.), the soul (iv.), prophecy and the Messianic period (v.; the coming of the Messiah will occur in the year 1345), the mystic theme of the "Merkabah," the divine throne-chariot (vi.), numbers (vii.), astronomy and astrology (viii.), physics (ix.), and metaphysics (x.). After the author himself had found it necessary to provide the difficult verses with explanatory notes (which are not found in all the manuscripts), Solomon de Lunas, probably identical with Solomon ben Menahem Prat (or Porat), wrote, about 1400, a commentary to the "Batte ha-Nefesh weha-Leḥashim."

== "Liviat Chen" ==
The second work of Levi was the "Liviat Chen" or "Sefer ha-Kolel," a "comprehensive book" (encyclopedia). The dates of its beginning and completion are unknown, but it must have been written before the outbreak of the controversy mentioned above. It is divided into two "pillars," called "Jachin" and "Boaz" (after I Kings vii. 21), the first containing five treatises, and the second one. Since no complete manuscript of this work has yet been discovered, any analysis of its contents is naturally uncertain. According to Steinschneider, its six treatises are as follows: (1) logic or arithmetic (?); (2) geometry; (3) astronomy and astrology; (4) physics (?), psychology, and the "theory of intellect"; (5) metaphysics; (6) theology, prophecy, the mysteries of the Law, and belief and the Creation. In the third treatise, the most complete (Paris MS. No. 1047; Vatican MS. No. 383; Neubauer, "Cat. Bodl. Hebr. MSS." No. 2028, and additamenta), the astrological writings of Abraham ibn Ezra are slavishly followed, and the prediction is made that the Messiah will appear in the year 1345. The last, or theological, treatise, which is extant at Oxford, Parma, and Rome, naturally had a greater circulation, and, on account of the author's rationalistic interpretation of the Scriptures, aroused much more opposition than the other sections of the work, which aimed at nothing original and included only what could be found elsewhere.

The teachings which Levi ben Abraham promulgated, both by pen and by speech, although not original with him, naturally aroused the anger of the orthodox. In his hands Abraham and Sarah became symbols of "matter" and "intellect"; the four kings against whom Abraham went to war represented the four faculties of man; Joshua's miracles were symbolically interpreted: they were not actual occurrences; the possibility of a supernatural revelation was doubted; and there were other and similar doctrines that poisoned the naively credulous and religious mind.

== Opposition to his views ==
Orthodox resentment was first shown at Narbonne, where Levi was residing in the house of Samuel of Escaleta. It mattered little that Levi "was in general very reserved and was communicative only to those who shared his views," and that it was not known with certainty whether he was to be reckoned among the orthodox or among the heretics; nor yet that he always put off Don Vidal Creseas, who, although he opposed his teachings, was his personal friend, and had often, but vainly, asked him for his writings. Equally unavailing were his observance of the ceremonial law and his pretense that he occupied himself with philosophical questions only for the sake of being able to cope with heretics (ib. No. 14). Poverty compelled Levi, "who was born under an unlucky star," to teach at this dangerous and critical period and thereby spread his doctrines. Shlomon ibn Aderet, therefore, then the champion of the orthodox party, felt constrained to attack this "arch-heretic, condemned by the voices of all." "A Muslim is dearer far to me than this man," he wrote, "who is not ashamed to say openly that Abraham and the other patriarchs have ceased to exist as real personages and that their places have been filled by philosophical concepts. . . . Levi and his adherents are enemies not only of Judaism, but of every positive religion." In his reply to Levi's letter, in which the latter endeavored to clear himself of the charges brought against him, Shlomon ibn Aderet advised Levi in friendly terms to confine himself to Talmudic sciences; this Levi plainly did not wish to do, and thus he brought excommunication upon himself.

Levi expanded and revised his "Liviat Chen" in Sept., 1315, at Arles, and the manuscript was discovered by Steinschneider.

In addition to these works Levi wrote three others—"Sodot ha-Torah," "Sefer ha-Tekunah," and an astrological treatise. The "Sodot ha-Torah" (Paris MS. No. 1066), which probably was an exposition of the mysteries contained in the Ten Commandments, and which was written before 1276, is said to be lost, but it was probably incorporated, in a revised form, in his "Liviat Chen." The "Sefer ha-Tekunah," on astronomy and chronology, consisted of forty chapters and was written in 1276. The treatise on predictive astrology is entitled "Sha'ar ha-Arba'im be-Koḥot ha-Kokabim," "the fortieth chapter" of the preceding book, although it forms a separate work. They were edited at the same time. The great dependence on Abraham ibn Ezra's astrological opinions shown in this treatise would suggest that it may be the compendium which Levi is said to have made of Ibn Ezra's works. All these smaller treatises seem to have been merely preparatory to the "Liviat Chen," in which they are used.

== Bibliography ==
- Carmoly, La France Israélite, p. 46;
- A. Geiger, in Oẓar Neḥmad, ii. 94 et seq.;
- idem, in He-Ḥaluẓ, ii. 12 et seq.;
- Grätz, Gesch. vii. 219, 223;
- Gross, in Monatsschrift, 1879, p. 428;
- idem, Gallia Judaica, pp. 83, 199, 329, 465;
- Renan-Neubauer, Les Rabbins Français, pp. 628 et seq., 658 et seq.;
- J. Perles, R. Salomo ben Abraham ben Adereth, pp. 13, 22 et seq., 70;
- Steinschneider, in Ersch and Gruber, Encyc. section ii., part 43, pp. 294 et seq. (where all the previous literature on the subject is given).
