= Solomon Alami =

Solomon Alami was a Portuguese-Jewish ethical writer of the 14th and 15th centuries, contemporary of Simon ben Ẓemaḥ Duran (רשב"ץ). He is known through his ethical treatise Iggeret Musar, (Why Catastrophes Come) which he addressed, in the form of a letter, to one of his disciples in 1415.

== Iggeret Musar ==
Alami was an eye-witness of the persecutions of the Jews of Catalonia, Castile, and Aragon in 1391. Alami considers these and other severe trials inflicted upon the Spanish Jews as the effect of, and a punishment for, the moral and religious decadence into which his co-religionists had fallen; and he holds before his brethren a mirror of the moral degeneration extending through all circles of Jewish society. He says in his book:

Let us search for the source of all these trials and sufferings, and we shall find that a state of dissolution prevails in the midst of us; that an evil spirit pervades our camp, which has split us into two parties. There are those of our brethren who expend all their energies in solving Talmudic problems and in writing numberless commentaries and novellæ dealing in minute distinctions and interpretations, full of useless subtleties as thin as cobwebs. They diffuse darkness instead of light, and lower respect for the Law. Others, again, clothe the Torah in strange garments, deck it with Grecian and other anti-Jewish ornaments, and endeavor to harmonize it with philosophy, which can only be detrimental to religion and lead ultimately to its decay. Worse than these, however, are the frivolous persons who have not acquired substantial knowledge, but, relying upon the smattering of Greek that they possess, venture to ridicule tradition and to contemn the commandments of the Holy Law. Such frivolity prevails, above all, among the wealthy. We find these evil qualities among the proud representatives of the congregations, who have grown rich through dealing in money. They cast off everything that reminds them of their Judaism; they seek to dazzle by princely luxury; their wives and daughters array themselves in jewels like princesses; and, swelled with pride, they deem themselves the princes of the land. Therefore the great punishment came: it was inevitable. How much our rich co-religionists could learn from their Christian neighbors! The Christian princes and grandees rival one another in efforts to promote and uphold their religion and to train their youth in the pious sentiments of their ancestors. Our Jewish rich despise their faith, and permit the teachers of religion to eat the bread of sorrow and poverty.

The Hebrew style of the letter is dignified and impassioned, and its moral admonition reveals the noble courage of Alami. Each section of the Iggeret Musar is preceded by a Biblical verse suggesting its contents.

Zunz published an abridged German language translation of part of it in Busch's Jahrbuch für Israeliten, iv. (Vienna, 1844), and this also appeared in his Gesammelte Schriften, ii. 177. An earlier edition appeared in Venice in 1712, as Iggeret ha-Ḥokmah weha-Emunah (Letter on Wisdom and Faith); but the name of the author was corrupted to Solomon ben Laḥmi. The best edition now extant (c.1906) of Alami's work is that issued by Jellinek (Vienna, 1872). Extracts of the Iggeret are given in Or ha-Ḥayyim of Joseph Jaabez and in I.S. Reggio's Ha-Torah weha-Philosophia. On the name Alami, see Steinschneider, Jew. Quart. Rev. xi. 486.
