= Solomon Petit =

13th-century French Tosafist

Solomon Petit was a 13th-century French Tosafist who settled in Acre, Palestine, where he gathered a following of mystics and instigated a new campaign against the philosophical writings of Maimonides. When the Exilarch of Damascus, Yishai ben Chezkiah, learned of the renewed anti-Mainmonist agitation, he threatened Petit with excommunication, which was later invoked. Petit ignored the threats and set off on a mission to Europe to gather signatures from German rabbis endorsing his position.
