= Solomon ben Abraham of Montpellier =

13th century Provençal rabbi and Talmudist

Solomon ben Abraham ben Samuel, also known as Solomon of Montpellier and Shlomo Min Hahar, was a Provençal rabbi and Talmudist of the first half of the 13th century. He was rabbi at Montpellier, and leader of the movement against Maimonides. Meiri quotes him and his associates using the title Hachmei HaHar.

== Conflict with Maimonides ==
When Samuel ibn Tibbon's translation of The Guide for the Perplexed became known in Hachmei Provence, it was freely accepted by some, but others, who adhered firmly to the Talmud, regarded it askance and secretly condemned it. No one, however, dared to express open disapproval of the study of this book until Solomon threw down the gauntlet to the Maimonidists. It would be natural to infer from this proceeding, which divided Judaism into two hostile camps, that Solomon had had a philosophical training which enabled him to recognize the import of Maimonides' ideas, and the contradictions existing between the latter's conception of Judaism and that of the Talmud.

Samuel David Luzzatto argued that Solomon, while a prominent Talmudic authority and of pious, upright character, took up the quarrel with the best intentions but was unable to comprehend Maimonides' views correctly, and had no idea of a philosophical conception of Judaism. He attacked Maimonides on minor, incidental points, e.g., for his refusal to take the aggadic opinions of the Talmud in their simple, often offensive, literal sense; for his explanation of many miracles by means of natural processes; for his description of paradise and hell in other than aggadic colors; and for his conception of the Godhead on other than anthropomorphic lines. As Heinrich Graetz remarked, Solomon, with his "childish views and his clumsy ideas", regarded nearly every word of Maimonides as un-Jewish and heretical.

Solomon knew enough, however, to understand that single-handed he would be powerless to make headway against Maimonides' great authority, which prevailed even after his death, and against his numerous adherents. He therefore sought allies; but his demands for the interdiction of scientific studies found little support among the scholars of southern France, only two of his pupils, Yonah Gerondi (a relative of Nahmanides) and David ben Saul, joining him. These three pronounced (in the beginning of the year 1232) a sentence of excommunication on Maimonides' works, on those who studied them, and on those who construed the Scripture otherwise than literally and interpreted the Aggadah at variance with Rashi. Several rabbis of northern France subsequently confirmed this sentence.

== Reaction ==
This proceeding aroused a storm of indignation among the followers of Maimonides. The communities of Occitania, which stood foremost in point of culture, now excommunicated Solomon and his two disciples and hastened to find allies. The controversy became more fierce, the adherents of both parties increasing and growing more bitter; and the discord threatened to spread throughout all Jewry.

Many of the rabbis of northern France, frightened at the unexpected consequences, retired from the controversy; but Solomon decided upon a shameful and dangerous step. He went to the Dominican Order, and on a certain day in 1233 the citizens of Montpellier saw servants of the Catholic Church, filled with hatred of the Jews and incited by an overpious rabbi, publicly burn the works of the greatest rabbi of post-Talmudic times.

The news of this event filled all the Jews with horror; and Solomon and his pupils were universally condemned, his follower al-Fakhkhar trying vainly to excuse him. But the matter did not rest there; Solomon, believing that he had gained nothing by destroying the works of Maimonides so long as his admirers were still in the field, denounced them to the authorities. It seems, however, that the Maimonidists, with the help of friends in favor at the court of King James I of Aragon, paid Solomon back in his own coin; for several of the calumniators in his party had their tongues cut out. The fate of Solomon himself is not known. Luzzatto infers from the epithet Qadosh applied to him that he also suffered this shameful mutilation.

== See also ==
- Hachmei Provence
