= Shlomo ibn Aderet =

Medieval rabbi, halakhist, and Talmudist

Shlomo ben Avraham ibn Aderet
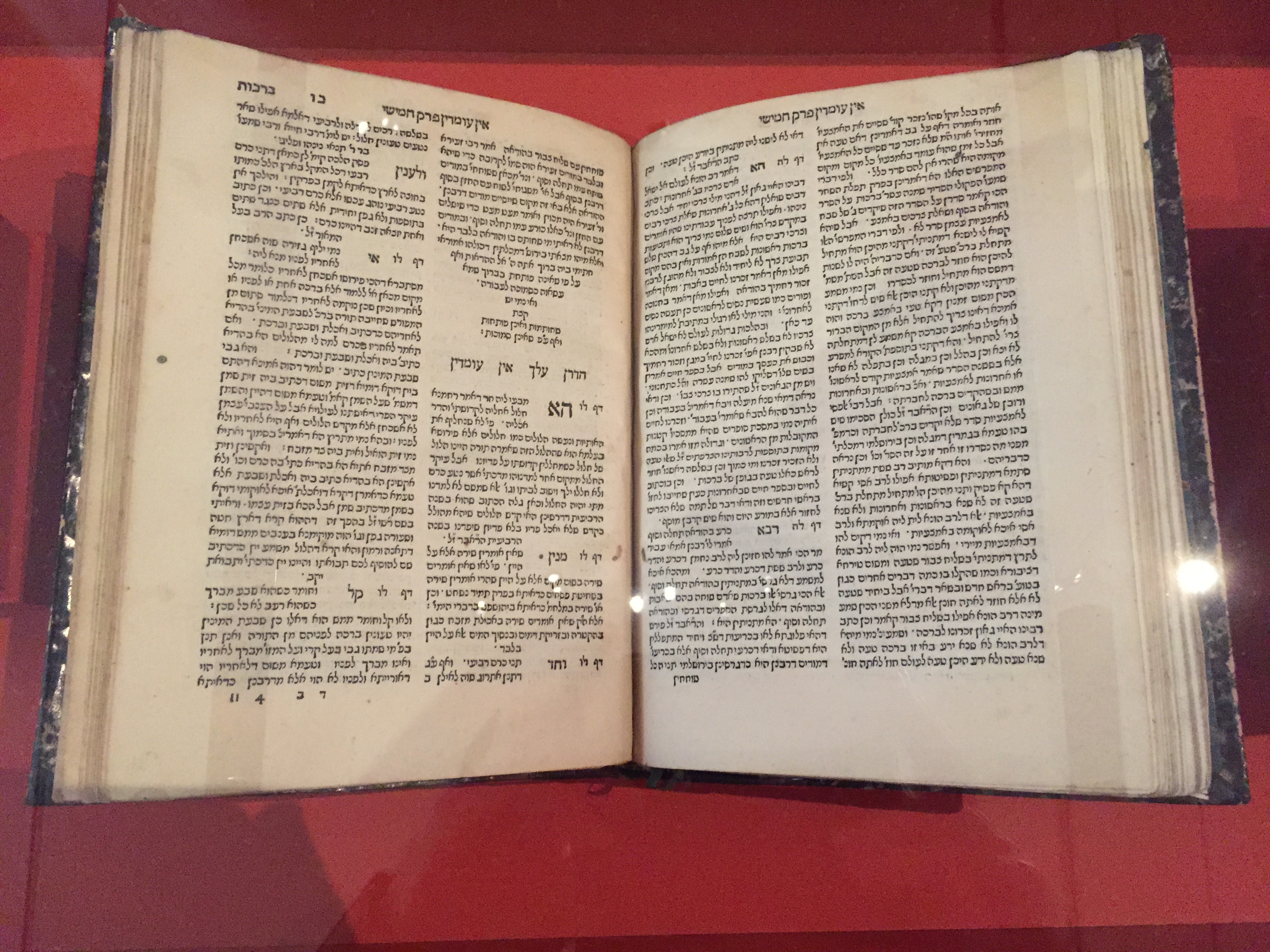

Personal life
- Born: 1235 Barcelona, Catalonia, Aragon
- Died: 1310 (aged 74–75) Barcelona, Catalonia, Aragon

Religious life
- Religion: Judaism

Shlomo ben Avraham ibn Aderet (Hebrew: שלמה בן אברהם אבן אדרת), also known as Solomon ben Abraham Aderet or Shelomoh ben Avraham, (1235–1310), was a medieval Spanish Jewish rabbi, halakhist, Talmudist, scholar, banker, and communal leader. He is widely known as the Rashba (Hebrew: רשב״א), an acronym of Rabbi Shlomo ben Avraham. Born in Barcelona in the Crown of Aragon, he became one of the leading rabbinical authorities and Jewish leaders of his time, to the extent that he was known as El Rab d'España ("The Rabbi of Spain"). He served as rabbi of the Main Synagogue of Barcelona for fifty years.

Aderet was regarded as the outstanding student of Naḥmanides, and his influence as a rabbinical authority spread throughout Europe. He composed a large number of responsa, which were collected for future guidance and constitute a major source for the history of the Jews in the late 13th century. Besides his responsa, he wrote novellae on various tractates of the Talmud, works that continued to be consulted.

Although a traditionalist, Aderet permitted his students to study physics and metaphysics after the age of 25 and placed no restriction on the study of astronomy and medicine, provided that such studies remained subordinate to inherited religious authority. He expressed this position in the formulation: "What is founded on tradition or God's inspiration cannot be dislodged by any science in the world". In theological and polemical controversies, Aderet defended Maimonides and opposed the messianic claimant Abraham Abulafia. He also refuted Raimundo Martini's attempt in Pugio Fidei to use the Talmud polemically against the Jews, and argued against Ibn Ḥazm concerning the claimed divine origin of the Qurʾān. He died in 1310.

== Biography ==
Aderet's teachers were Nahmanides and Yonah Gerondi. He was a master in the study of the Talmud and was not opposed to the Kabbala. Aderet was very active as a rabbi and as an author. Under his auspices and recommendation, part of Maimonides's commentary on the Mishnah was translated from Judeo-Arabic into Mishnaic Hebrew. Crowds of disciples attended his Talmudic lectures, many of whom came from distant places. Questions in significant numbers, dealing with ritual, the most varied topics of the Halakah, and religious philosophy, were addressed to him from Spain, Portugal, Italy, France, Germany, Moravia and even from Asia Minor.

Aderet's responsum to the Margraviate of Moravia in the year 1255 represents the earliest ever recorded evidence of a permanent Jewish presence in Austerlitz and in Třešť, as well as one of earliest recorded Jewish sources for that region.

His responsa show evidence of wide reading, keen intelligence, and systematic thought. They also afford a clear insight into the communal life of the time, portraying Aderet's contemporaries, and are of value for the study of rabbinical procedure and the intellectual development of the age in which he lived. Only half of these responsa have been published, and they total three thousand.

Among his numerous students were Yom Tov of Seville and Bahya ben Asher.

A manuscript purporting to be a certificate of indebtedness, dated 1262, in favour of "Solomon Adret of Barcelona" and a passport for the same Adret, dated 1269, are still extant.

=== Defense of Judaism ===
Aderet had to contend with the external enemies of Judaism and religious disputes and excesses within its ranks. He wrote a refutation of the charges of Raymond Martini, a Dominican friar of Barcelona, who, in his work, Pugio Fidei, had collected passages from the Talmud and the Midrash and interpreted them in a manner hostile to Judaism. These charges also induced Aderet to write a commentary on the haggadot, of which only a fragment is now extant. He also refuted the attacks of a Muslim who asserted that Christian priests had falsified the Bible. M. Schreiner has shown that this Muslim was ibn Hazm, and the book referred to was Al-Milal wal-Niḥal "Religions and Sects".

Aderet also opposed the increasing extravagances of the Kabbalists, who made significant headway in the Iberian Peninsula and were represented by Nissim ben Abraham of Avila, a pretended worker of miracles, and by Abraham Abulafia, the kabbalistic visionary. He combated these with vigour, but displayed no less animosity toward the philosophic-rationalistic conception of Judaism then prevailing, particularly in France, which was represented by Levi ben Abraham ben Hayyim, who treated most important religious questions with the utmost freedom and was joined by Isaac Albalag and others.

=== Aderet and Abba Mari ===
Opposed to these was another tendency, the chief object of which was the preservation of the pure faith of Judaism. At the head of this movement stood Abba Mari ben Moses ha-Yarḥi. He appealed to Aderet for assistance. An extensive correspondence ensued between the Hakhmei Provence (the sages of what is now southern France) and the northern Spanish authorities, Aderet taking an essential part. Afterward, this correspondence was collected and published by Abba Mari in a separate work, Minḥat Qenaot.

Aderet, whose disposition was peaceable, endeavoured to conciliate the opposing spirits at first. Ultimately, he was called upon to decide on the affair. On July 26, 1305, together with his colleagues of the rabbinate of Barcelona, he pronounced the ban of excommunication (ḥerem) over all who studied physics or metaphysics before the completion of their thirtieth year. A protest against this ban may be found in a poem in which Philosophy "calls out in a loud voice against . . . Solomon ben Adret and against all the rabbis of France . . . who have placed under the ban all people who approach her". Those who desired to study medicine as a profession were exempted from the ban. A particular ban was pronounced against the rationalistic Bible exegetes and the philosophic Haggadah commentators, their writings and their adherents. Enforcing these bans caused Aderet much trouble and embittered the closing years of his life. He left three sons, Isaac, Judah, and Astruc Solomon, all learned in the Talmud.

=== Maimonidean controversy ===
Aderet defended Maimonides during the contemporary debates over his works and authorized the translation of his commentary on the Mishnah from Judeo-Arabic to Hebrew.

Nevertheless, Aderet opposed the philosophic-rationalistic approach to Judaism often associated with Maimonides. He was part of the beth din in Barcelona that forbade men younger than 25 from studying secular philosophy or natural science. However, an exception was made for those who studied medicine. On July 26, 1305, the Rashba wrote:

"In that city [Barcelona] are those who write iniquity about the Torah and if there would be a heretic writing books, they should be burnt as if they were the book of sorcerers."

== Works ==
Of the works of Solomon ben Aderet there have appeared in print:

- A manual on kashrut (dietary laws) and other religious laws that are observed at home, Torat haBayit haArokh (The Long Law of the House), published at Venice in 1607, at Berlin in 1762, at Vienna in 1811, etc.
- The shorter manual, Torat haBayit haKatzar (The Short Law of the House), published at Cremona in 1565, and at Berlin in 1871. A number of his commentaries and novellae on Talmudic treatises have been printed.
- Mishmeret HaBayit, a defense against Aharon HaLevi's critique of Torat HaBayit.
- Sha'ar HaMayim, a work focusing on the laws of a mikveh (ritual bath).
- Piskei Ḥallah (Decisions on Ḥallah), published at Constantinople in 1518, and at Jerusalem in 1876.
- Avodat haKodesh (The Holy Service), on the laws of Sabbath and festivals, published at Venice in 1602.
- His polemical work against Islam was edited by Perles, as an appendix to the latter's monograph on Aderet.

=== Talmud commentaries ===
His commentaries upon seven Talmudic treatises published at Constantinople in 1720, and at Berlin in 1756. Similar disquisitions upon five treatises were published at Venice in 1523 and at Amsterdam in 1715. He wrote besides a number of disquisitions upon single treatises. His Talmud commentaries are now known as Hiddushei HaRashba.

Not all commentaries traditionally attributed to Rashba were actually composed by him. Elchonon Wasserman stated that the commentary on Sukkah attributed to Rashba was actually written by Yom Tov Asevilli, the commentary on Ketubot was actually written by Nachmanides, and the commentary on Menachot was written by an unknown author other than Rashba. Yisrael Meir Kagan suggested that the commentary on Menachot was by Isaiah di Trani, while Israel Joshua Trunk argued that the author was Solomon ben Abraham of Montpellier.

=== Responsa ===
Aderet was considered an outstanding rabbinic authority, and more than 3,000 of his responsa are known to be extant. Questions were addressed to him from Spain, Portugal, Italy, France, Germany, and even from Asia Minor. His responsa, which cover the entire gamut of Jewish life, are concise and widely quoted by halakhic authorities.

Aderet's responsa also illustrate his opposition to messianism and prophetic pretensions as a general phenomenon, with examples against Nissim ben Abraham and Abraham Abulafia.

His responsa were printed in Bologna (1539), Venice (1545), Hanau (1610), and other places. The second part of his responsa appeared under the title "Toledot Adam" (The Generations of Man) at Leghorn in 1657, the third part at the same place in 1778, the fourth part at Salonica in 1803, and the fifth part at Leghorn in 1825.

According to Elchonon Wasserman, some responsa attributed to Rashba were actually written by other authors, notably Meir of Rothenburg.

=== Academic genealogy ===
Nachmanides
Bahya ben Asher

Yonah Gerondi
Rashba
Yom Tov Asevilli

Teachers
Students

== See also ==
- History of the Jews in Spain
