= Saban (name) =

Saban is an English, Arabic, French, Turkish, Spanish and Jewish given name and surname. Notable people with the name include:

== Given name ==
- Saban of Baekje (third century), seventh king of Baekje, one of the Three Kingdoms of Korea
- Šaban Bajramović (1936–2008), Romani musician from Serbia
- Şaban Erden (born 1949), Turkish municipal administrator
- Şaban Özdoğan (born 1990), Turkish-Danish football player
- Šaban Poluža (1871–1945), Albanian military leader in Kosovo
- Šaban Šaulić (1951–2019), Serbian folk singer
- Šaban Sejdi (born 1959), Macedonian wrestler
- Šaban Trstena (born 1965), Macedonian wrestler

== Surname ==
- Andrej Saban (born 1962), Slovak jazz fusion guitarist
- Avi Saban (born 1989), Israeli football player
- Cheryl Saban, American philanthropist
- Haim Saban (born 1944), Israeli-American television and media proprietor
- Klemi Saban (born 1980), Israeli football player
- Lou Saban (1921–2009), American football player and coach
- Luan Shabani, Greek weightlifter
- Mario Javier Saban (born 1966), Argentine Sephardi theologian
- Martin Šaban (born 1987), Croatian footballer
- Maya Saban (born 1978), German singer
- Nick Saban (born 1951), American football coach
- Phia Saban (born 1998), English actress
- Sinem Saban, Turkish-Australian film maker
- Tamir Saban (born 1999), American-Israeli basketball player
- Yitzhak Saban (born 1952), Israeli politician
- Ertan Saban (born 1977), Turkish actor and screenwriter
- Nedim Saban (born 1967), Turkish-Jewish actor/adapter/director

== See also ==
- Saban (disambiguation)
