= Masaki Tunnel =

Railway tunnel in Honshu, Japan

Masaki Railway Tunnel
- Masaki tunnel on Sanriku Railway line
- Interactive map of Masaki Railway Tunnel

Overview
- Line: Sanriku Railway
- Location: between Shin-Tarō Station and Settai Station
- Coordinates: 39°45′0.6582″N 141°58′7.572″E
- Status: active

Operation
- Opened: 1984
- Operator: Japanese National Railways
- Traffic: Railway
- Character: Passenger and Freight

Technical
- Line length: 6,532 m (21,430 ft)
- No. of tracks: 2

Masaki Tunnel (真崎トンネル, Masaki tonneru) is a tunnel on Sanriku Railway (Rias line) that runs from Shin-Tarō Station to Settai Station, in Miyako city, Iwate prefecture with total length of 6.532 km. It was built and completed in 1984.

== See also ==
- List of tunnels in Japan
- Seikan Tunnel undersea tunnel between Honshu-Hokkaido islands
- Kanmon Railway Tunnel undersea tunnel between Honshu-Kyushu islands
- Sakhalin–Hokkaido Tunnel
- Bohai Strait tunnel
