= Shaban (disambiguation) =

Sha'ban, Shaban, Sha'baan, Shabaan, Sha'aban, Shaaban, Shaabaan, Saban, Sheban or Shabon is a month of the Islamic calendar.

Shaban and variants may also refer to:

- Shaban (name)

== Geography ==
- Shaban, East Azerbaijan, a village in Iran
- Shaban, Hamadan, a village in Iran
- Shaban, Lorestan, a village in Iran
- Shaban, Zanjan, a village in Iran
- Shaban Rural District (Meshgin Shahr County), an administrative division of Ardabil province, Iran
- Shaban Rural District (Nahavand County), an administrative division of Hamadan province, Iran

== See also ==
- Saban (disambiguation)
