= Sabane =

Sabane may refer to:

- Sabanê language, Brazil
- Sabane Station, Iwate, Japan

== See also ==
- Saban (disambiguation)
