= Erden (disambiguation) =

Erden is a municipality in Rhineland-Palatinate, Germany.

Erden may also refer to:

== Places ==
- Erden, Bulgaria, a village in Montana Province

== People ==
- Cüneyt Erden (born 1977), Turkish basketball player
- Şaban Erden (born 1949), Deputy Secretary General of the Istanbul Metropolitan Municipality
- Semih Erden (born 1986), Turkish basketball player
- Erden Alkan (born 1941), Turkish actor living in Germany
- Erden Eruç (born 1961), Turkish-American adventurer
