= Shaban (name) =

Shahaban, Shaʻban or Shaaban is an Arabic given name and surname (شعبان). It is also the name of the eighth month (shaʻban) of the Islamic Calendar, a word indicating "separation" or "dispersion," because the pagan Arabs used to disperse in search of water during this month. Similar names exist in other traditions.

== People named Shaban, Sha'ban or Shaaban ==
People named Shaban, or a variant of that name, include:

Last name

- Abed Al Ghani Mosbah Shaaban (born 1927–1977), Lebanese maestro, music searcher and creator
- Ahmed Shaaban (born 1978), Egyptian footballer
- Al-Ashraf Sha'ban, 14th century sultan
- Basil Shaaban (born 1980), Lebanese racing driver
- Bouthaina Shaaban (born 1953), Syrian politician
- Hesham Shaban (born 1980), Libyan footballer
- Mohamed Shaaban (born 1984), Egyptian footballer
- Mostafa Shaban (born 1970), Egyptian actor
- Nagwa Shaaban (1959–2019), Egyptian author
- Omar Chaaban Bugiel (born 1994), Lebanese footballer
- Rami Shaaban (born 1975), Swedish footballer
- Yousuf Shaaban (1931–2021), Egyptian actor

First name

- Shaaban Abdel Rahim (1957–2019), Egyptian singer
- Shaban al-Dalou (2004/2005–2024), Palestinian software engineer student, killed in Al-Aqsa Hospital massacre
- Shaaban Mahmoud (born 1981), Egyptian footballer
- Shaban Bantariza (born 1963), Uganda military
- Shaban Gashi (1939–1990), Yugoslav cinematographer
- Shaban Ismaili (born 1989), Macedonian footballer
- Shaban Jafari (1921–2006), Iranian political figure
- Shaban Nditi (born 1983), Tanzanian footballer
- Shaban Polluzha (1871–1945), Albanian military leader
- Shaban Shefket, Bulgarian footballer
- Šaban Bajramović, (1936–2008) Serbian singer

== See also ==
- Sha'ban (disambiguation)
- Saban (disambiguation)
