= Sebane =

Sabane may be,

- Sabane language, Brazil
- Sabane Station, Iwate, Japan
