= Nikola Aslanov =

- Born: 1875; Kırk Kilise, Ottoman Empire (today Kırklareli, Turkey)
- Died: September 24, 1905 (aged 29–30); Payas, Ottoman Empire (today Turkey)
- Organization: IMARO

Nikola Hristov Aslanov (Bulgarian: Никола Христов Асланов) was a Bulgarian revolutionary, a worker of the Internal Macedonian-Adrianople Revolutionary Organization (IMARO).

Nikola Aslanov was born in 1875 in Kırk Kilise, (Lozengrad) East Thrace, today located in Turkey and known as Kirklareli. He worked as a merchant. In 1896, he became a member of the IMARO. In 1900 he was chosen as a member of the regional revolutionary committee in Lozengrad. In the same year, he was arrested by the Ottomans and imprisoned by the so-called Keremidchioglu Affair. Later Aslanov was tortured. He was sentenced to ten years in prison and was exiled to the Payas Kale fortress in Anatolia, where he died in 1905.
