= Şaban (name) =

Şaban is a masculine given name of Arabic origin which is used in Turkey. It was derived from the Islamic calendar month Sha'aban. Another meaning of the name is interval.

Notable people with the name include:

== Given name ==
- Şaban Dişli (born 1958), Turkish politician and diplomat
- Şaban Erden (born 1949), Turkish politician
- Şaban Karataş (1928–2016), Turkish academic and politician
- Şaban Kartal (1952–1998), Yugoslav-born Turkish football player
- Şaban Özdemir (born 1981), Turkish journalist
- Şaban Özdoğan (born 1990), Danish football player of Turkish origin

== Fictional characters ==
- Şaban, Turkish film character played by Kemal Sunal
