= Joseph ben Judah of Ceuta =

Medieval Jewish physician and poet

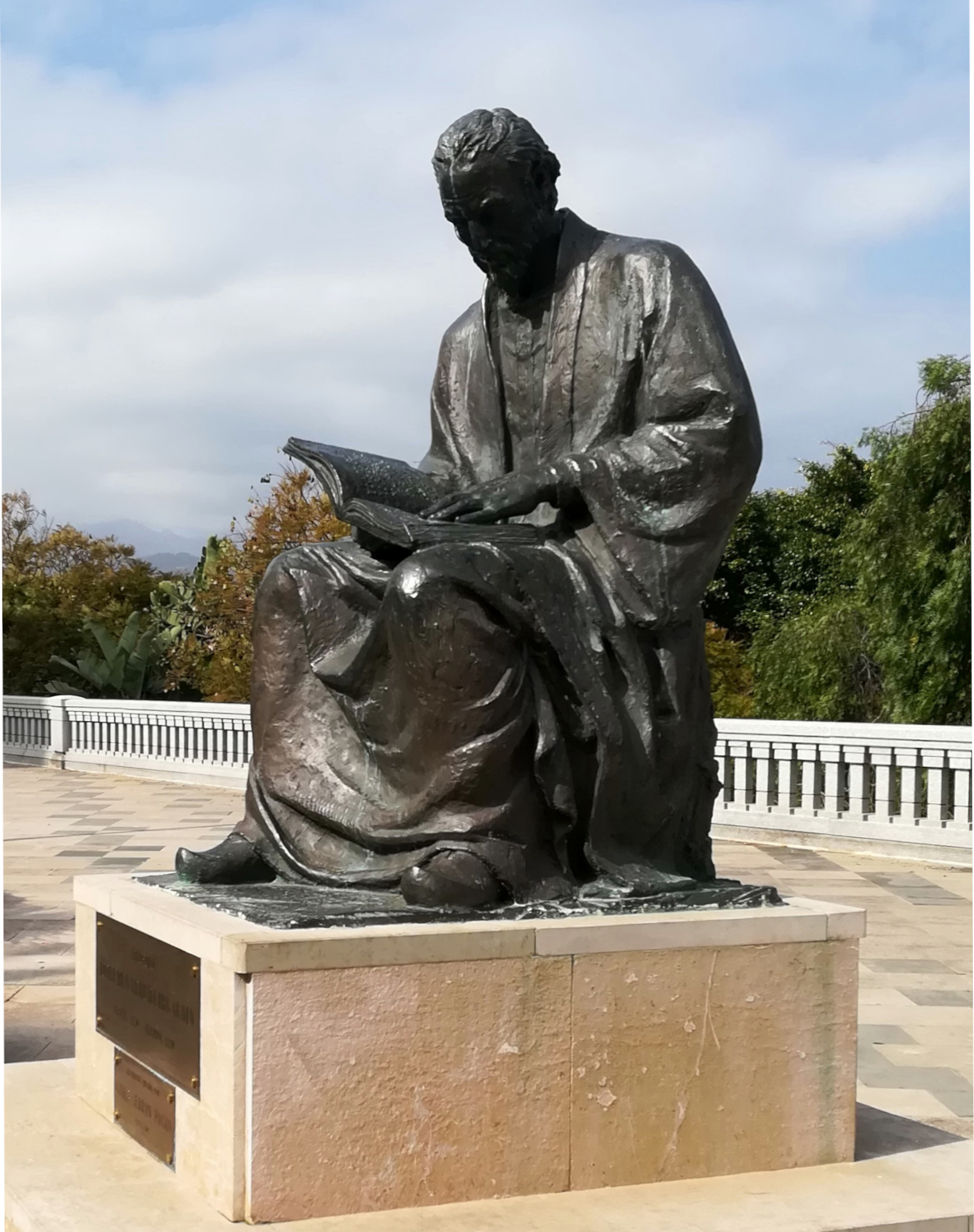
Joseph ben Judah of Ceuta

Joseph ben Judah ben Shimeon (Hebrew: יוסף בן יהודה Yosef ben Yehuda; Arabic: يوسف بن شِمعون Yusuf Ben Shimeon) of Ceuta (c. 1160–1226) was a Jewish physician and poet, and disciple of Maimonides. Maimonides wrote his work, The Guide for the Perplexed, for Joseph.

According to Al-Qifti, he authored the maqama The Tale of Toviyah ben Tsidkiyah (נאום טוביה בן צדקיה) in Alexandria and sent it to Fustat to make the acquaintance of Maimonides. According to Matti Huss, the maqama is derived from Hadith Bayad wa Riyad.

== Life ==
For the first 25 years of his life ben Judah lived with his father, who was an artisan at Ceuta then part of the Almohad Caliphate.

He left the Maghreb when he was about twenty-five years old, and was already engaged in the practice of medicine. When not occupied with professional work he wrote Hebrew poems, which were known to Yehuda Alharizi, who speaks highly of them in his "Taḥkemoni". Maimonides, to whom Joseph sent his poems together with other compositions from Alexandria, was not so lavish with his praise. He appreciated only the great longing for higher studies which found expression in Joseph's poems.

Joseph went from Alexandria to Fustat (now in Cairo) and studied logic, mathematics, and astronomy under Maimonides. Maimonides likewise expounded the writings of the Prophets, because Joseph seemed perplexed as to the possibility of reconciling the teachings of the Prophets with the results of metaphysical research. Maimonides advised patience and systematic study; but the disciple left before Maimonides had completed his course of lectures on the Prophets. His stay with Maimonides was short: less than two years.

Joseph went further east and settled in Aleppo. Here he established himself as a medical practitioner, married, and made a successful commercial journey which enabled him to live henceforth independently and free from care. It was probably in the course of this journey that he witnessed at Baghdad the burning of the works of the philosopher Izz al-Din ibn 'Abd al-Salam (1192).

After Joseph's departure from Fusṭaṭ, the intercourse between master and student was continued in writing. Maimonides's The Guide for the Perplexed was written for Joseph and for those like him who found it difficult to harmonize the results of philosophical research with the teachings of the Prophets. Joseph, however, was not convinced; for he writes allegorically to his master as follows:

Thy daughter Kimah [i.e., Maimonides' method of reconciling theology and philosophy: the most difficult point in his theory seems to have been the explanation of prophecy], whom I loved and married according to law and custom, in the presence of two witnesses, 'Abd Allah and Ibn Rushd, turned her face from me to follow other men. There must be something wrong in her education. Restore the wife to her husband, for he is a prophet.

Maimonides replies in the same style, declaring the innocence of his daughter and the guilt of the husband; and he advises his disciple to have faith in God, and to be more modest and more careful in his utterances lest he bring evil upon himself.

Joseph remained, however, a true disciple of his master. He abandoned his other pursuits and wished to open a school. Maimonides dissuaded him from the undertaking, unless he should do it without seeking material profit from his teaching. When, thirty years later, al-Ḥarizi visited Aleppo (1217) he found Joseph in the zenith of his glory. He praised him as the "Western light", and applied to him the words of Scripture, "and Joseph was ruler over the whole land; he supplied food for all". He must indeed have had great authority when he defended his master and silenced the opposition expressed by some rabbis in Baghdad against the works of Maimonides. Maimonides exhorted Joseph to moderation, begging him, being young in years, not to oppose an old rabbi whose authority was recognized in the congregation.

Joseph was twice married: by the first wife he had two daughters; by the second, several sons.

== Works ==
Joseph's poems are all lost except one in praise of Maimonides, and the beginning of another preserved by al-Ḥarizi.

His only other surviving work is a dissertation in Arabic on the problem of Creation. This appears (but is not certain) to have been written before his contact with Maimonides—the opinions attributed to philosophy are those of Avicenna.

It is entitled Ma'amar bimehuyav ha-metsiut ve'eykhut sidur ha-devarim mimenu vehidush ha'olam (A Treatise as to (1) Necessary Existence (2) The Procedure of Things from the Necessary Existence and (3) The Creation of the World).

In it, as summarised by Colette Sirat, "the necessity of God's existence is first demonstrated by Avicenna's proof of contingency, but this demonstration is, as the author says, that of the philosophers, and seems to him less convincing than that proposed by the theologians—the mutakallimūn, who affirm not only the existence of a necessary being, but the temporal creation of the world, which cannot be deduced by philosophical demonstration. In effect, only divine choice and will can explain the multiplicity evident in the world, for out of an absolutely One and Only God only unity can necessarily proceed; the multiplicity that exists in fact is therefore an act of will and not the consequence of a necessary cause".

== Bibliography ==
- Moritz Steinschneider, in Ersch and Gruber, Encyc. section ii., part 31, pp. 45 et seq.;
- Adolf Neubauer, in Monatsschrift, 1870, pp. 348 et seq.;
- Michael Friedländer, Guide of the Perplexed of Maimonides, part i., note 1.
