= Saban =

Saban or Šaban may refer to:

== People ==
- Saban (name), for people with the name
- Sabans, a small indigenous ethnic group of Sarawak, Malaysia

== Other uses ==
- Saban Capital Group, a private investment firm investing in music and entertainment
- Saban Center for Middle East Policy, part of the Brookings Institution
- Saban Entertainment, the former name of BVS Entertainment, a defunct television production company
- Saban grizzled langur, a species of monkey
- Saban Theatre, Beverly Hills, California
- Şaban, list of people with a similar name
- Saban Bowl, an annual football game that is part of the Alabama–LSU football rivalry

== See also ==
- Sabah (disambiguation)
- Sabean (disambiguation)
- Sabian (disambiguation)
- Sha'ban (disambiguation)
- Shaban (name)
