= Kırklareli =

- Municipality
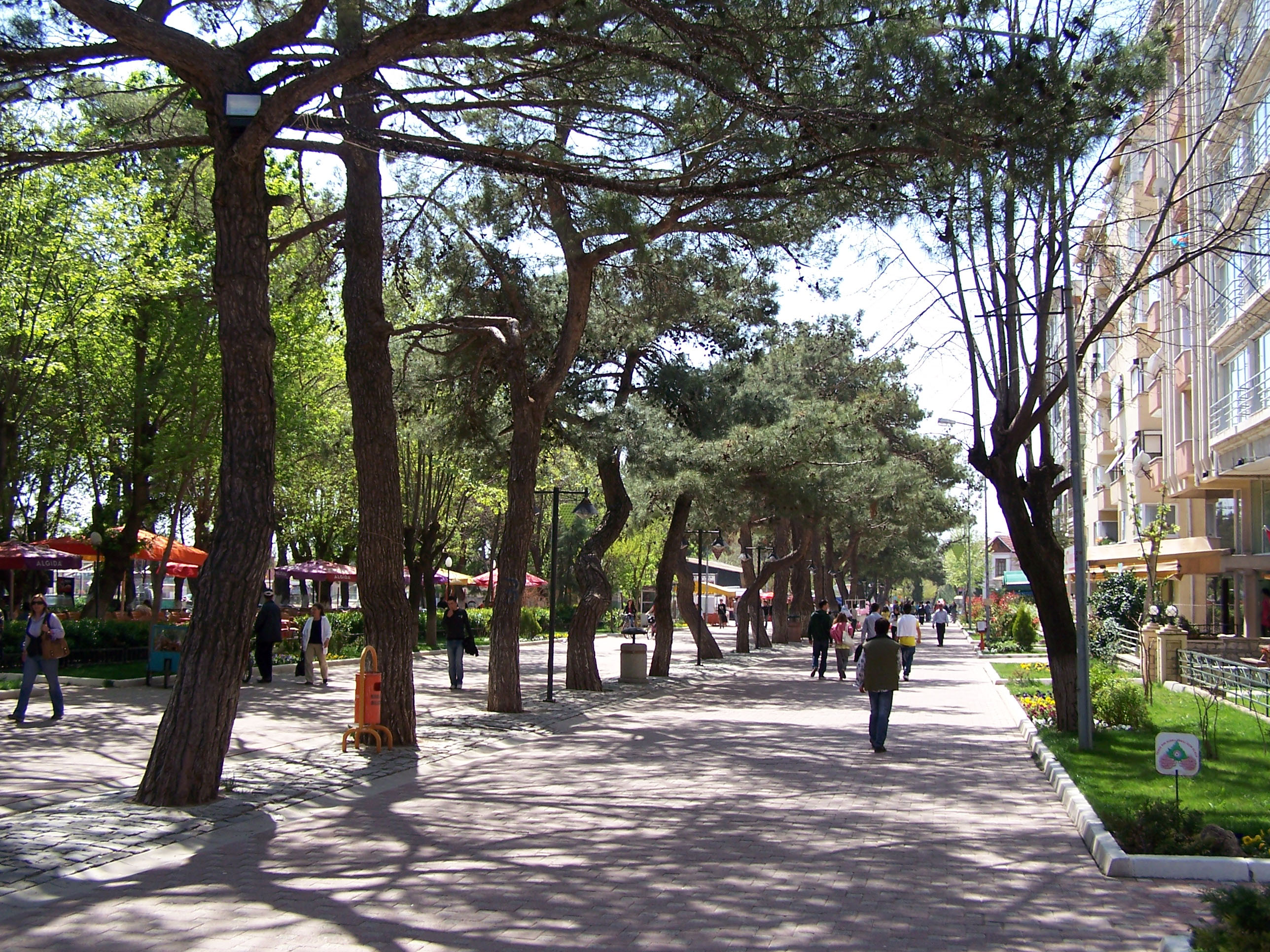
- İstasyon Street in Kırklareli

- Logo

- Location within Turkey Location within Marmara
- Coordinates: 41°44′05″N 27°13′31″E
- Country: Turkey
- Province: Kırklareli
- District: Kırklareli

Government
  - Mayor: Derya Bulut (MHP)
- Elevation: 168 m (551 ft)
- Population (2022): 85,493
- Time zone: UTC+3 (TRT)
- Postal code: 39000
- Area code: 0288
- Website: www.kirklareli.bel.tr

Kırklareli (Turkish pronunciation: [kɯɾkˈɫaɾeli]) is a city in the European part of Turkey. It is the seat of Kırklareli Province and Kırklareli District. Its population is 85,493 (2022).

== Name ==
It is not known when the city was founded, nor under what name. The Byzantine Greeks called it Saranta Ekklisies (Greek: Σαράντα Εκκλησιές, meaning "forty churches"). In modern Greek it is known by the same name. In the 14th century this was translated to Turkish and called Kırk Kilise (40 churches). Following the establishment of the Turkish Republic in 1923, sanjaks became cities and on December 20, 1924, Kırk Kilise's name was changed to Kırklareli, meaning The Place of the Forties. The denomination Kırklareli was already used years before 1924, for example in the contemporary literature concerning the Balkan Wars of 1912–13. The Bulgarian name of the town is Lòzengrad (Лозенград) which means Vineyard Town. (see also its other names)

== History ==
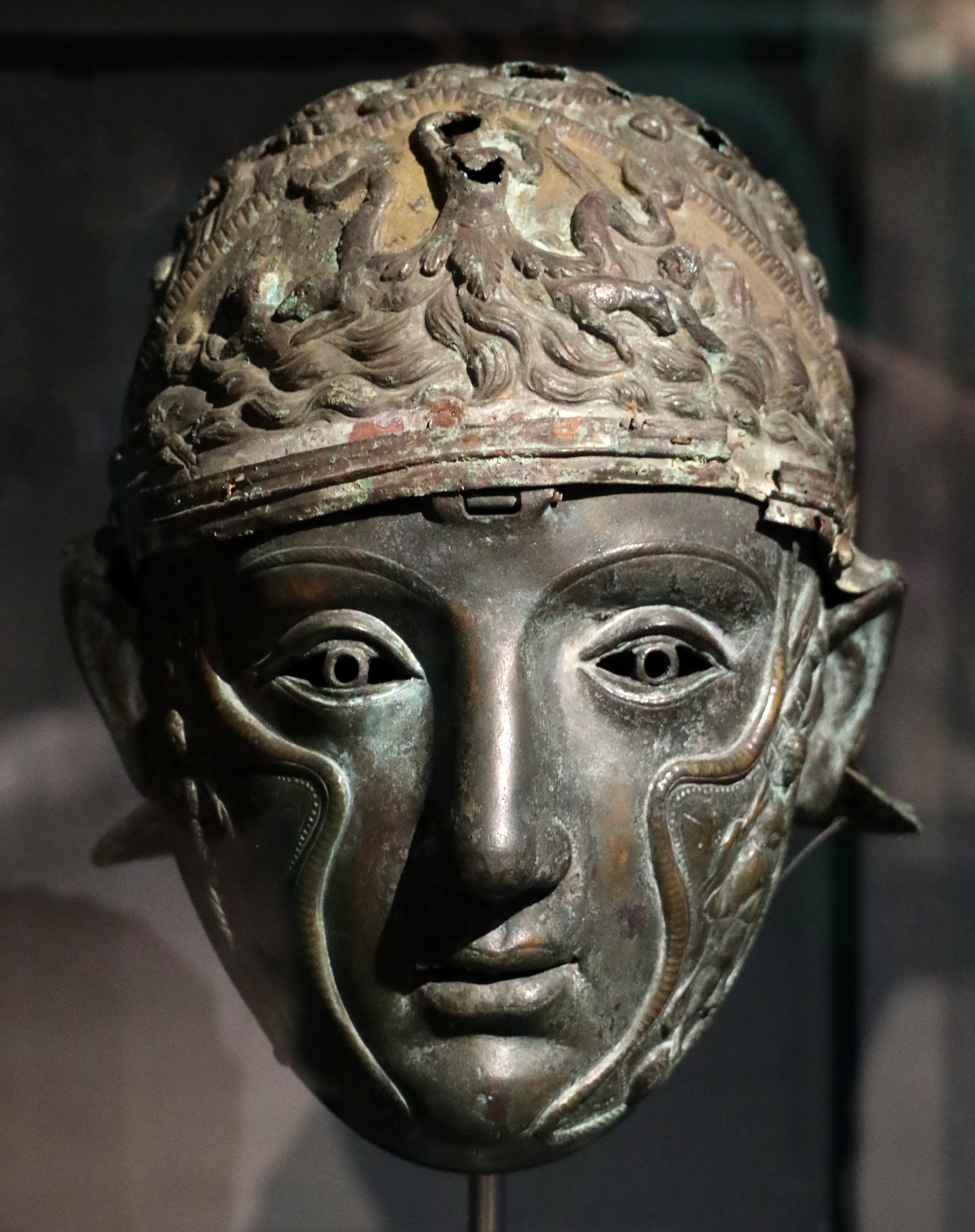
Roman period, bronze ritual helmet from the Vize-Kirklareli mound, 1st century AD (Archaeological Museum Istanbul).

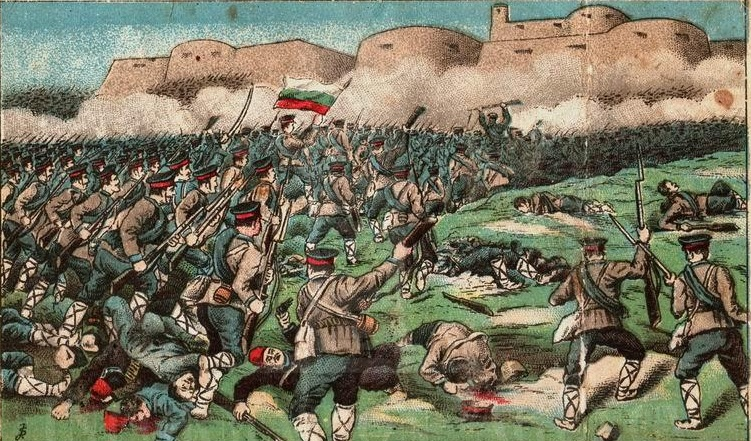
Siege of Lozengrad/Kırk Kilise (now Kırklareli), in the Balkan Wars.

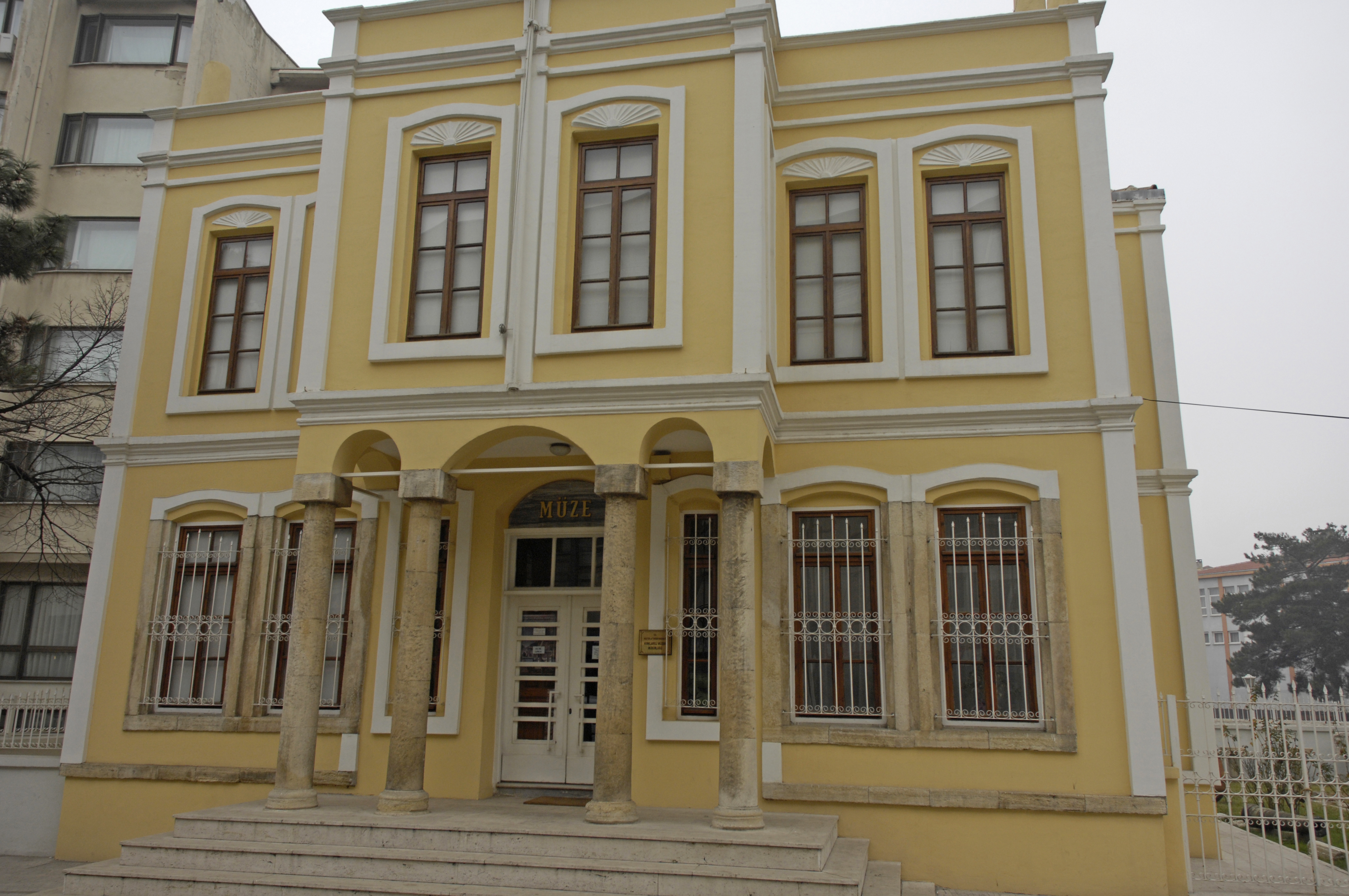
Kırklareli Museum

Ongoing archeological excavations in the city support the claim that the area was the location of one of the first organized settlements on the European continent, with artifacts from the Paleolithic and Neolithic periods.

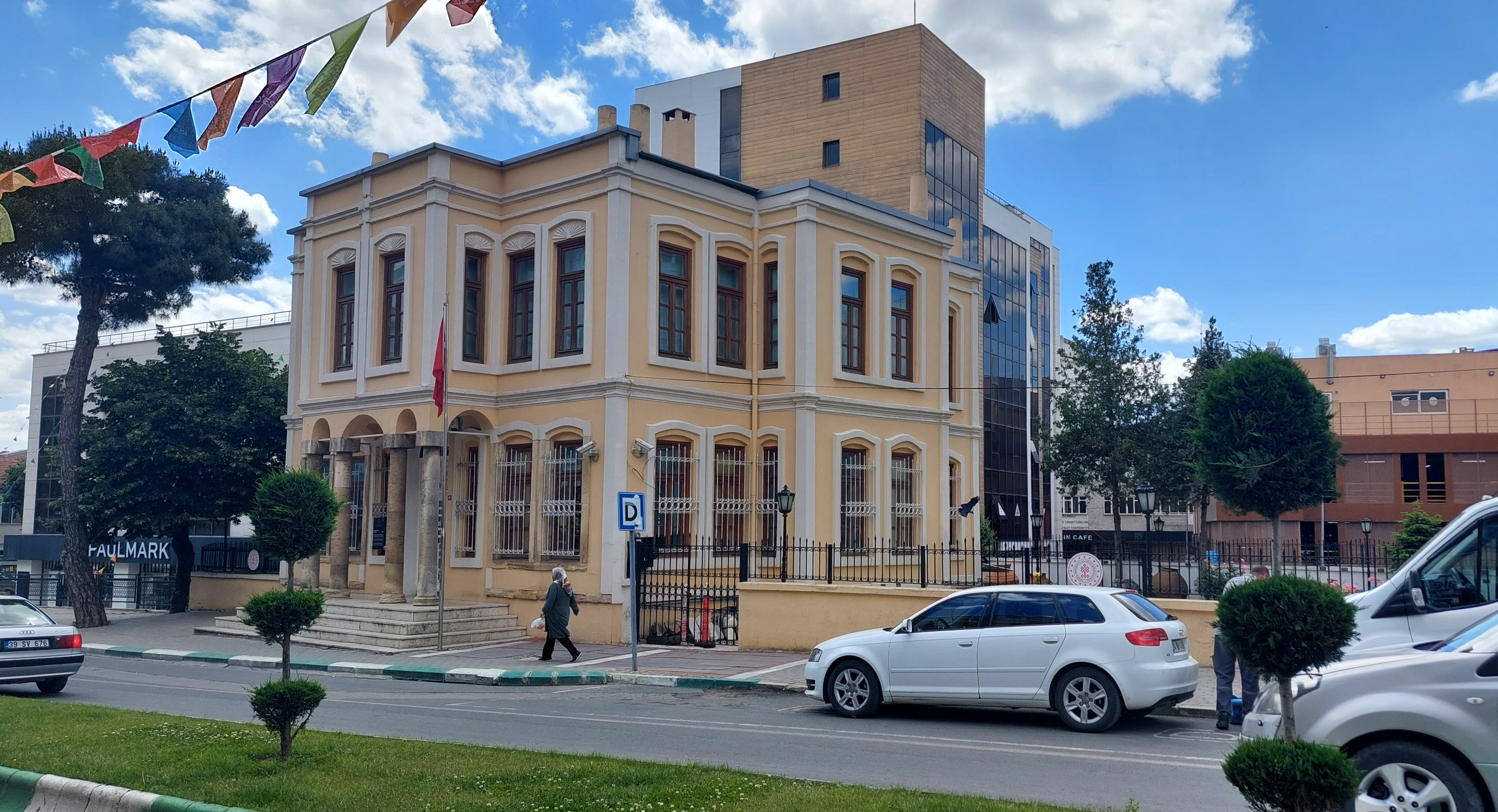
Kırklareli Old Municipality Building.jpg

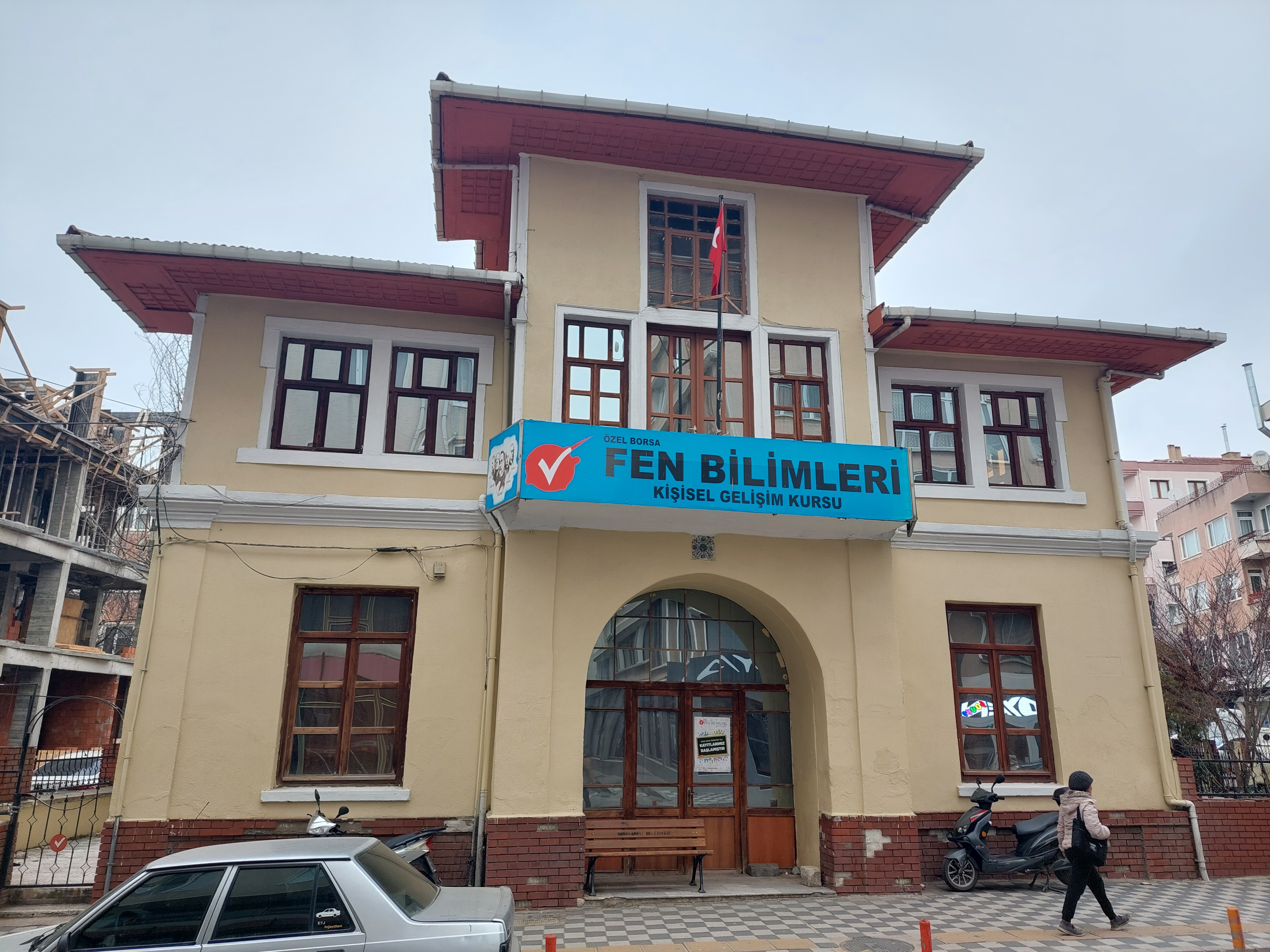
Old Stock Exchange Building, Kırklareli.

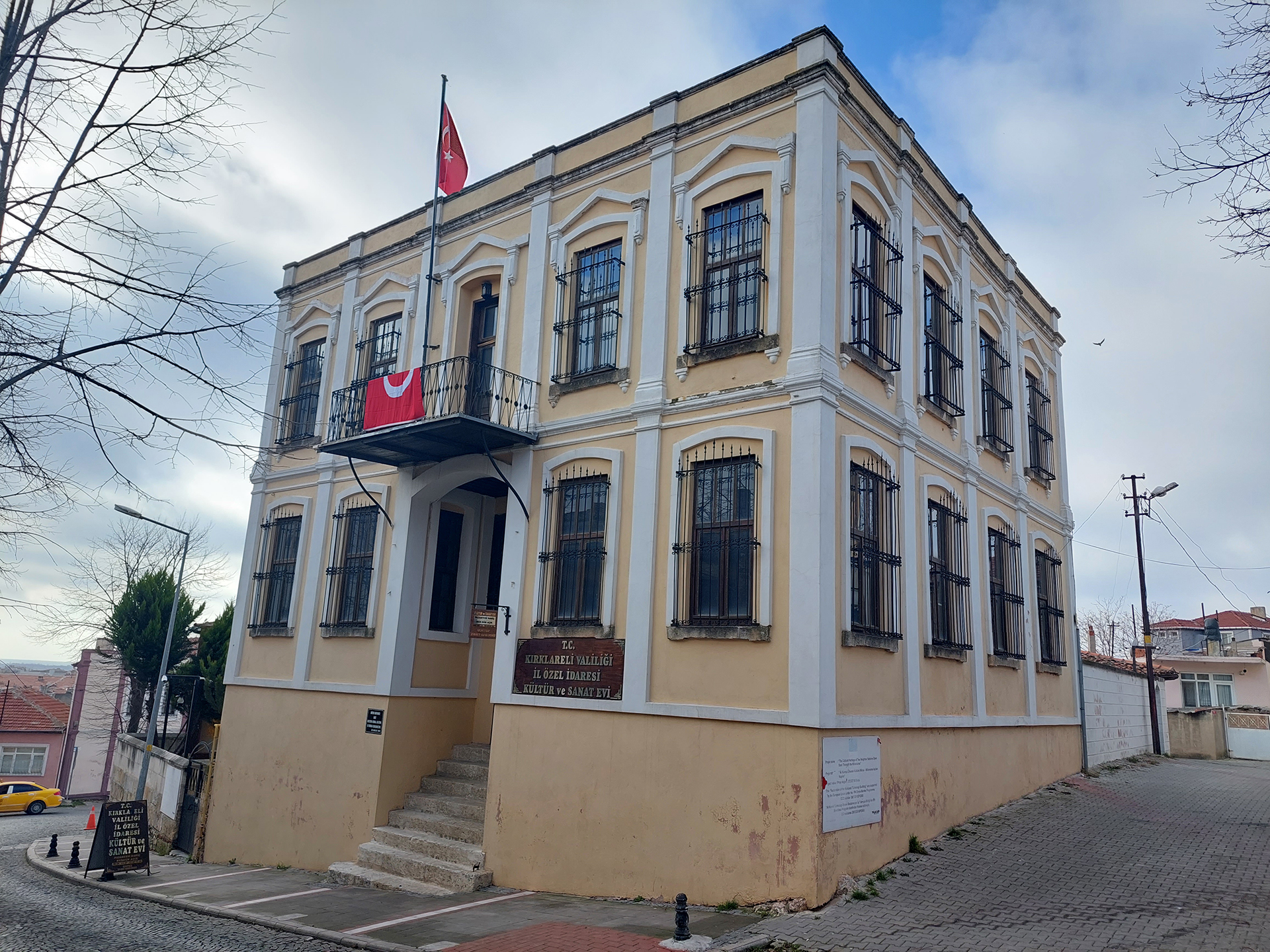
Old Turkish Hearth Building, Kırklareli.

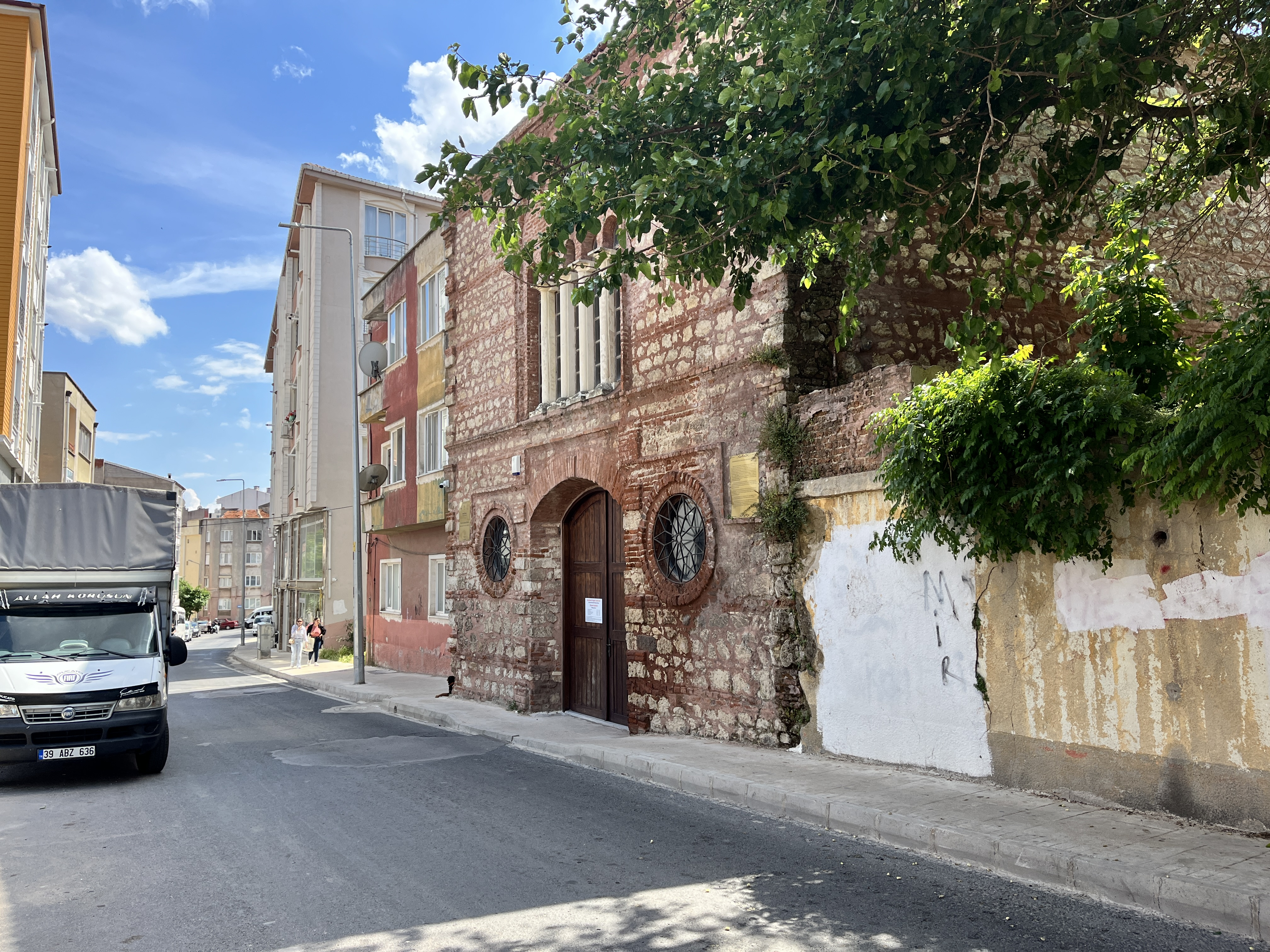
Kırklareli Health History House

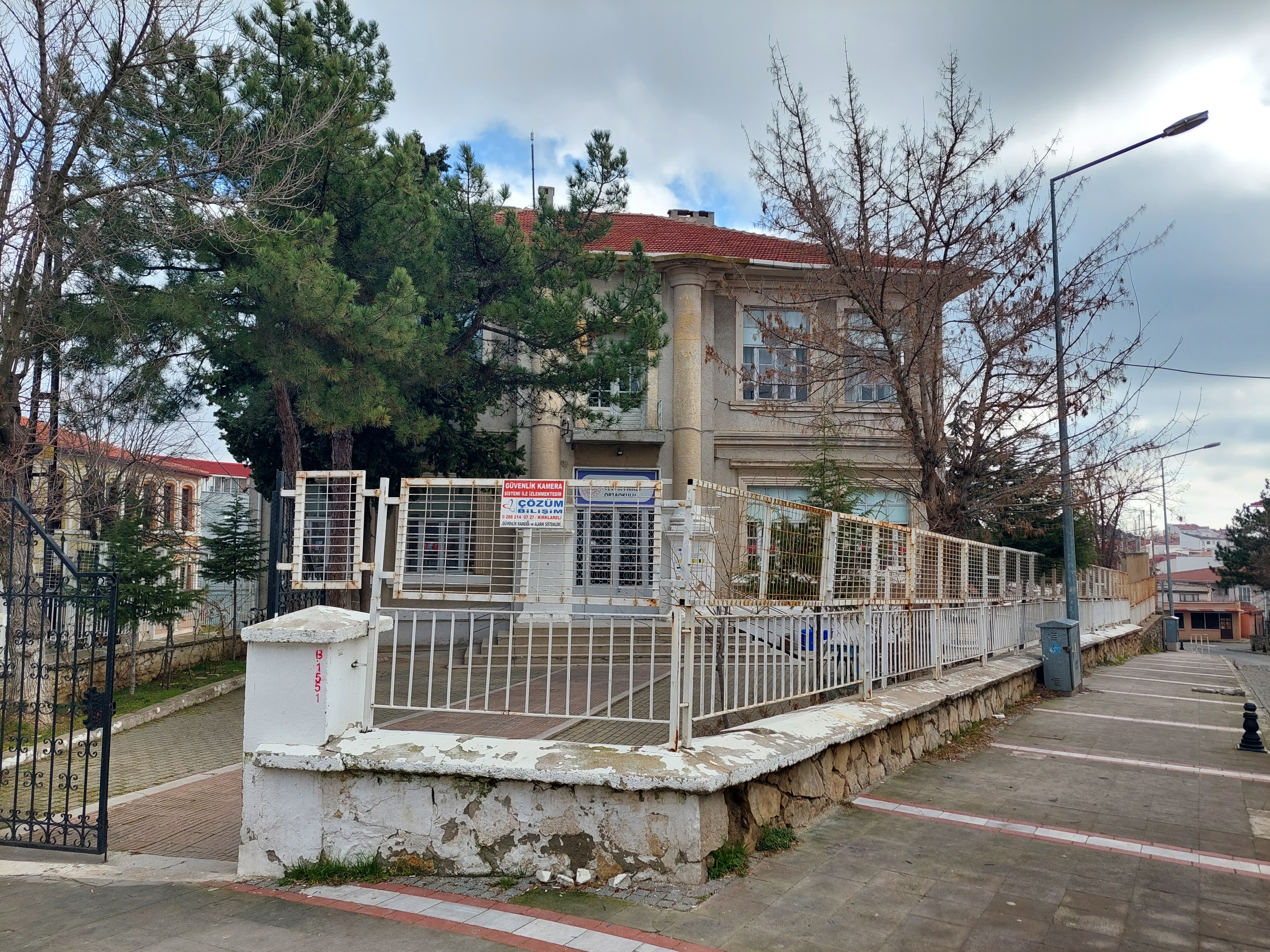
Kırklareli Greek Girls' School

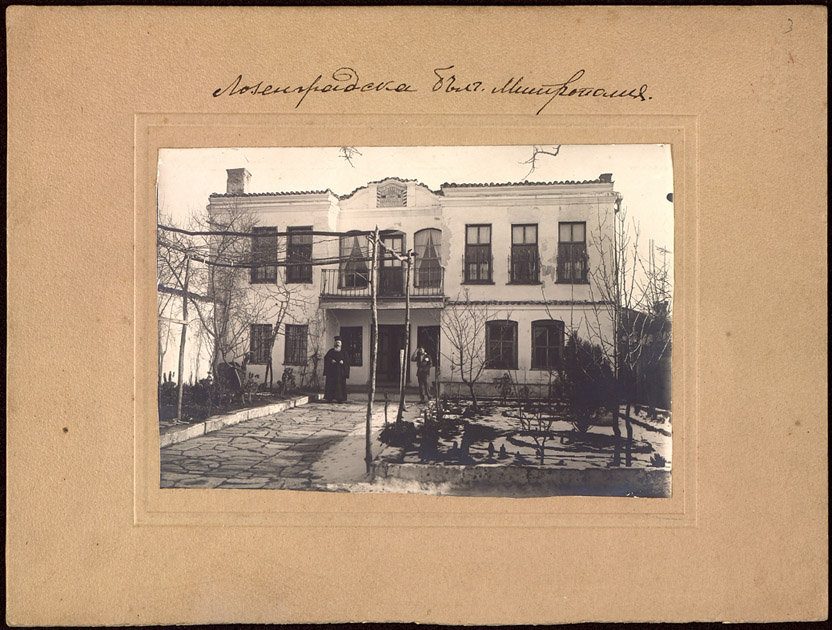
Lozengrad Bulgarian Metropoly postcard.

The settlement and its surrounding areas were conquered by the Persians in 513–512 BC, during the reign of King Darius I.

In 914 during the Bulgarian invasion in Adrianople led by Simeon I, the settlement was captured by the Bulgarians and was under Bulgarian rule until 1003 when it was lost to the Byzantines.

The Ottoman Turks took the city and its region from the Byzantines in 1363, during the reign of Sultan Murad I.

The city was damaged during the Greek War of Independence (1821–1829).

According to the 1878 record "Ethnography of the Wilayahs Adrianopol, Monastir and Thessaloniki" Kırk Kilise was inhabited by 6,700 Bulgarians, 2,850 Greeks, and 2,700 belonging to other ethnic groups (Turks, Gajals, Dağlılar, Pomaks, Circassians).

In 1906, the Diocese of Saranda Ekklisies was detached from the Metropolis of Adrianople and was elevated to the status of Metropolis.

According to the official Ottoman census of 1881-1882, the Sanjak of Kirk Klise had a total population of 125,329 people, including 36,227 Muslims (28.9%), 53,663 Greek Orthodox Christians (42.8%), 33,999 Bulgarian Orthodox Christians (27.1%) and 1,440 others, mostly Jews. By the 1906-1907 Ottoman census, the total population had grown to 181,204, of which 78,338 were Muslims (43.2%), 70,501 Greek Orthodox Christians (38.9%), 29,736 Bulgarian Orthodox Christians (16.4%) and 2,629 others following the settlement of Muslims from the Ottoman Empire's former holdings on the Balkans and the mass exodus of Bulgarians in the wake of the Ilinden-Preobrazhenie Uprising.

During the Balkan Wars (1912–1913) Kırk Kilise was occupied by Bulgaria, and then by Greece in the aftermath of World War I (1914–1918) prompting the exodus of its Bulgarian population (there were a large number of journalists who reported on the actions at Kırk Kilise). Following the Turkish War of Independence (1919–1923) the city was retaken by the Turks on November 10, 1922. According to the 1923 population exchange agreement between Greece and Turkey, the Greeks of the city were exchanged for the Muslims (Turks, Pomaks, Karadjaovalides and Albanians) living in Greece.

Most of the inhabitants of the city are Turks who formerly lived in Thessaloniki until the First Balkan War of 1912. The Treaty of Lausanne (1923) which defines Turkey's western border in Thrace also resulted in a Kırklareli Province within Turkey.

=== The Megleno-Romanians of Kırklareli ===
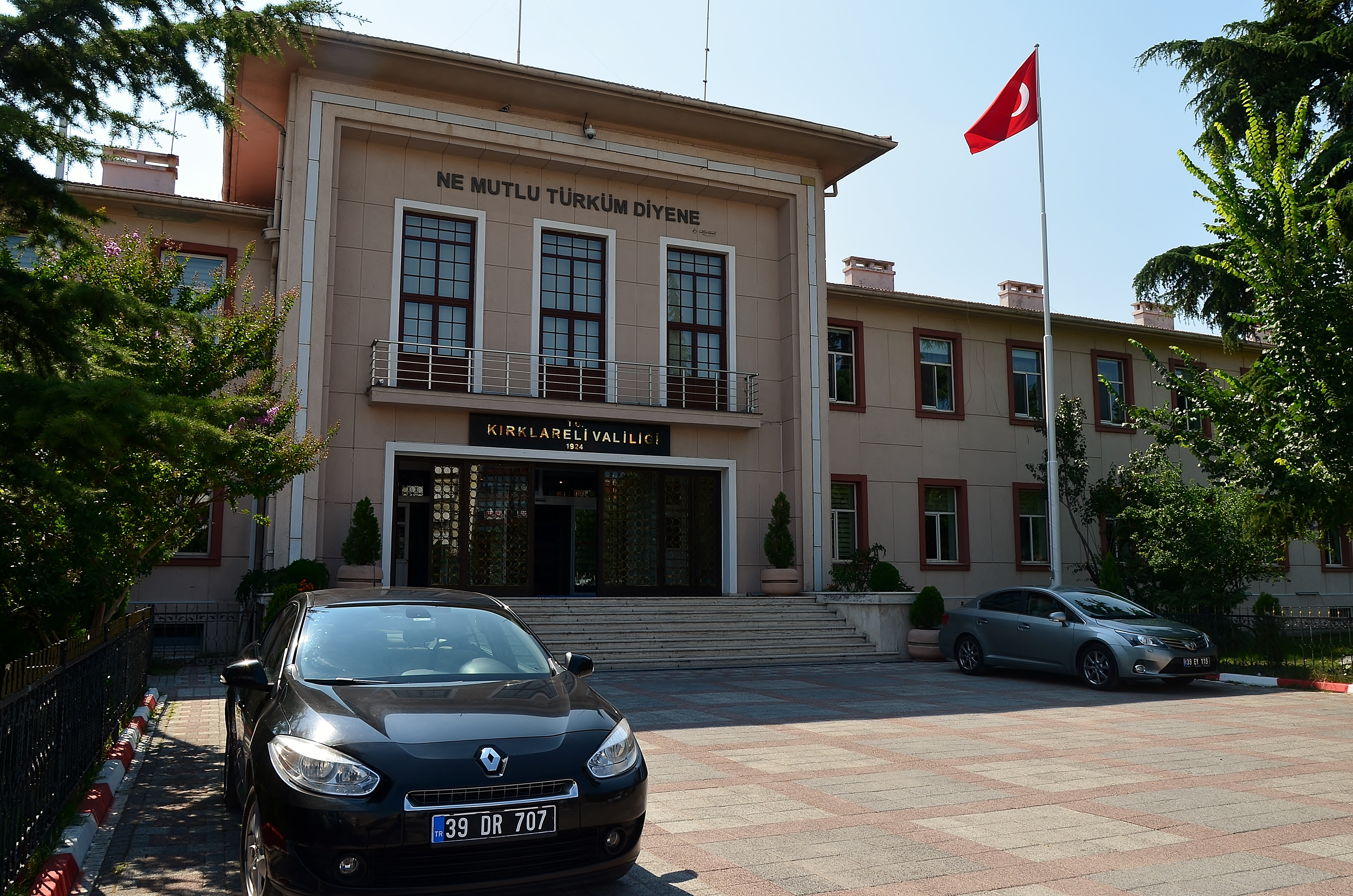
Governor's Office in Kırklareli, Turkey

In 1923, most of the 3,700 inhabitants of Notia, the only Muslim village of the Megleno-Romanians in northern Greece, settled in the Edirne area (mainly in Kırklareli) and became known as Karadjovalides after the Turkish name of Moglena.

The number of these Megleno-Romanian families settled in Kırklareli were more than 110, while those settled in small villages were around 400: in total, nearly 2,000 Megleno-Romanians. Currently, they number only 500, concentrated in Kırklareli and culturally assimilated into the Turks. Most of them speak the Turkish language, but are still bilingual at home.

== Cultural assets ==
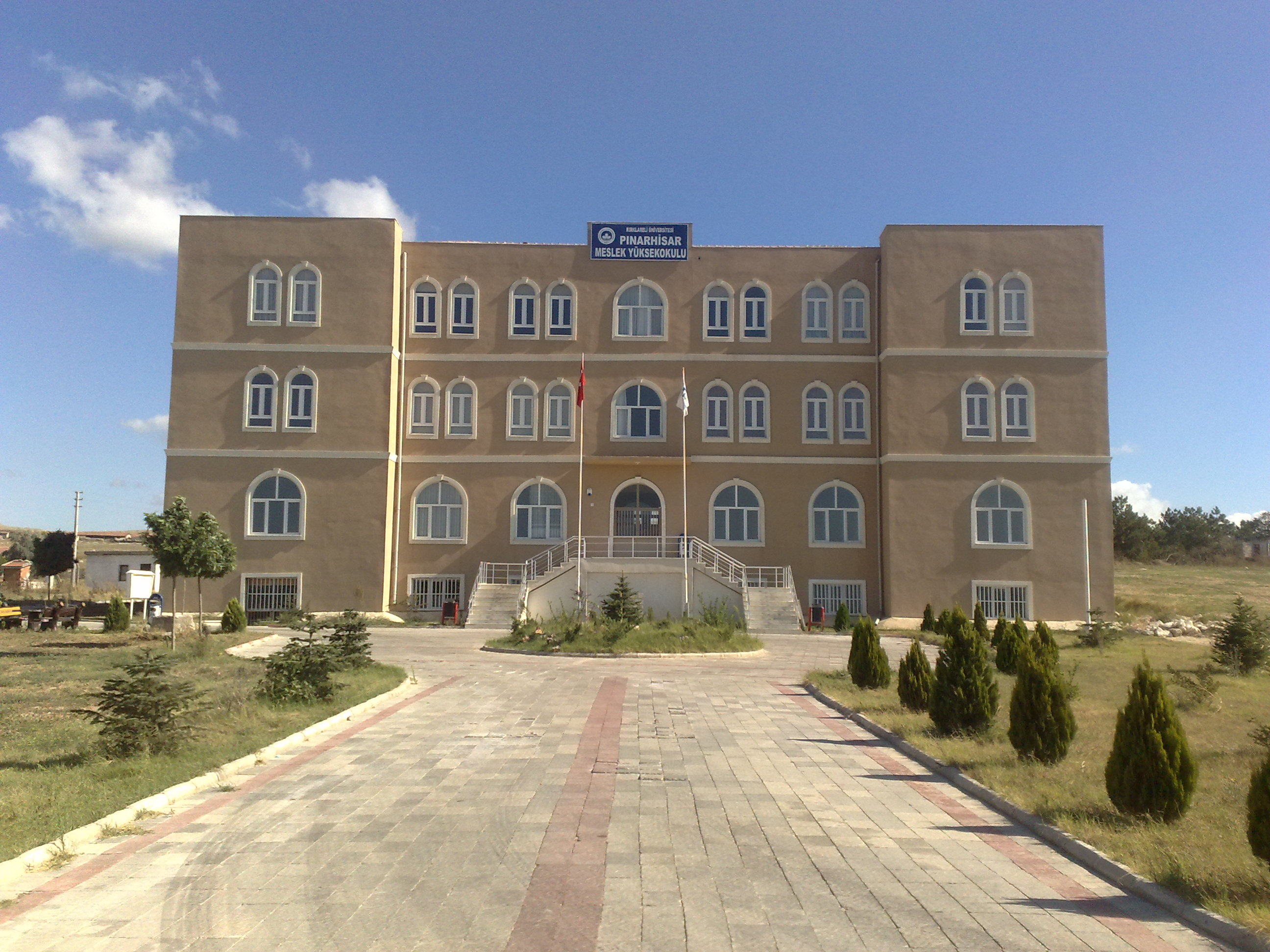
Pınarhisar Vocational School in Kırklareli.

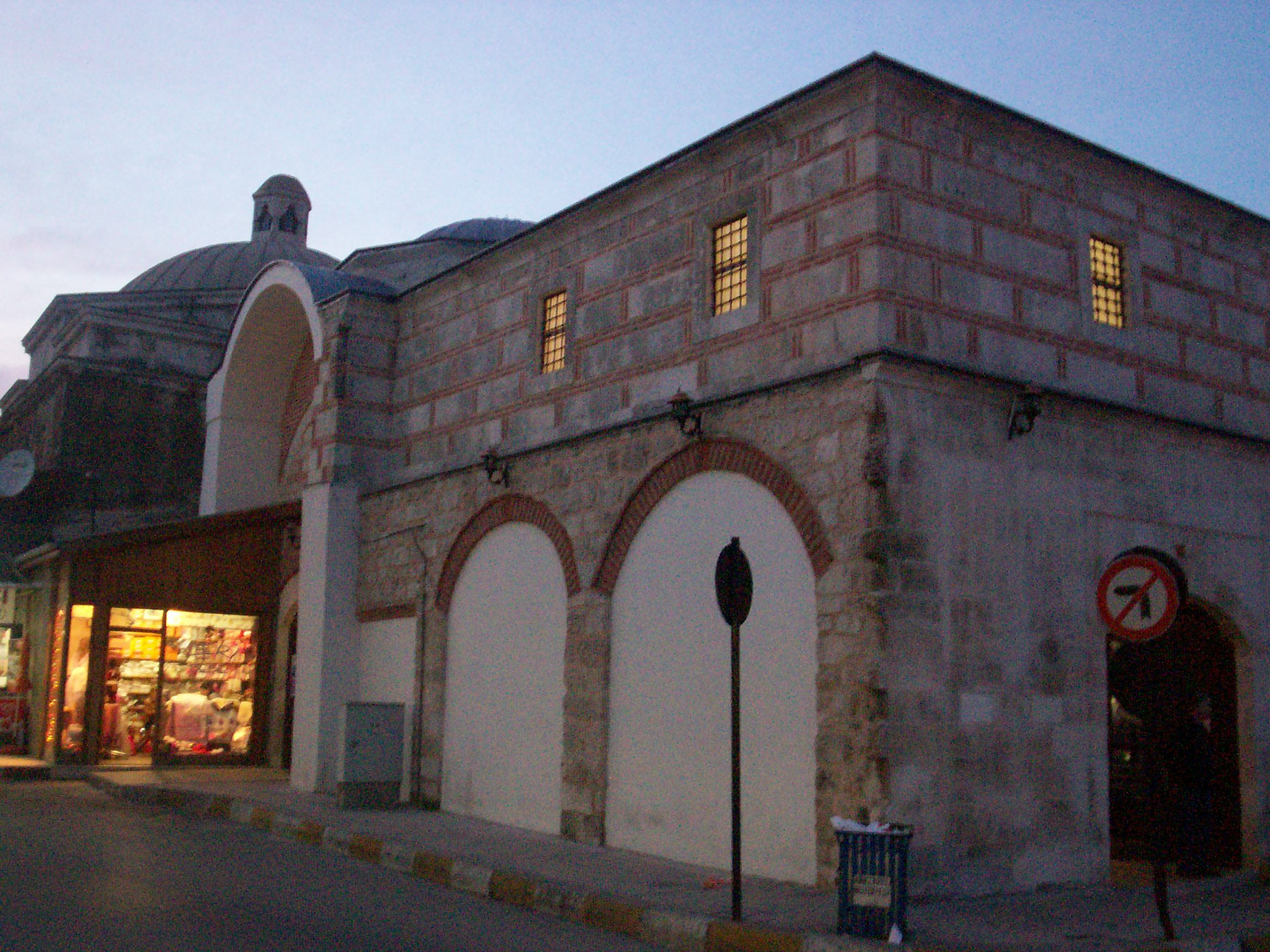
The Ottoman era Arasta adjacent to the Hızır Bey Mosque and Külliye.

- Hızır Bey Külliye: This külliye (religious complex) consists of the Hızır Bey Mosque, Hızır Bey Bath and Arasta (Bazaar.)
  - Hızır Bey Mosque: Located at the center of the city, it was built on a square plan by Köse Mihalzade Hızır Bey in 1383. Built of cut stone and having one minaret, it was restored by Yusuf Pasha of Aydost in 1824. Still used today, the final praying place and garden walls of the mosque were built afterwards.
  - Hızır Bey Bath: Also located at the center of the city and built adjacent to Bath and Arasta by Köse Mihalzade Hızır Bey in 1383. There are two entrances, one each for women and men, which are also called the "Paired Baths". According to an inscription in the women's bath, Hacı Hüseyin Ağa restored it between 1683 and 1704. Still used today, the outer walls are regular and built from coarse sandstone. It's a hamam (bathhouse) in the traditional Ottoman architecture style.
  - Arasta (Bedesten): Built adjacent to the Hızır Bey Bath in a "T" form, it has arch-type walls. The upper cover is a vault 15 m long. There were 12 shops inside formed by three beams. It was restored in 1704.
- Kırklareli Museum: A natural history, ethnography and archaeology museum.
- Dupnisa Cave: Kırklareli Province is also host to the only cave that is open to tourists in Thrace, the Dupnisa Cave near the village of Sarpdere, which is believed to have formed circa 4 million years ago. The Dupnisa Cave was used for Dionysian Rituals (Sparagmos) in ancient times. Even the name of Dionysus is associated with Mount Nisa right above the cave of Dupnisa; as, according to ancient Greek mythology, Dionysus "discovered wine while playing at Mount Nisa." The Bulgarian name of Kırklareli, Lozengrad (Лозенград) which means Vineyard Town may also have its origins in this ancient Greek myth.
- Demirköy Foundry: Archaeological site of a historic iron foundry, where cannonballs fired during the Conquest of Constantinople in 1453 were manufactured.

== Climate ==
Kırklareli has a borderline Mediterranean and humid subtropical climate (Köppen climate classification: Csa/Cfa, Trewartha climate classification: Do). Summers are hot and humid whilst winters are cool, cloudy and damp. Rainfall is somewhat common throughout the year, but is lower in amount and intensity than in coastal cities, largely due to the rain shadow caused by the Istranca massif to the immediate northeast. Snowfall is somewhat common between the months of December and March, snowing for a week or two.

Highest recorded temperature:42.5 °C (108.5 °F) on 27 July 2000
Lowest recorded temperature:−15.8 °C (3.6 °F) on 14 January 1972

Climate data for Kırklareli (1991–2020, extremes 1959–2023)
Month	Jan	Feb	Mar	Apr	May	Jun	Jul	Aug	Sep	Oct	Nov	Dec	Year
Record high °C (°F)	18.9 (66.0)	23.1 (73.6)	25.7 (78.3)	31.5 (88.7)	36.0 (96.8)	40.4 (104.7)	42.5 (108.5)	40.4 (104.7)	38.8 (101.8)	37.4 (99.3)	28.9 (84.0)	21.6 (70.9)	42.5 (108.5)
Mean daily maximum °C (°F)	7.2 (45.0)	9.2 (48.6)	12.8 (55.0)	18.4 (65.1)	24.0 (75.2)	28.7 (83.7)	31.3 (88.3)	31.5 (88.7)	26.6 (79.9)	20.1 (68.2)	14.0 (57.2)	8.7 (47.7)	19.4 (66.9)
Daily mean °C (°F)	3.3 (37.9)	4.5 (40.1)	7.5 (45.5)	12.4 (54.3)	17.6 (63.7)	22.1 (71.8)	24.6 (76.3)	24.6 (76.3)	19.9 (67.8)	14.6 (58.3)	9.5 (49.1)	5.0 (41.0)	13.8 (56.8)
Mean daily minimum °C (°F)	0.3 (32.5)	1.0 (33.8)	3.4 (38.1)	7.3 (45.1)	12.0 (53.6)	16.1 (61.0)	18.4 (65.1)	18.6 (65.5)	14.5 (58.1)	10.3 (50.5)	6.0 (42.8)	2.1 (35.8)	9.2 (48.6)
Record low °C (°F)	−15.8 (3.6)	−15.0 (5.0)	−11.8 (10.8)	−3.0 (26.6)	1.4 (34.5)	5.8 (42.4)	8.8 (47.8)	8.7 (47.7)	3.0 (37.4)	−3.4 (25.9)	−7.2 (19.0)	−11.1 (12.0)	−15.8 (3.6)
Average precipitation mm (inches)	61.9 (2.44)	48.3 (1.90)	48.8 (1.92)	39.1 (1.54)	53.6 (2.11)	56.2 (2.21)	34.2 (1.35)	19.1 (0.75)	39.9 (1.57)	60.6 (2.39)	62.4 (2.46)	61.5 (2.42)	585.6 (23.06)
Average precipitation days	9.7	8.27	9.83	9.9	9.77	8.93	4.93	3.37	5.4	7.73	7.8	10.6	96.2
Average snowy days	2.9	1.5	0.8	0	0	0	0	0	0	0	0.3	1.7	7.2
Average relative humidity (%)	78.5	75.1	71.7	65.6	63.9	61.3	58.2	58.3	63.9	73.5	77.5	78.8	68.9
Mean monthly sunshine hours	71.3	81.9	130.2	165.0	226.3	234.0	266.6	266.6	189.0	136.4	90.0	65.1	1,922.4
Mean daily sunshine hours	2.3	2.9	4.2	5.5	7.3	7.8	8.6	8.6	6.3	4.4	3.0	2.1	5.3
Source 1: Turkish State Meteorological Service
Source 2: NOAA(humidity), Meteomanz (snowy days 2013-2023)

== Sister cities ==
Kırklareli is twinned with:

- Manisa, Turkey

== Notable natives ==
- Anthim I (1816-1888), first head of the Bulgarian Exarchate
- Nikola Aslanov (1875-1905), Bulgarian revolutionary
- Işıl Yücesoy (born 1945), actress and singer
- Candan Erçetin, (born 1961), female singer, songwriter and Vice-President of Galatasaray SK
- Şaban Erden (born 1949), Deputy Secretary General of the Istanbul Metropolitan Municipality
- Barış Hersek (born 1988), professional basketball player
- Seda Kaçan (born 1994), racing driver
- Nikolaos Mavridis (1869-1927), wine merchant
- Ayşenur Taşbakan (born 1982), European champion female taekwondo practitioner
- Burak Akkul (born 1972), humorist
- Serap Belet (born 1978), anchorwomen
- Burhan Öçal (born 1959), percussion artist

== See also ==
- Battle of Kirk Kilisse

== Sources ==
- Karpat, Kemal (1985). OTTOMAN POPULATION, 1830-1914: Demographic and Social Characteristics. The University of Wisconsin Press. ISBN 0-299--09160-0.
