= Settai Station =

Railway station in Miyako, Iwate Prefecture, Japan

Coordinates: 39°48′33.51″N 141°57′43.74″E

Settai Station 摂待駅
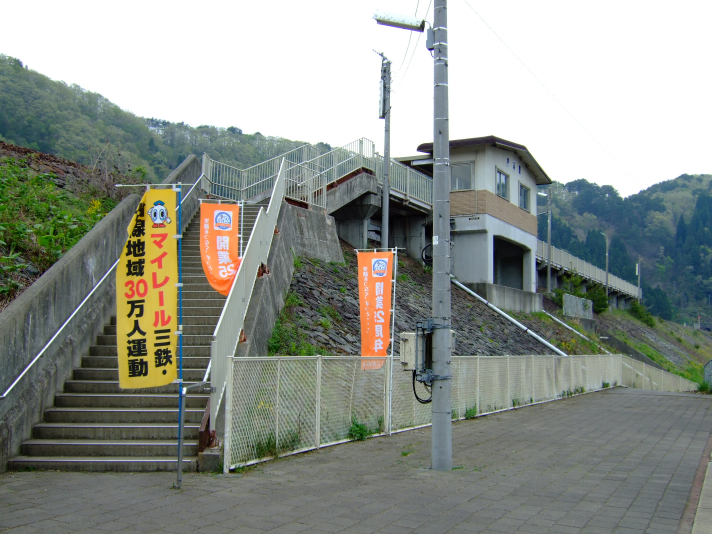
- Settai Station in May 2009

General information
- Location: Tarō-aze Settai, Miyako-shi, Iwate-ken 027-0000; Japan
- Operator: Sanriku Railway Company
- Line: ■ Rias Line
- Distance: 113.5 km from Sakari
- Platforms: 1 side platform
- Tracks: 1

Construction
- Structure type: At grade

Other information
- Status: Unstaffed
- Website: Official website

History
- Opened: 1 April 1984

Passengers
- FY2015: 7 daily
Location
- Location within Japan

Settai Station (摂待駅, Settai-eki) is a railway station on the Sanriku Railway Company’s Rias Line in the city of Miyako, Iwate Prefecture, Japan.

== Lines ==
Seta Station is served by the Rias Line, and is located 113.5 kilometers from the terminus of the line at Sakari Station.

== Station layout ==
Settai Station has a single side platform serving a single bi-directional track. There is no station building, but only a rain shelter on the platform.

== Adjacent stations ==
←	Service	→
Rias Line
Shin-Tarō	Local	Iwaizumi-Omoto

== History ==
Settai Station opened on 1 April 1984, the same day of the privatization of the Japanese National Railways (JNR) Kuji Line (which became the Sanriku Railway Company). During the 11 March 2011 Tōhoku earthquake and tsunami, part of the tracks and the station building at Shimanokoshi were swept away, thus suspending services on a portion of the Sanriku Railway. However, the portion of the line from Omoto to Tarō resumed operations on 29 March 2011, and the portion from Omoto to Tanohata from 6 April 2014. Minami-Rias Line, a portion of Yamada Line, and Kita-Rias Line constitute Rias Line on 23 March 2019. Accordingly, this station became an intermediate station of Rias Line.

== Passenger statistics ==
In fiscal 2015, the station was used by 7 passengers daily.

== Surrounding area ==
- National Route 45

== See also ==
- List of railway stations in Japan
