= Avi Saban =

Israeli footballer (born 1989)

Avi Saban אבי סבן
Personal information
- Full name: Avi Saban
- Date of birth: 10 May 1989 (age 37)
- Place of birth: Netanya, Israel
- Position: Defender

Youth career
- Beitar Nes Turbruk

Senior career*
Years	Team	Apps	(Gls)
2007–2009	Beitar Nes Turbruk	23	(0)
2009	Hapoel Pardesiya	3	(0)
2009–2012	Maccabi HaSharon Netanya	46	(1)
2012–2014	F.C. Tira	52	(2)
2014–2015	Maccabi HaSharon Netanya	0	(0)
- * Club domestic league appearances and goals

Avi Saban (Hebrew: אבי סבן; born 10 May 1989) is an Israeli football player.

He is the younger brother of Klemi Saban.
