= Shaban, Lorestan =

Shaban شعبان
- Village
- Location within Iran
- Coordinates: 33°11′20″N 48°43′34″E
- Country: Iran
- Province: Lorestan
- County: Khorramabad
- Bakhsh: Papi
- Rural District: Chamsangar

Population (2006)
  - Total: 38
- Time zone: UTC+3:30 (IRST)
  - Summer (DST): UTC+4:30 (IRDT)

Shaban (Persian: شعبان, also Romanized as Sha‘bān; also known as Shabāndar) is a village in Chamsangar Rural District, Papi District, Khorramabad County, Lorestan Province, Iran. At the 2006 census, its population was 38, in 5 families.
