= Nagwa Shaaban =

Egyptian writer (1959–2019)

- Born: 6 August 1959; Damietta, Egypt
- Died: 30 August 2019 (aged 60)
- Education: Cairo University
- Occupations: Writer; translator

Nagwa Shaaban (6 August 1959 – 30 August 2019) was an Egyptian writer of novels and translator. She worked as a cultural officer and translator of English articles into Arabic for Middle East News Agency. Shaaban authored three novels, earning the Sharjah Girls' Clubs Awards for the 1995 work Al-Ghar and the State Encouragement Award from the Ministry of Culture of Egypt in 2004 for Nawat Al-Karam published two years earlier.

== Biography ==
She was born in Damietta, Egypt. Shaaban was a graduate of the Faculty of Media, Cairo University with a Bachelor of Arts degree. She went on to obtain a diploma from the International Labour Organization.and got employment as a cultural officer for the Middle East News Agency (MENA). Shaaban also translated into Arabic from English several artistic, cultural, political and psychological articles for the MENA, from multiple English-language newspapers such as The Times in the United Kingdom. She conducted presentations of recently released books. Shaaban also finished two research papers on plastic art in the United States, a topic she had an interest in and one of those papers influenced Shahla Al-Ajili to write the novel Nawat Al-Karam. She wrote critical reviews on the works of Egyptian novelists.

In 1995, Shaaban authored the early short stories collection The Labyrinths as her first literary work. Three years later, she authored and published her first novel Al-Ghar that explored family roots and the practice of slave smuggling in spite of Isma'il Pasha attempting to abolish the practice. The novel earned Shaaban the Sharjah Girls' Clubs Award. She wrote her second novel, Nawat Al-Karam, which was based on history and first published by the Cairo-based Merit Publishing House in 2002; she had completed it on 15 May 2001. Shaaban was named the winner of the State Encouragement Award by the Ministry of Culture of Egypt in 2004 for her work on the novel. Her final novel, Al-Mursi, was published by The New Culture House in 2008. She had ceased her literary working in the final years of her life.

== Personal life ==
Shaaban was married and had one son with her husband. On 30 August 2019, she died after a struggle with ill health. A memorial ceremony for Shabban was organised by the Batana Publishing Foundation on 4 September 2019.

== Style ==
Masrawy wrote that her writing style in Nawat al-Karam was "A mixed reality with myths, with tired human beings governed by a brute authority, and all beings, people, animals, plants and inanimate objects coexist in it, and many similarities and opposites are present, so that all these elements interact on the shoulders of a remarkable narrative, giving its creator a special taste in the current Egyptian literary scene." Alqabas observed that "she is not concerned with monitoring major events or well-known personalities whose history everyone knows by referring to historical sources, but it is concerned with those who have history on their shoulders without having the opportunity to write this history, because this opportunity is almost dependent on those who own the order of the history writers themselves."
