= Tarō Station =

Railway station in Miyako, Iwate Prefecture, Japan

Tarō Station 田老駅
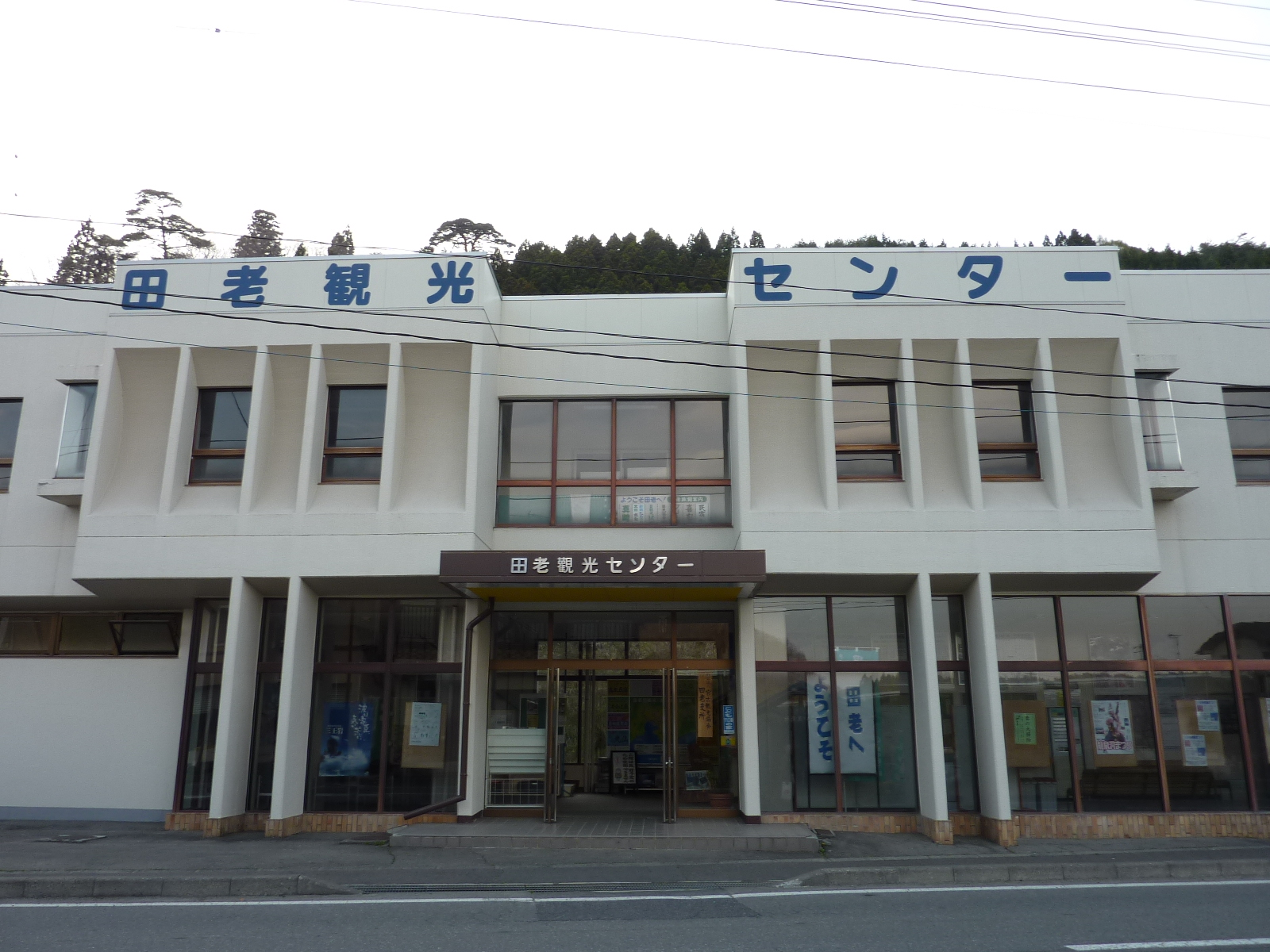
- Tarō Station in May 2010

General information
- Location: Tarō-aze Kobayashi, Miyako-shi, Iwate-ken 027-0000; Japan
- Coordinates: 39°43′54.47″N 141°57′52.74″E
- Operator: Sanriku Railway Company
- Line: ■ Rias Line
- Distance: 104.7 km from Miyako
- Platforms: 1 island platform
- Tracks: 2

Construction
- Structure type: At grade

Other information
- Status: Staffed
- Website: Official website

History
- Opened: 27 February 1972

Passengers
- FY2015: 57 daily
Location
- Location within Japan

Tarō Station (田老駅, Tarō-eki) is a railway station on the Sanriku Railway Company’s Rias Line located in the city of Miyako, Iwate Prefecture, Japan.

== Lines ==
Tarō Station is served by the Rias Line, and is located 104.7 rail kilometers from the terminus of the line at Sakari Station.

== Station layout ==
Tarō Station has a single island platform. The station is staffed.

=== Platforms ===
1	■ Sanriku Railway	for Miyako, Kamaishi, and Sakari
2	■ Sanriku Railway	for Kuji

== Adjacent stations ==
←	Service	→
Sanriku Railway Company
Sabane	Local	Shin-Tarō

== History ==
Tarō Station opened on 27 February 1972 as a station on the Japan National Railways (JNR) Kuji Line. On 1 April 1984, upon the privatization of the Kuji Line, the station came under the control of the Sanriku Railway Company. During the 11 March 2011 Tōhoku earthquake and tsunami, part of the tracks and the station building at Shimanokoshi were swept away, suspending services on a portion of the Sanriku Railway. However, the portion of the line from Miyako to Tarō resumed operations on 20 March 2011, and the portion from Tarō to Omoto from 29 March 2011. Minami-Rias Line, a portion of Yamada Line, and Kita-Rias Line constitute Rias Line on 23 March 2019. Accordingly, this station became an intermediate station of Rias Line.

== Passenger statistics ==
In fiscal 2015, the station was used by 57 passengers daily.

== Surrounding area ==
- National Route 45
- Tarō Post Office

== See also ==
- List of railway stations in Japan
