= Mario Javier Saban =

Argentine theologian (born 1966)

- Born: 12 February 1966; Buenos Aires, Argentina

Philosophical work
- Main interests: Origins of Christianity, Jewish philosophy

Mario Javier Sabán (Buenos Aires, 1966), is an Argentinian theologian of Sephardi origin.

== Early life ==
Mario Javier Sabán was born on 12 February 1966. He has a B.L. from University of Buenos Aires. His father was a Turkish Jew who had immigrated to Argentina.

== Career ==
Sabán began his historical investigations about the Jewish origins of the Argentina's traditional families in 1987. His first work, Converted Jews (1990), became a best-seller. In 2002, he migrated to Spain, where he published his book The Judaism of Saint Paul (2003).

In June 2007 he founded the organization Tarbut Sefarad, over which he presides. In March 2008 he obtained a doctorate in Philosophy from the Complutense University of Madrid. In June of the same year he published his doctoral thesis entitled Rambam, the genius of Moses Maimonides, based on his deep study of the Guide for the Perplexed. In September 2008 he published his eleventh work, The Judaism of Jesus, which is about the teachings of Jesus and their natural relation with Judaism.

None of Saban's books have been translated into English. Although one is advertised for sale with the title ″The Jewish Roots of Christianity,″ it is actually in Spanish.

== Published works ==
- Judíos conversos (1990).
- Los hebreos nuestros hermanos mayores or Judíos conversos II (1991).
- Los marranos y la economía en el Rio de la Plata or Judíos conversos III (1992).
- Mil preguntas y respuestas sobre el judaísmo español y portugués (1993).
- Las raíces judías del cristianismo (1994).
- El judaísmo de San Pablo (La matriz judía del cristianismo I, 2003).
- El sábado hebreo en el cristianismo (La matriz judía del cristianismo II, 2004).
- La matriz intelectual del judaísmo y la génesis de Europa (2005).
- La cronología del pensamiento judío (2007).
- Rambam, el genio de Maimónides (Doctoral thesis, 2008).
- El judaísmo de Jesús (2008).
- Sod 22: el secreto (1ª edición). Sabán. 2011. ISBN 978-987-23603-5-1. OCLC 810290720.
- Maase Bereshit: el misterio de la creación (1ª edición). Saban. 2013. ISBN 978-987-23603-6-8. OCLC 1056085951.
- Sinagoga-Iglesia: la ruptura del siglo II (1ª edición). Roxana Saban. 2016. ISBN 978-987-33-9954-1. OCLC 1002378627.
- La cábala: la psicología del misticismo judío (1ª edición). Editorial Kairós. 2017. ISBN 9788499884875. OCLC 1049148203.
- La Merkabá: el misterio del Nombre de Dios (1ª edición). Sabán Mario Javier. 2018. ISBN 9789874297631.
- 30 chispas de luz. Reflexiones cabalísticas para el día a dia. Mario Sabán. (2019). ISBN 9789878629933.
- Los Secretos de Dios-Sefer Atzilut: ¿Qué sucedió antes del Big Bang según la cábala? Mario Sabán. (2020). ISBN 9789878647449.
- Las estrategias del Satán: El mal desde la Cábala hebrea. Mario Sabán. Sabán. ISBN 9789878680750.
- Talmid Mekubal: Aprendiz de Cabalista. Mario Sabán en coautoría con Gio Sarmiento,. (2020). ISBN 9789878691312.
- Jesús Y La Cábala. Mario Sabán en coautoría con Ethel Turcios y Kenneth Menjivar. Sabán. (2021). ISBN 9789872360382.
- Daat. Las 44 energías ocultas del árbol de la vida La elevación de los niveles de conciencia según las antiguas enseñanzas cabalísticas. Mario Sabán. Jojmá ediciones. (2021). ISBN 9788412343595.
- Keter. El Éxtasis de la Eternidad. El poder de la Emuná desde la Cábala. Mario Sabán. editorial Kairós. (2023).
- Raz. El Mesías (enero de 2023)
- Joyas de la Cábala (febrero de 2024)
- El Misterio de la Cábala (junio de 2024) junto a Cuty Gorina

== See also ==
- The Guide for the Perplexed
