= Shin-Tarō Station =

Railway station in Miyako, Iwate Prefecture, Japan

Shin-Tarō Station 新田老駅
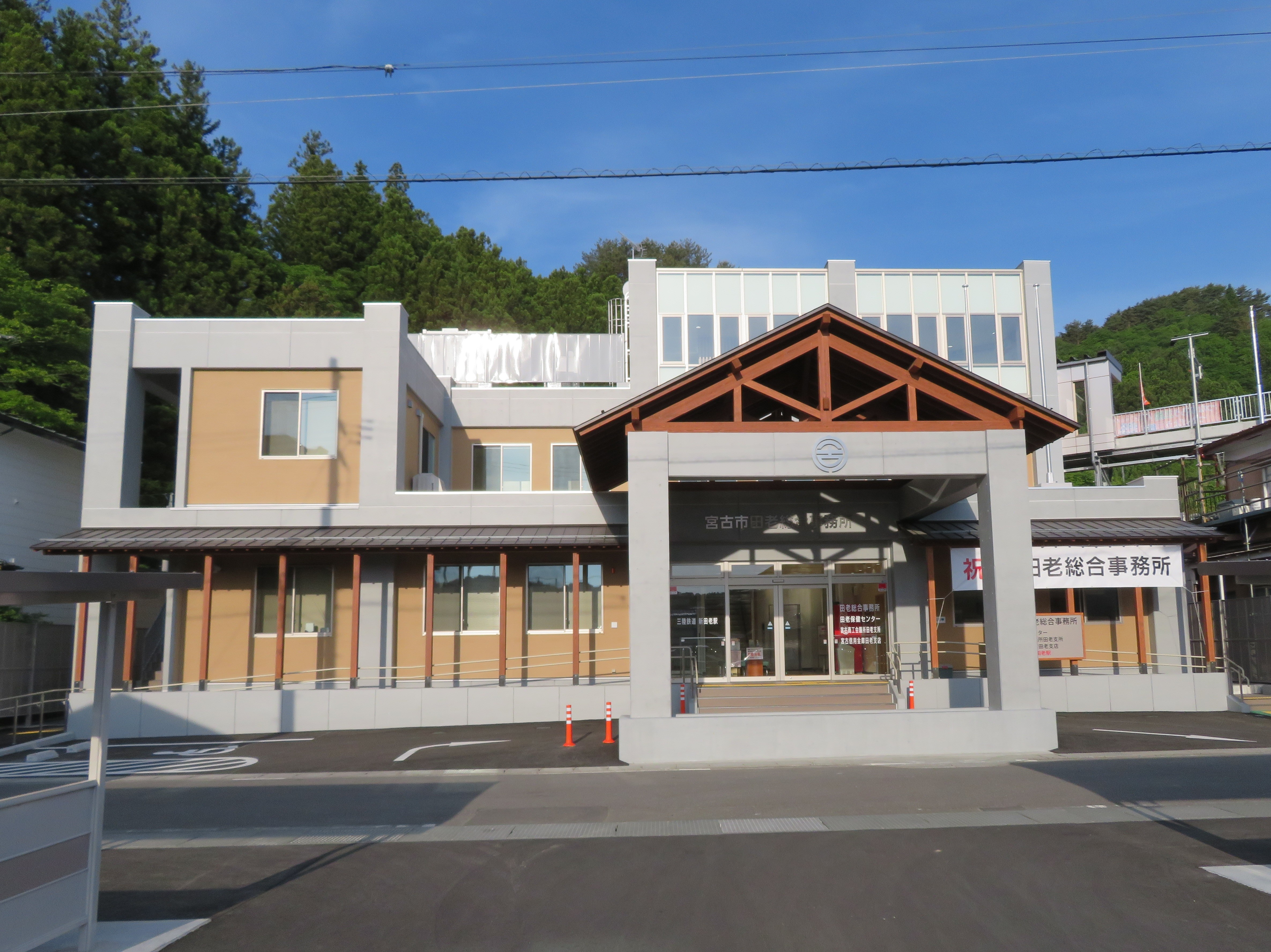

General information
- Location: 155-7 Tarō-ji tategamori, Miyako, Iwate （岩手県宮古市田老字館が森155-7） Japan
- Coordinates: 39.7356°N 141.9673°E
- Operator: Sanriku Railway
- Line: ■ Rias Line
- Distance: 105.2 km (65.4 mi) from Sakari
- Platforms: 1 side platform

History
- Opened: 18 May 2020

Services
Preceding station	Sanriku Railway	Following station
Tarō towards Sakari	Rias Line	Settai towards Kuji
Location

Shin-Tarō Station (新田老駅, Shin-Tarō-eki) is a Sanriku Railway Company station located in Miyako, Iwate Prefecture, Japan.

== Station layout ==
Shin-Tarō Station has a side platform serving a single track.

== History ==
Shin-Tarō station was opened between Tarō Station and Settai Station on 18 May 2020.

== Surrounding area ==
- National Route 45
