= Klemi Saban =

Israeli footballer

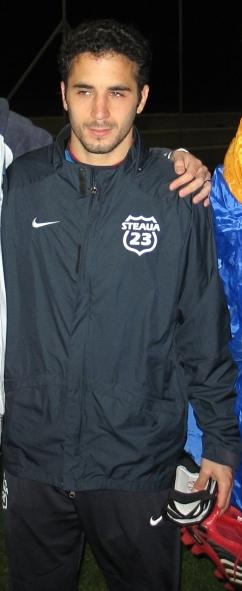

Personal information
- Full name: Rahamim Saban
- Date of birth: February 17, 1980 (age 46)
- Place of birth: Netanya, Israel
- Height: 1.73 m (5 ft 8 in)
- Position: Defender

Team information
- Current team: F.C. Ashdod (manager)

Youth career
- Maccabi Netanya

Senior career*
Years	Team	Apps	(Gls)
1998–2001	Maccabi Netanya	70	(1)
2001–2004	Hapoel Tel Aviv	42	(2)
2004–2005	Hapoel Petah Tikva	32	(0)
2005–2006	Maccabi Haifa	26	(0)
2006–2007	Steaua București	8	(0)
2007–2010	Maccabi Netanya	95	(0)
2010–2012	Maccabi Tel Aviv	31	(0)
2012–2013	Hapoel Be'er Sheva	18	(0)
2013–2014	Hapoel Acre	11	(0)
Total		334	(3)

International career
1999–2001	Israel U-21	11	(0)
2004–2010	Israel	25	(1)

Managerial career
- 2021: Hapoel Petah Tikva
- 2021–2022: Beitar Tel Aviv Bat Yam
- 2025: F.C. Ashdod
- * Club domestic league appearances and goals

Klemi Saban, (Hebrew: רחמים (קלמי) סבן; born February 17, 1980), is a retired Israeli football defender. Saban is mostly known for playing at Maccabi Netanya, there he played 6 years, captained the club and won over 200 caps in all club competitions.

== Biography ==
Rahamim (Klemi) Saban was born in Netanya. His younger brother Avi is also a footballer who played in the lower divisions of Israeli football. His father played at midfield for Beitar Netanya.

== Sports career ==
Saban began his career in Maccabi Netanya and then played for several teams – Hapoel Tel Aviv, Hapoel Petah Tikva and Maccabi Haifa- in Israel before joining Romanian club Steaua București on June 28, 2006.

Saban was signed by Steaua București in June 2006, and was set to become the first Israel to play in the Romanian Divizia A. But he ended up staying on the bench for Steaua's league opener and did not make his league debut until August 5, 2006. By then, Kobi Nachtailer had already become the first Israeli to play in the league because he started his club's (FC Vaslui) first match of the season.

His club debut came earlier though when he featured in a UEFA Champions League qualifying match against ND Gorica. Saban was responsible for Steaua's last goal of the match as he was tripped up in the penalty area and the official gave Steaua a penalty kick that sealed a 3–0 victory for them.

After one year in Romania Saban returned to Israel, to Maccabi Netanya and signed a four-year contract.

In June 2010 Saban signed a two-year contract with Maccabi Tel Aviv for a transfer fee of $180,000.

Saban was a member of the Israel team for which he won 25 caps. He also won 11 caps in the Under 21 squad. He scored his first goal on 10 September 2008 against Moldova in the World Cup 2010 qualifier.

== Honours ==
- Israeli Premier League
  - Winner (1): 2005–06
  - Runner-up (2): 2001–02, 2007–08
- Toto Cup
  - Winner (2): 2001–02, 2004–05
- Israeli Second Division
  - Winner (1): 1998–99
- Liga I
  - Runner-up (1): 2006–07

== See also ==
- Sports in Israel
