= Sabane Station =

Railway station in Miyako, Iwate Prefecture, Japan

Sabane Station 佐羽根駅
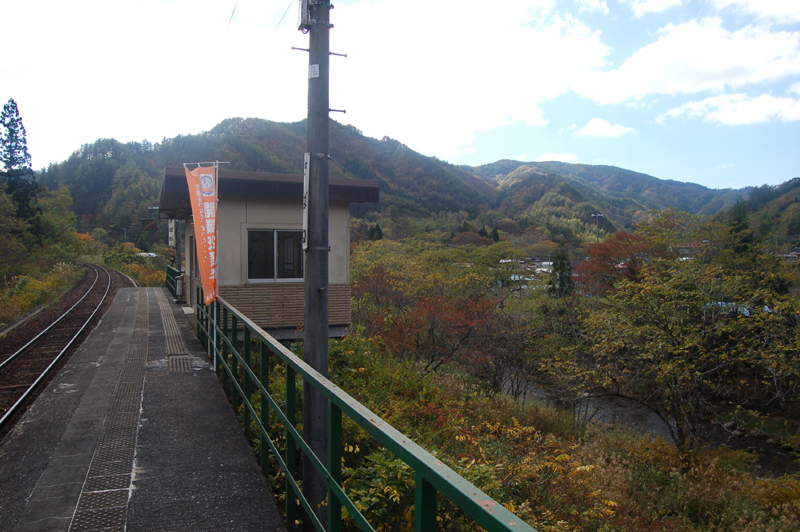
- Sabane Station in October 2009

General information
- Location: Tashiro, Miyako-shi, Iwate-ken 027-0067; Japan
- Coordinates: 39°42′40.24″N 141°56′8.96″E
- Operator: Sanriku Railway Company
- Line: ■ Rias Line
- Distance: 101.1 km from Sakari
- Platforms: 1 side platform
- Tracks: 1

Construction
- Structure type: At grade

Other information
- Status: Unstaffed
- Website: Official website

History
- Opened: 27 February 1972

Passengers
- FY2015: 3 daily
Location
- Location within Japan

Sabane Station (佐羽根駅, Sabane-eki) is a railway station on the Sanriku Railway Company’s Rias Line located in the city of Miyako, Iwate Prefecture, Japan.

== Lines ==
Sabane Station is served by the Rias Line, and is located 101.1 rail kilometers from the terminus of the line at Sakari Station.

== Station layout ==
The station has a single side platform serving a single bi-directional track. There is no station building, but only a rain shelter on the platform.

== History ==
Sabane Station opened on 27 February 1972 as a station on the Japan National Railways (JNR) Kuji Line. On 1 April 1984, upon the privatization of the Kuji Line, the station came under the control of the Sanriku Railway Company. During the 11 March 2011 Tōhoku earthquake and tsunami, part of the tracks and the station building at Shimanokoshi were swept away, suspending services on a portion of the Sanriku Railway. However, the portion of the line from Miyako to Tarō resumed operations on 20 March 2011. Minami-Rias Line, a portion of Yamada Line, and Kita-Rias Line constitute Rias Line on 23 March 2019. Accordingly, this station became an intermediate station of Rias Line.

== Adjacent stations ==
←	Service	→
Sanriku Railway Company
Ichinowatari	Local	Tarō

== Passenger statistics ==
In fiscal 2015, the station was used by 3 passengers daily.

== Surrounding area ==
Tajiro River

== See also ==
- List of railway stations in Japan
