= Şaban Erden =

Turkish politician

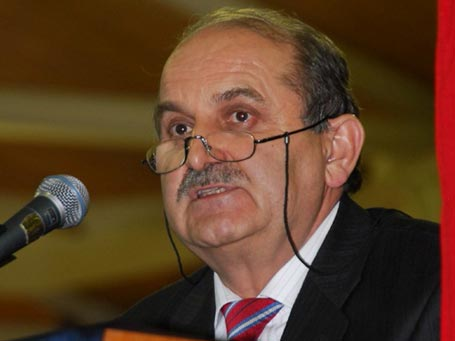

Deputy Secretary General of Istanbul Metropolitan Municipality
- In office 2007–2011

Personal details
- Born: 1949 (age 76–77) Kırklareli, Turkey

Şaban Erden who was born in Kırklareli in 1949, was the Deputy Secretary General of the Istanbul Metropolitan Municipality.

After the high school education at Kabataş Erkek Lisesi (Kabataş Erkek Lisesi), he graduated from the Civil Engineering Faculty of Istanbul Technical University (İTÜ) in 1972 with a Master of Science degree in Civil Engineering. He worked at the Ministry of Public Works and Settlement at Bandırma District Directorate as a Control Engineer during the construction of Bandirma Harbour. He completed his military service in 1974 and 1975. Afterwards, he worked for Azot Sanayii A.Ş., TÜGSAŞ A.Ş., Türkiye Milk Industry Company (SEK) and for the Prime Ministry Housing Development Administration (TOKİ). On 5.5.1994, while he was working at Gebze Institute of Technology as the Construction Works and Technical Department Director, he was assigned to Istanbul Metropolitan Municipality as the Director of the Department of Construction. Erden then became the Director at the Department of Projects in April 2001, and was appointed as Deputy Secretary General responsible from development activities in June 2002. Later, in February 2007, he was assigned as the Deputy Secretary General responsible for projects. Mr.Erden has three sons: İbrahim, Fatih and Salih. He speaks Turkish, Bosnian and French. He is a member of the board of trustees at International University of Sarajevo (IUS).

== See also ==
- Kadir Topbaş
