= History of the Jews in Catalonia =

Jewish community in Catalonia

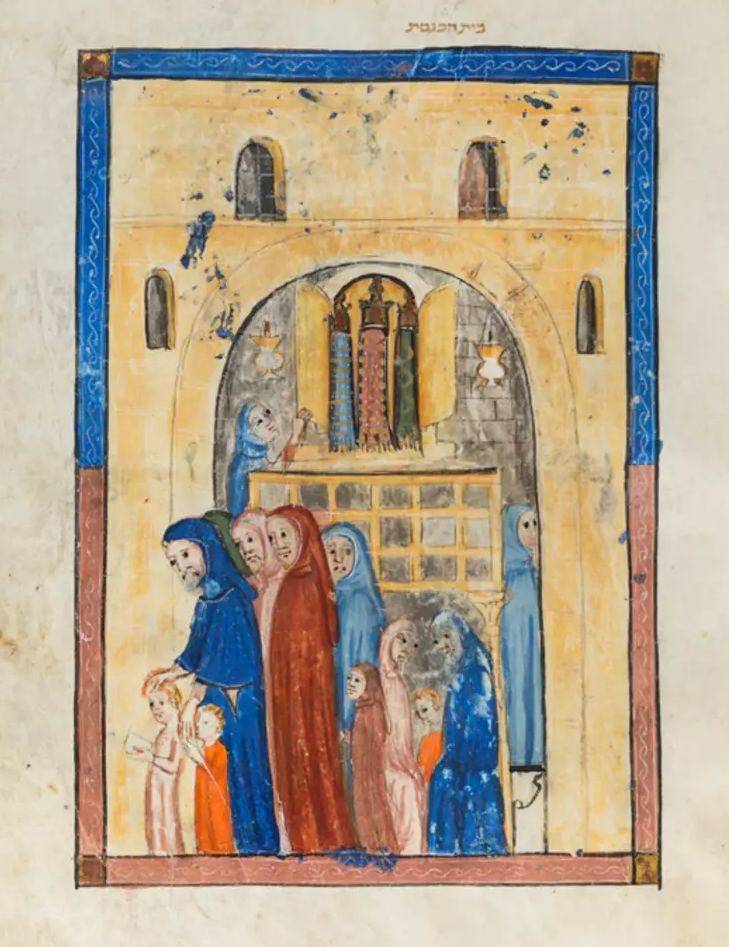
Synagogue in Catalonia. Sarajevo Haggadah, Barcelona ca. 1350.

Jews of Catalonia (Catalonian Jewry, Catalonian Judaism, in Hebrew: יהדות קטלוניה) is the Jewish community that lived in the Iberian Peninsula, in the Lands of Catalonia, Valencia and Mallorca until the expulsion of 1492. Its splendor was between the 12th to 14th centuries, in which two important Torah centers flourished in Barcelona and Girona. The Catalan Jewish community developed unique characteristics, which included customs, a prayer rite (Nusach Catalonia), and a tradition of its own in issuing legal decisions (Halakhah). Although the Jews of Catalonia had a ritual of prayer and different traditions from those of Sepharad, today they are usually included in the Sephardic Jewish community.

Following the expulsion of 1492, Jews who did not convert to Christianity were forced to emigrate to Italy, the Ottoman Empire, the Maghreb, North Africa and the Middle East.

== Early history ==
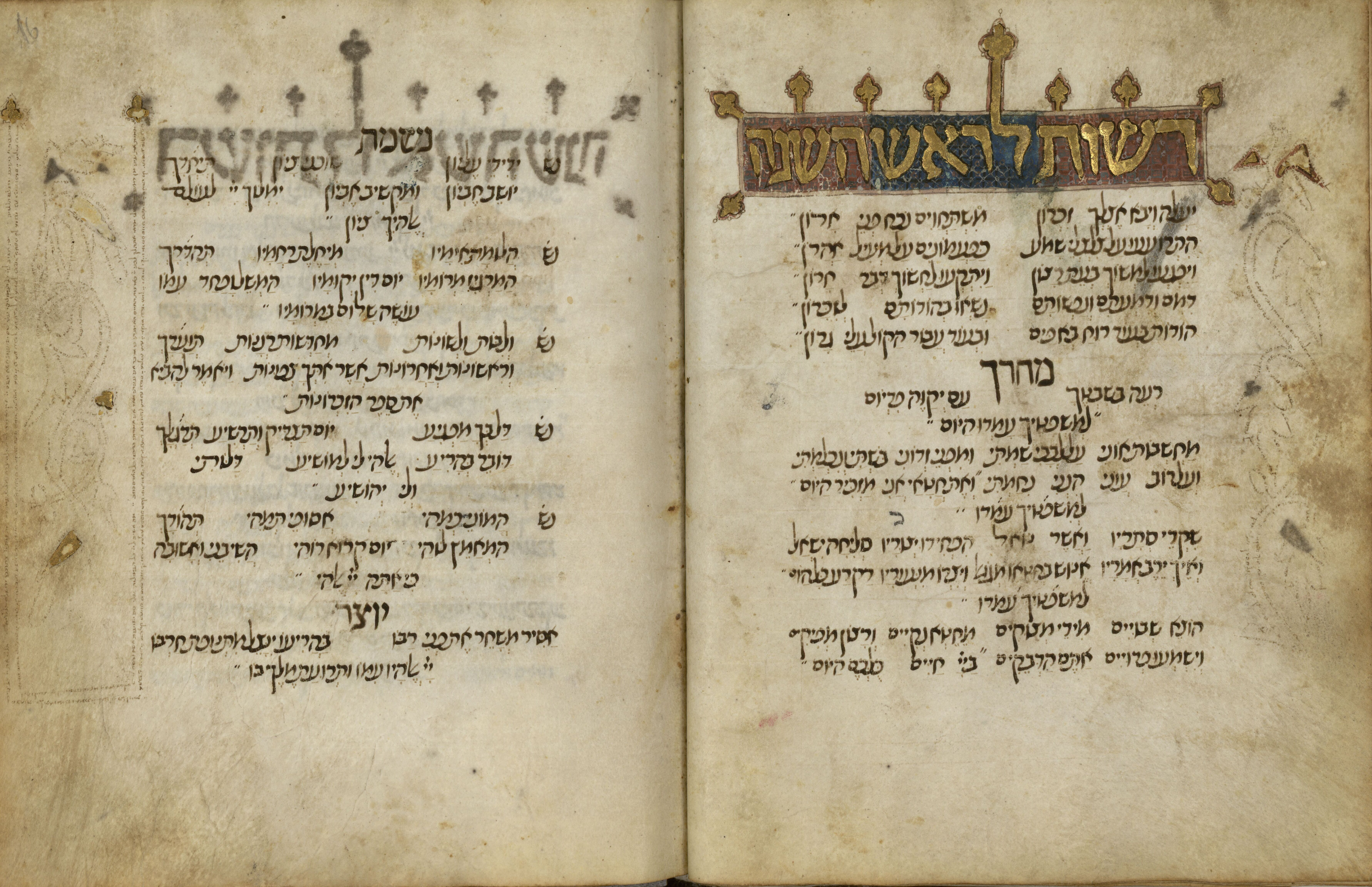
Catalan Mahzor, ca. 1280

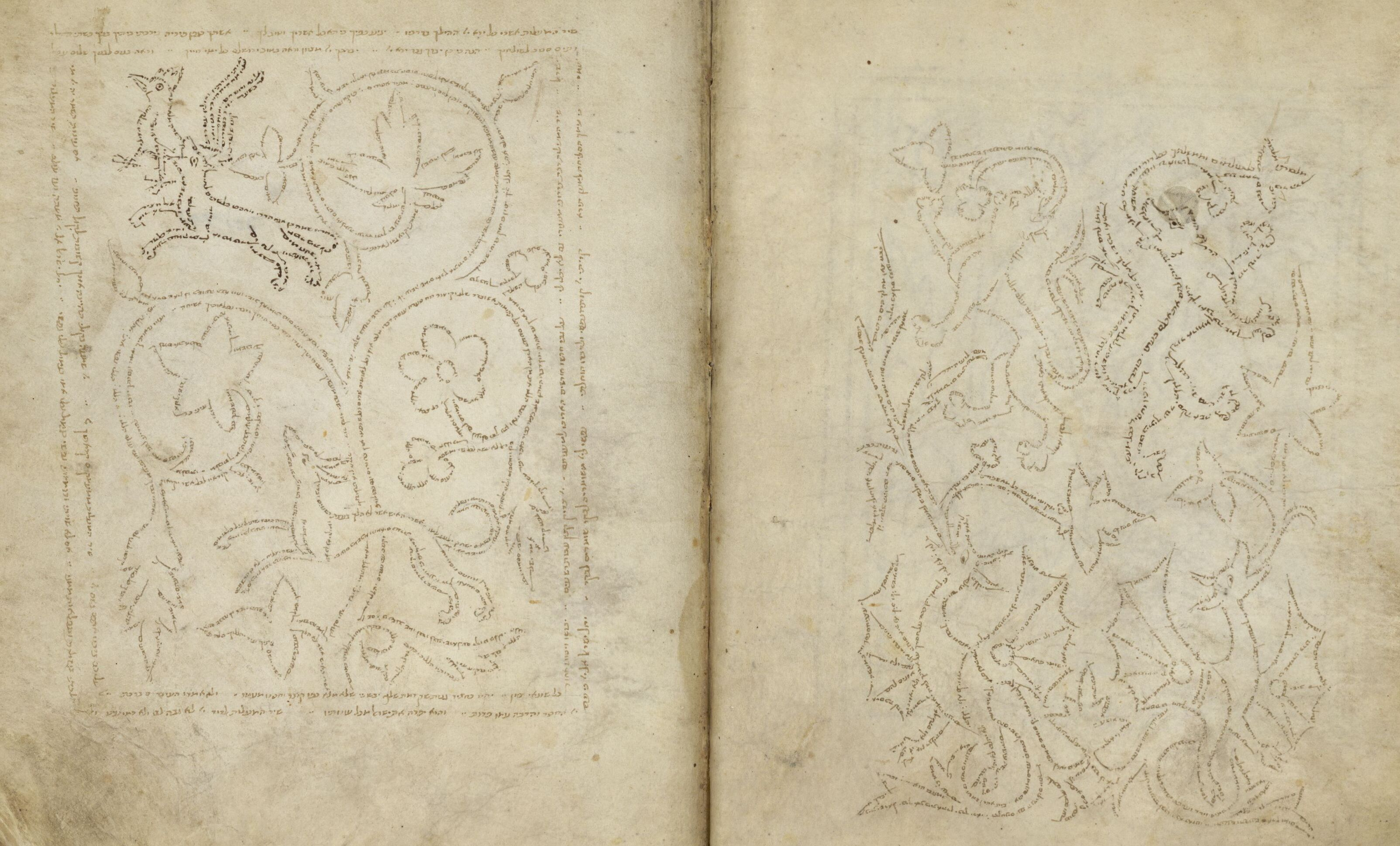
micrography in the Catalan Mahzor

Historians affirm that Jews arrived at the Iberian Peninsula before the destruction of the Second Temple, although the oldest gravestones date from the third century.

Aspamia, derived from Hispania, refers to the Roman Iberia. At the beginning of the 5th century, the peninsula was conquered by the Visigoths. During this period, numerous decrees were issued against the Jews, who were forcibly converted or expelled.

In 711, Muslims conquered Iberia. The areas under their rule were called al-Andalus. While little is known about the history of the Jews at the beginning of Islamic rule, we know the Jews began to use the term Sepharad.

In a process of territorial reoccupation known as the Reconquista, the Christian kingdoms progressively conquered all Islamic territories from north to south. With the Christian Reconquista, the territories occupied by the kingdoms of Castile and Portugal were also called by the Jews Sepharad, while Catalonia and the other kingdoms of the north were called Edom or named after Esau.

The reconquest of Catalonia began under the auspices of the Frankish kings, who forced the Muslims who had managed to cross the Pyrenees to retreat southward with the 732 Battle of Poitiers. All the lands they seized became counties and remained under the administrative organization of the Franks.

The Catalan counties, led by the counts of Barcelona, slowly broke free from Francia and began to govern themselves independently. Old Catalonia became a zone of containment, the "Spanish March", against the spread of Islam. Jews often moved from Sepharad (the Muslim zone) to the northern lands (the Christian kingdoms), and vice versa. The fact that many of them spoke Arabic and also the vernacular Romance languages enabled them to serve as translators and acquire important positions in both Muslim and Christian governments. Jews owned fields and vineyards, and many engaged in agriculture.

In this early period, the Jewish scholars of Catalonia who sought advanced Talmudic studies studied at Talmudic academies in the south. Those who wished to study science or linguistics went to Sepharad, as did Menahem ben Saruq (920-970), who was born in the Catalan city of Tortosa and moved with his family to Cordoba to study the Hebrew language under the patronage of Governor Samuel ibn Naghrillah.

Barcelona and Girona were known as important Jewish communities from the 9th century. In the 11th and 12th centuries, Barcelona was home to a beth din (rabbinical court) and an important center of Torah study. During this period, Barcelona became a link in the chain of transmission of the teachings of the Geonim.

Important Catalonian rabbis from this time are Isaac ben Reuben Albargeloni (1043 -?), Judah ben Barzillai, called Yehudah ha-Nasi of Barcelona (late 11th century, beginning of the 12th century) and Abraham bar Hiyya (late 11th century, first half of the 12th century). Barcelona was well-known as the city of the Nesiʾim (Biblical Hebrew: נְשִׂיאִים, plural of Nasiʾ), due to the great number of personalities who enjoyed this honorific title. We know that two of the great Hakhmei Provence, Isaac ben Abba Mari (1122-1193) and Abraham ben Isaac of Narbonne (1110-1179), moved to Barcelona.

Catalonia joined Provence in 1112 and Aragon in 1137, and thus Barcelona became the capital of the unified realm called the Crown of Aragon. The kings of the Crown of Aragon extended their domains to Occitania.

== 12th and 13th centuries ==
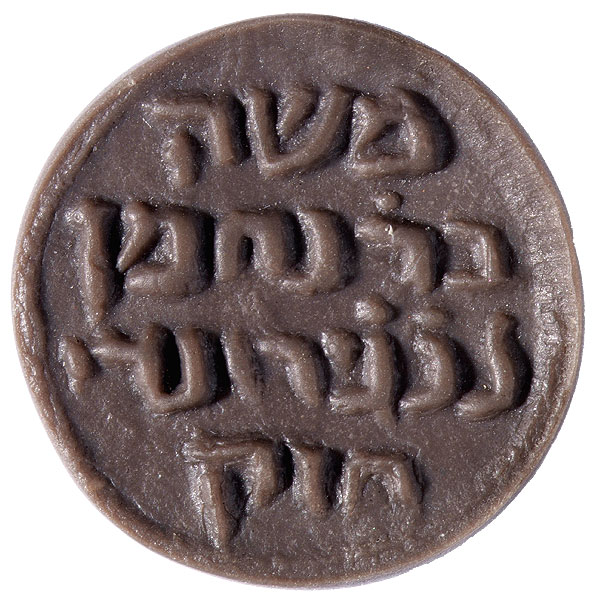
Seal attributed to Nachmanides [Copy from the Museum of History of the Jews in Girona]

In the 12th and 13th centuries the Catalonian Talmudic academies thrived. The great Rabbis and kabbalists Ezra and Azriel bene Shelomoh (late 12th century, beginning of the 13th century) disciples of the famous Rabbi Yitzchaq el Cec (the Blind) (1160-1235), son of Rabbi Avraham ben David (Raabad) of Posquières (1120-1198), stood out in the city of Girona. We can also include Rabbi Yaaqov ben Sheshet (12th century) among the Girona kabbalists of this period. Also, from Girona was Rabbi Avraham ben Yitzchaq he-Hazan (12th-13th centuries) author of the piyyut Achot qetanah (little sister). From the city of Girona was the greatest of Catalonian sages, Rabbi Moshe ben Nachman (Ramban, or Nachmanides) (1194-1270), whose Catalonian name was Bonastruc ça Porta.

Although the city of Girona was an important center of Torah that had a Bet Midrash (House of Study) dedicated to the study of the Kabbalah, the main city was Barcelona, where the Ramban served as the head of the community. During this period, Rabbi Yona Girondi (1210-1263) and his famous disciples Rabbi Aharon ben Yosef ha-Levi of Barcelona (Reah) (1235-1303) and Rabbi Shelomoh ben Adret (Rashba) (1235-1310). Also, Rabbi Asher ben Yechiel (Rosh) (1250-1327), his son Rabbi Yaaqov ben Asher (Baal ha-Turim) (1269-1343), and Rabbi Yom Tov ben Avraham ha-Sevilli (Ritba) (1250–1330), disciples of Rashba and Reah. We can say that at that time Barcelona became the most important Talmudic study center in all of the European Jewry. It was also during this time that certain Catalan Jewish families occupied key positions in the Catalonian economy, such as the Taroç family of Girona.

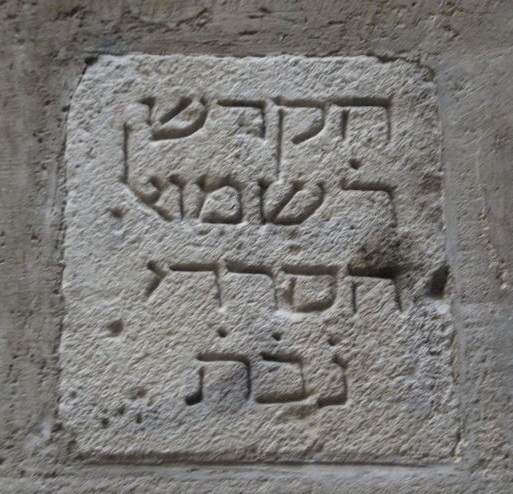
Heqdesh rabbi Shemuel ha-Sardi in the Old City of Barcelona.

In Catalonia in the 13th century Jews were victims of blood libels and were forced to wear a distinctive sign called Rodella. The authorities prohibited Jews from performing public office and were forced to participate in public disputes with representatives of Christianity, such as the Barcelona Disputation of 1263 in which the Ramban participate as a representative of Judaism. The Jews were private property of the monarchy who charged them taxes in exchange for protection.

The kings of the Crown of Aragon expanded the Catalan domains and conquered Mallorca, Valencia, Ibiza and Menorca. In 1258 they signed the Corbeil treaty with the French king for which they renounced to their rights over the Occitan lands. In return, the Franks resigned their demands on the Catalan lands.

== 14th century ==
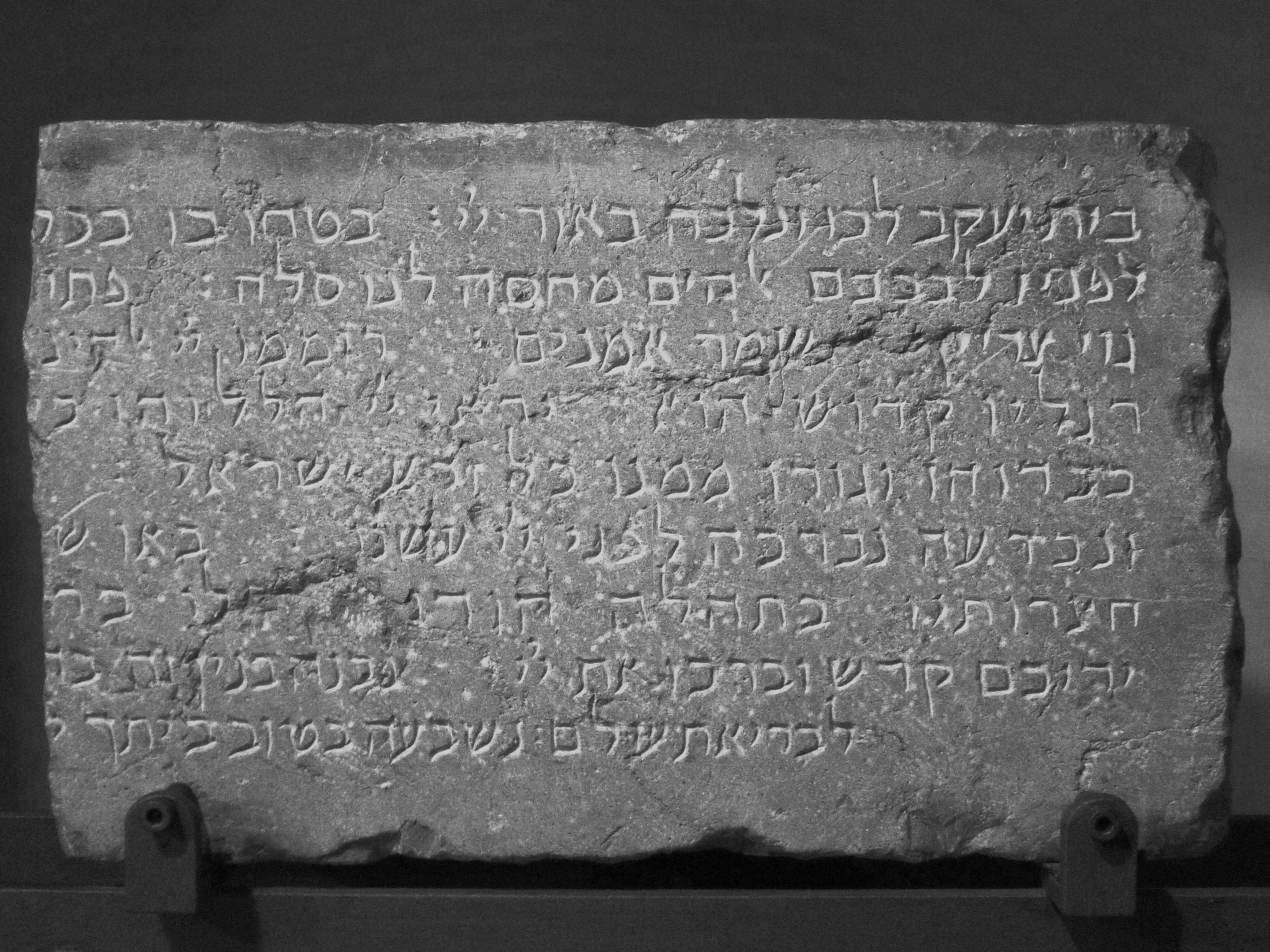
Stone commemorating the inauguration of a synagogue in Girona (14th century).

In the 14th century Christian fanaticism prevailed throughout the Iberian Peninsula and there were many persecutions against the Jews. We can mention among Catalonian sages of this period Rabbi Peretz ben Yitzchaq ha-Kohen (1304-1370) who was born in Provence but dwelled in Barcelona, Rabbi Nisim ben Reuven Girondi (Ran) (1315-1376) who served as a Rabbi in Barcelona, Rabbi Chasday ben Yehudah Cresques (the elder), Rabbi Yitzchaq bar Sheshet Perfet (Ribash) (1326-1408), Rabbi Chasday Cresques (Rachaq) (1340-1412), Rabbi Yitzchaq ben Moshe ha-Levi (Profiat Duran, ha-Ephody) (1350-1415), Rabbi Shimon ben Tzemach Duran (Rashbatz) (1361-1444). From this same period, we can include the cartographer of Mallorca Avraham Cresques (14th century) and the poet Shelomoh ben Meshullam de Piera (1310/50-1420/25).

Rabbi Nisim ben Reuven Girondi (Ran) resumed the activity of the Barcelona Yeshivah in the 50s and 60s, after the Jewish community was heavily affected by the Black Death in 1348. In 1370, Jews of Barcelona were victims of attacks instigated by a blood libel; a few Jews were assassinated and the secretaries of the community were imprisoned in the synagogue for a few days without food. Following the succession of John I of Castile, conditions for Jews seem to have improved somewhat. With John I even making legal exemptions for some Jews, such as Abraham David Taroç.

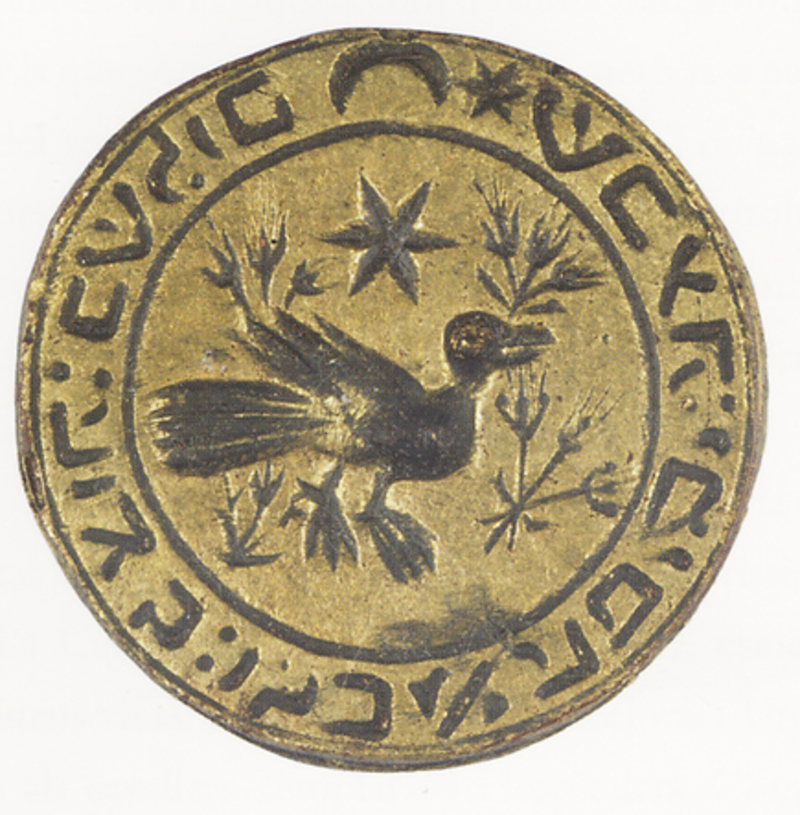
Seal for the Matsot (Passover bread), 14th century, copy from the History Museum of the Jews in Girona.

The end of the century brought the revolts of 1391. As a result of the riots, many Jews were forced to convert to Christianity and many others died as martyrs. Others succeeded in fleeing to North Africa (such as Ribash and Rashbatz), Italy and the Ottoman Empire. It was the end of the Jewish communities of Valencia and Barcelona. The community of Mallorca held out until 1435, when Jews were forced to convert to Christianity; the community of Girona barely endured until the expulsion of 1492.

Rabbi Chasday Cresques, in a letter he sent to the Jewish community of Avignon, offers us an account about the riots of 1391. In summary, we can conclude from his account that the riots began on the first day of the Hebrew month of Tammuz (Sunday, 4/6/1391) in Seville, Cordoba, Toledo and close to seventy other locations. From day seven of the month of Av (Sunday, 9/7/1391), they extended to other communities of the Crown of Aragon: Valencia, Barcelona, Lleida, Girona and Mallorca. During the 1391 attacks, the majority of the Jewish communities of Sepharad, Catalonia and Aragon were destroyed.

During the thirteenth, fourteenth and fifteenth centuries, the kings of the Crown of Aragon expanded their territories to the lands of the Mediterranean; they conquered Sicily (1282), Corsica (1297-1516), Athens (1311), Neopatria (1318), Sardinia (1323-1326) and Naples (1435-1442).

== 15th century ==
The fifteenth century was very hard for Jewish life in the Iberian Peninsula. The communities that survived the 1391 riots faced great pressure on the part of the church and the Christian population. The kings, who were in a difficult economic situation, imposed heavy taxes on Jewish communities. The lives of the “Converso” Jews who converted to Christianity was not easy either, the church called them “new Christians” and they always kept them under suspicion, since many of them accepted Christianity only as an outward pretense but actually maintained Judaism in secret. The Inquisition persecuted and punished the new Christians who observed the commandments of Judaism.

Catalonia hosted one of the longest disputes in the Middle Ages, the famous Dispute of Tortosa (1413-1414). In the 15th century, we find the poet Shelomoh ben Reuven Bonafed in Catalonia.

In 1469 King Fernando of Aragon (1452-1516) and Queen Isabel of Castile (1451-1504) married and unified the two kingdoms. In 1492 they completed the reconquest with the defeat of the Kingdom of Granada and expelled Jews from all of their kingdoms.

== The diaspora of the Jews of Catalonia ==
The first group of Jews were exiled from Catalonia in the wake of the 1391 attacks; they went mainly to Italy (Sicily, Naples, Rome, Livorno), North Africa (Algeria) and the Ottoman Empire (mainly Salonica, Constantinople and Palestine). The second group were expelled by the Catholic Monarchs. The Edict was decreed on March 31, 1492, and time was given until July 31 for Jews to sell up their property and leave. This date was the eve of the eighth of the month of Av in the Hebrew calendar that year; the expelled Jews were traveling by sea on Tisha B'Av, the 9th of Av, a day on which a number of disasters in Jewish history occurred. A large number of Jews converted to Christianity to be allowed to stay in Catalonia.

=== Settlement in Italy ===
Many of the Catalonian Jews arrived in Italy and found refuge in Sicily, Naples, Livorno and the city of Rome.

==== Sicily ====
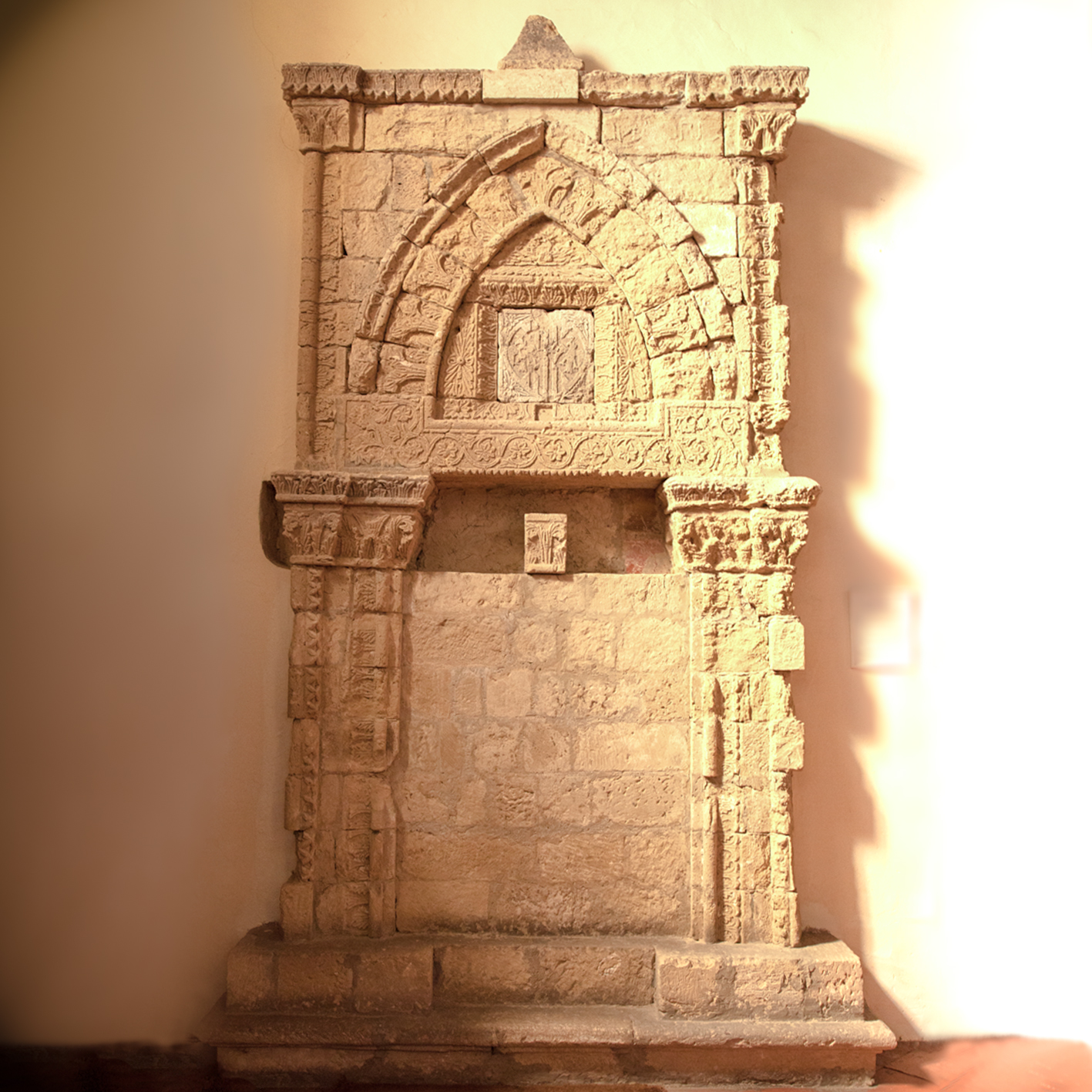
Aron ha-Qodesh (Torah Scrolls Ark) of the Catalonian Jewish community of Agira, Sicily (1453).

We know that Jews from the Iberian Peninsula settled in Sicily since the 11th century. The famous Kabbalist Rabbi Avraham Abulafia (1240-1291), who studied many years in Catalonia, settled in Sicily, where he wrote most of his works. Sicily had been part of the Catalan-Aragonese crown for many years and the Jewish communities remained on the island until the end of the 15th century, with the expulsion edict of the Jews of the island on June 18, 1492. We know of the existence of a Catalan Jewish community in the island thanks to the identification of a manuscript of the 14th century as siddur nusach Catalonia. In 2017, an old Aron ha-Qodesh (the sacred Ark of the synagogue where the Torah scrolls are stored) was rediscovered in the city of Agira. It was found in the church of Sancta Sanctorum Salvatore and commemorates the construction of the synagogue of the Catalan Jews in 1453, it is one of the oldest Aron ha-Qodesh in Europe.

==== Rome ====
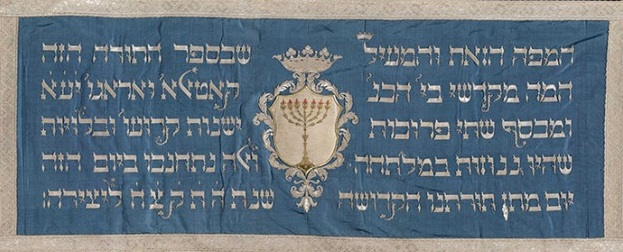
Banner of the Catalan-Aragonese Synagogue of Rome (1838).

Catalonian Jews were also exiled to the city of Rome. In 1517 the Catalonian Jewish community of Rome was well organized and built a synagogue following the minhag Catalonia (Schola hebreorum Nationis Catalanorum). In 1519 Pope Leo X (1475-1521) granted them a permit to widen the community and move the synagogue to a new location, allowed them to remodel and adapt it into a house of prayer according to their rites and customs. By the end of 1527, the Catalonian community and the Aragonese community decided to merge. The joint synagogue of Catalonia and Aragon changed its location again in 1549. In 1555, the community approved the expenses for the construction of another synagogue. The Catalan-Aragonese community fought to avoid merging with the Sephardic communities. All other communities from the Iberian Peninsula merged into a single united Iberian community in Rome, except for the Catalonians who joined the Aragonese. With the establishment of the ghetto in 1555, the Catalonian community maintained its own separate synagogue. In a census of 1868, it can be observed that of the total of 4995 Jews in Rome, 838 belonged to the community of Catalonia. In 1904 the Catalan synagogue ended up joining the other synagogues of Rome to form a single synagogue that was constructed on the banks of the Tiber River. Since then we have no information about the Catalonian community.

=== Settlement in the Ottoman Empire ===
The exiled Jews of Catalonia also migrated to the Ottoman Empire where they were organized in communities according to the place of origin that were called Qehalim. There were Catalonian Qehalim in Istanbul, Edirne, Salonica and Safed, among others.

==== The Catalonian Jewish Community of Salonica ====
The Jews of Catalonia formed a community in Salonica that was called “Catalan”. Despite being a minority, the Catalonian Jews fought to avoid merging with the Sephardic communities and maintained their ancient customs. The religious leaders of the holy communities of Catalonia in Salonica received the title of Marbitz Torah and not the title Rabbi. The first known was Eliezer ha-Shimoni, who arrived in Salonica in 1492. He had a great influence on all the communities of Salonica and was one of the first to sign the agreements (Haskamot) of the sages. Later we find Moshe Capsali. The chacham Yehudah ben Benveniste, also arrived after the expulsion and established a very important library. Another chacham from the Catalonian Jewish community was Rabbi Moshe Almosnino, Marbitz Torah, exegete and philosopher, son of Barukh Almosnino, who had rebuilt the Catalonian synagogue after the fire of 1545.

In 1515, the community was divided into two Qehalim that were called Catalan yashan (Old Catalan) and Catalan chadash (New Catalan).

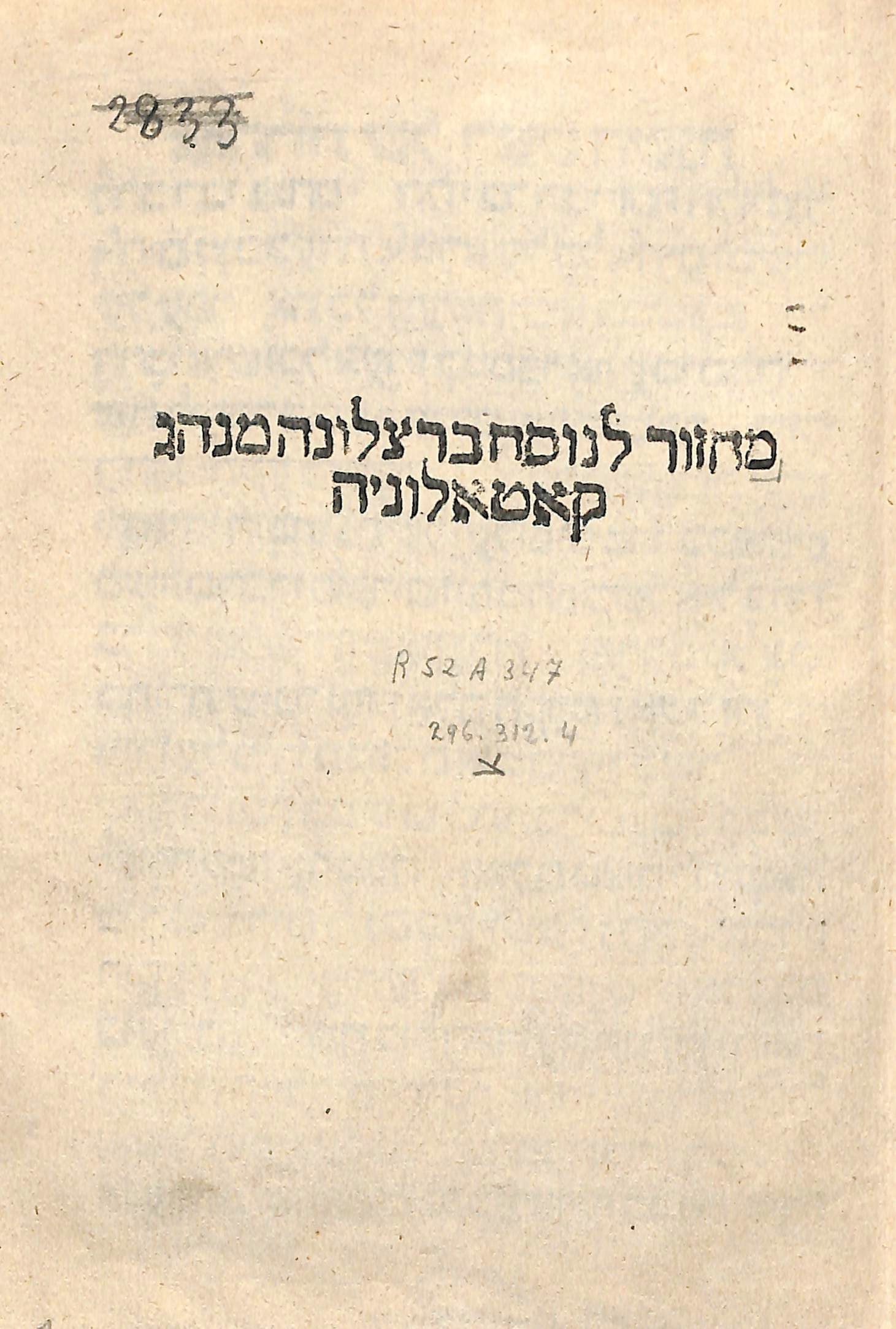
Machzor according to the rite of Barcelona and the custom of Catalonia. Salonica, 1527.

In 1526, the machzor of Yamim Noraim (Days of Awe), known as "Machzor le-nusach Barcelona minhag Catalunya" was first published. According to the colophon, the impression was finished on the eve of Yom Kippur of the year 5287 (1526).

Catalonian Jews published several reprints of the machzor in the nineteenth century. In 1863 they printed an edition titled "Machzor le-Rosh ha-Shana ve-Yom ha-Kippurim ke-minhag qahal qadosh Catalan yashan ve-chadash be-irenu zot Saloniki". This edition was published by Yitschaq Amariliyo.

In 1869 the "Machzor ke-minhag qahal qadosh Catalan yashan ve-chadash" was printed. The editors were: Moshe Yaaqov Ayash and Rabbi Chanokh Pipano, and those who carried out the impression were: David, called Bekhor Yosef Arditi, Seadi Avraham Shealtiel. The machzor was published under the title "Machzor le-Rosh ha-Shana kefi minhag Sepharad ba-qehilot ha-qedoshot Saloniqi" and includes the prayers of the community of Aragon and the communities Catalan yashan ve-chadash.

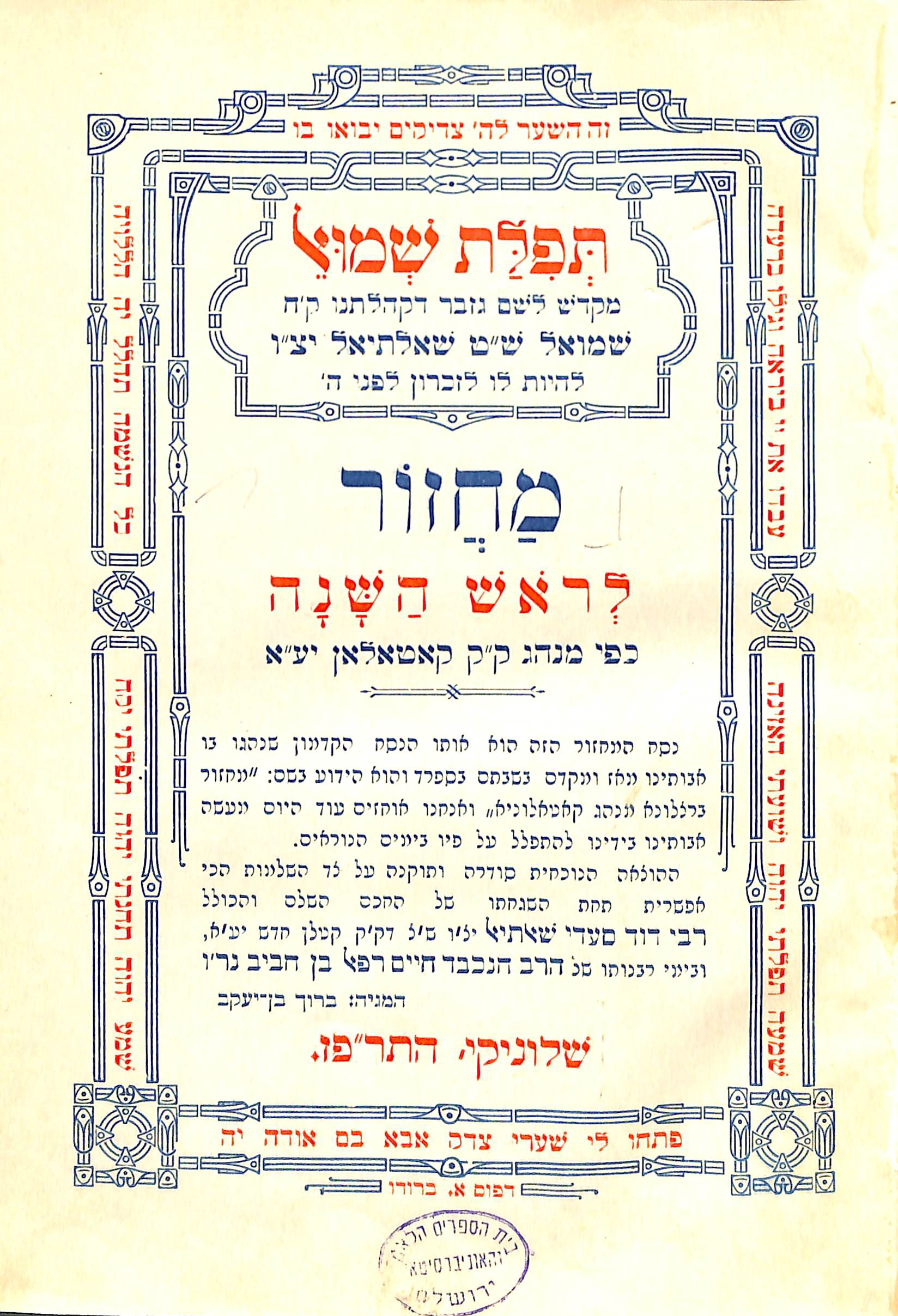
Machzor according to the custom of the Catalonian Holy communities (Vol. 1: Tefillat Shemuel). Salonica, 1927.

The Catalonian Jewish community of Salonica existed as such until the Holocaust. In 1927, they published a numbered edition in three volumes of the machzor, entitled "Machzor le-yamim noraïm Kefí Minhag q[ahal] q[adosh] Qatalan, ha-yadua be-shem nusach Bartselona minhag Qatalunya". In the second volume "Tefillat Yaaqov", there is a long historical introduction about the Jewish community of Catalonia and the edition of the machzor written in Judeo-Spanish; the same summary introduction is found in the first volume "Tefillat Shemuel ", written in Hebrew. Below is a fragment of the translation of the Hebrew version:

«One of the most precious pearls that our ancestors brought from the exile of Catalonia, when they had to leave as exiles, was the old order of the prayers of Rosh ha-Shana and Yom Kippur, known as the 'nusach Barcelona, minhag Catalunya'.

And because of the misfortunes and tumult of the exile, that arrived of fatal form on the poor wandering refugees, the majority of the customs were confused, and slowly, almost all were fused in the same order of prayers called 'nusach Sepharad', almost all, except some exceptional communities that did not change their customs.

The members of the Holy community Catalonia in our city of Salonica did not change their custom, and until today they maintain the tradition of their ancestors and offer their prayers to God on Days of Awe following the ancient nusach that they brought from Catalonia.

The Jews of Catalonia were the prominent among their brothers in the rest of the Sepharad countries and in their wisdom and science. The communities of Barcelona always took pride in the fact that Rabbis and personalities from their community illuminated the eyes of the whole Jewish diaspora. There was a saying that Sephardic Jews used to say: the air of Barcelona, it makes you wise. »

The Catalonian Jewish community of Salonica was totally annihilated in the Holocaust. The few survivors emigrated to Israel after the war between the years 1945 and 1947.

=== Settlement in the central Maghreb ===
The coasts of Catalonia, Valencia and Mallorca are in front of the coast of the central Maghreb. These lands long maintained commercial relations; also, the Jewish communities maintained close ties. After the riots of 1391, a large group of Catalonian Jews fled to the coasts of the central Maghreb. We know that most of the Jews of Barcelona fled and settled in the city of Algiers. At that time, three kingdoms were established in the Maghreb after the fall of the Almohad, one in the area of present-day Morocco, another in Tunisia and a third in Algeria, which was ruled by the dynasty of Beni-Ziyan from the ancient capital of Tlemcen. In general, the Jews of Castile went to Morocco, while the Jews of Catalonia, Valencia, Mallorca and Aragon went to peesent-day Algeria and Tunisia.

==== The Jews of Algiers ====
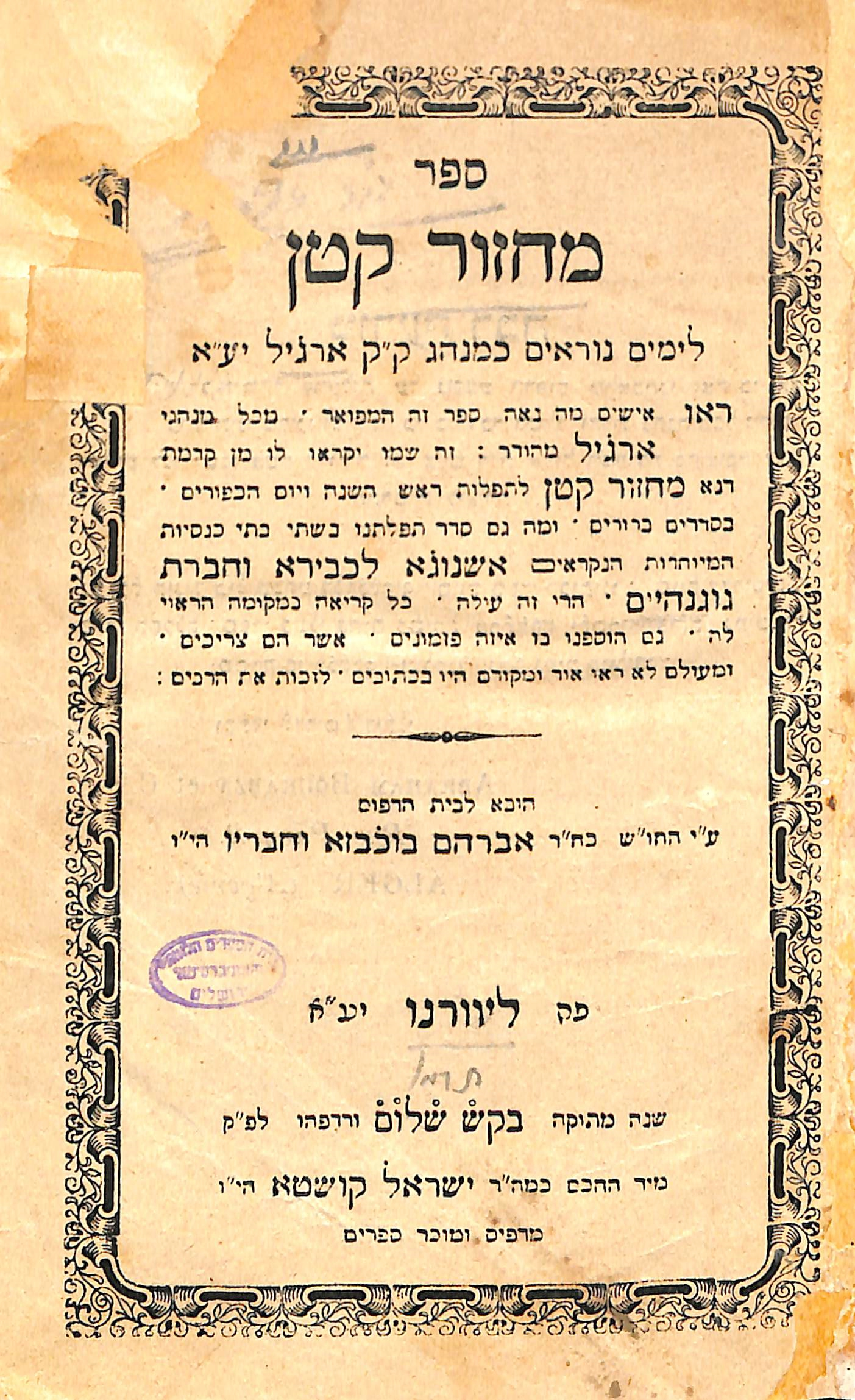
Machzor Qatan, according to the custom of the Holy communities of Algiers, Livorno, 1886.

The Muslim rulers of the central Maghreb received the Jewish exiles with open arms. As soon as the Christian authorities saw that Jews and converts fled to the Maghreb, they forbade them from leaving the country, increased their persecution and flight became more difficult. The Jews who settled in the central Maghreb received the status of dhimmis, as is usual in Islamic countries in exchange for paying taxes. The situation of Jews in the central Maghreb before the arrival of the exiles was very poor, both their economic situation and the level of Torah studies. Peninsular refugees contributed to raising the country's economy thanks to commercial activities with European lands and also improved the level of Torah studies.

Two of the great later Rishonim, Rabbi Yitzhaq bar Sheshet Perfet (Ribash) and Rabbi Shimon ben Tzemacḥ Duran (Rashbatz) fled to the Maghreb. Ribash had long been the grand Rabbi of Catalonia, and Rashbatz, despite his great preparation and knowledge of the Torah, had been dedicated to the medical profession. After a while, Ribash was named Mara de-Atra (maximum rabbinical authority) and head of the Rabbinic Court of the Algiers community, and Rashbatz was appointed Dayan (judge) to his court. When Ribash died, Rashbatz occupied his place. The Jews of the central Maghreb accepted the authority of these two great Rabbis, who were followed by the descendants of Rashbatz, his son Rabbi Shelomo ben Shimon (Rashbash) and his disciples. Throughout the generations, the Jews of the central Maghreb have faithfully and meticulously maintained the spiritual legacy and customs that came from Catalonia. Until today, Ribash, Rashbatz and Rashbash are considered the main Rabbis of Algiers.

One of the characteristics of the manner of dictating halakhah by the Rabbis of Algiers throughout generations has been respect for customs and traditions; the established custom has always trumped halakha, and this is a characteristic that was inherited from Bet Midrash of the Ramban. Matters of halakha in Algiers have always been dictated following the school of Ribash, Rashbatz and Rashbash, and not according to the opinions of Maran ha-Bet Yosef (Yosef Caro, and his work the Shulchan Arukh). In fact, the Jews of Algiers followed the halakhic dictation inherited from the Catalan Bet Midrash of the Ramban and the Rashba. Thus, for example, Rabbi Avraham ibn Taua (1510-1580), grandson of Rashbatz, responded to a question asked by the Rabbis of Fez on a matter referring to the laws of Shabbat:

«Answer: Dear Rabbis, God guard you; know that we are [descendants of] the expelled from the land of Catalonia, and according to what our parents of blessed memory used in those lands, we also used in these places where we have dispersed because of our sins. You know that the Rabbis of Catalonia, according to the dictates on which all the customs of our community are based, are Ramban, Rashba, Reah and Ran, of blessed memory, and other great Rabbis who accompanied them in their generation, although their opinions were not published. Therefore, you do not have to question the customs of our community, since as long as you cannot find any of the issues explicitly mentioned in the books, it should be assumed that they followed the custom according to these great Rabbis. »

Also, regarding the order of prayers and piyyutim, the Jews of Algiers were strictly conservative with the customs that came from Catalonia. Machzor minhag Algiers, for example, arrived from Catalonia around 1391.

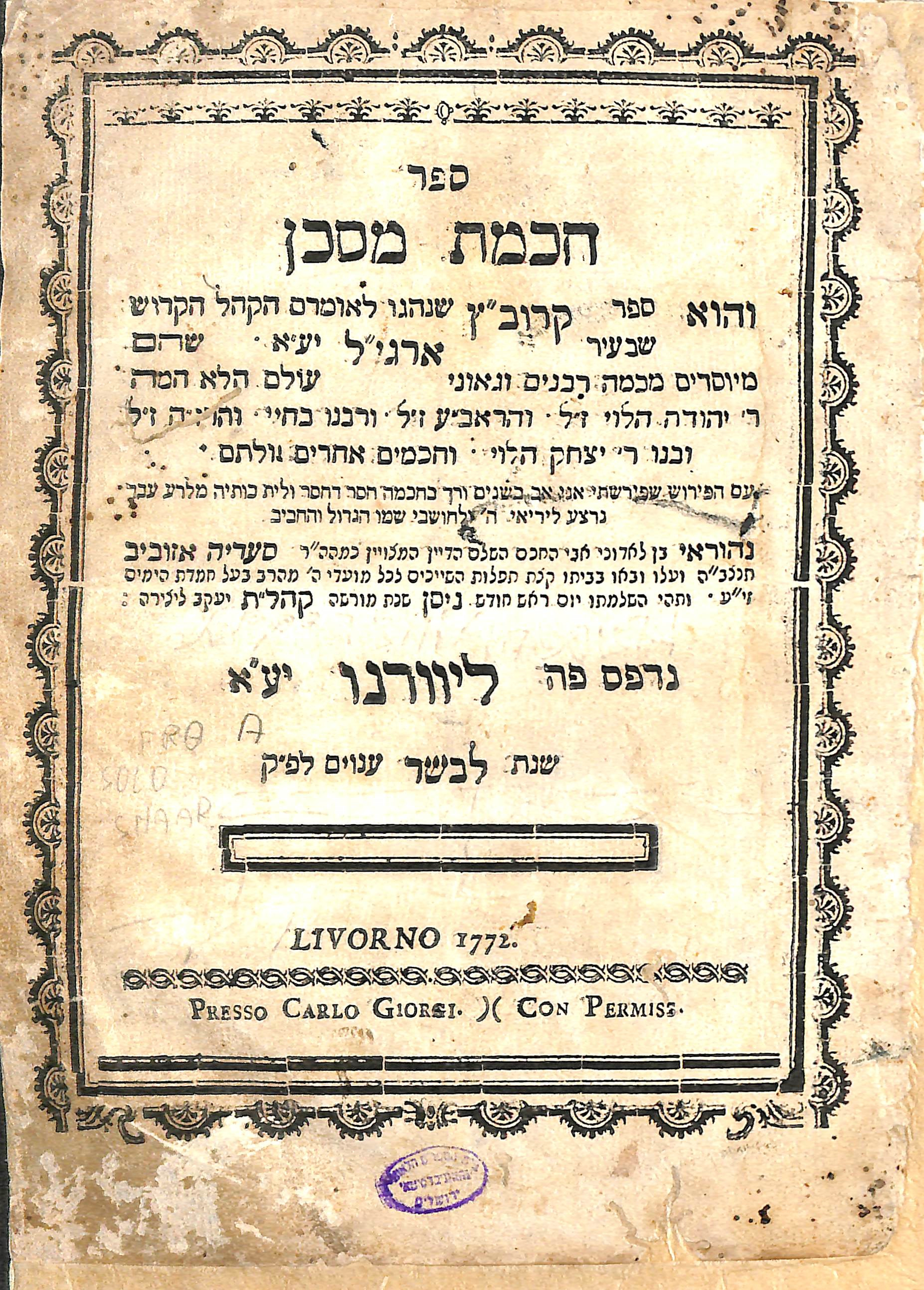
Chokhmat Misken: ve-hu sefer Qrovats, Livorno, 1772.

In the eighteenth century, scholars questioned some of the ancient customs saying that they contradicted the dictates of Rabbi Yitzchaq Luria Ashkenazi (Arizal) (1534-1572). The old custom that came from Catalonia consisted of reciting piyyutim (and also prayers and supplications) in the middle of prayer. They argued that the custom of the city had to be changed. So, they began to change the nusach of the prayers that had been in force in Algiers since ancient times. The Algerian Rabbis opposed this development, arguing that the old custom could not be changed, but in the following generations, most synagogues in the city of Algiers did change the rite of prayer and adopted the custom of the Arizal (known as the custom of the Kabbalists, minhag ha-mequbalim). Only two synagogues maintained the ancient custom (known as the custom of literalists, minhag ha-pashtamim): The Great Synagogue and the synagogue Yakhin u-Boaz (later renamed Guggenheim Society).

The piyyutim mentioned above, which are recited on special Shabbatot and festivals, etc., were edited in a book called Qrovatz. The Jews from Algiers have maintained the texts and melodies that arrived in Algiers during the period of the Ribash and the Rashbatz until the present day. According to the tradition, these are the original melodies that arrived from Catalonia with the two great Rabbis.

In 2000, the annual Ethnomusicology Workshop was held, which focused on the customs and liturgical tradition of the Jews of Algeria. Algerian cantors from France and Israel attended. The workshop was recorded and today the recordings can be listened to on the website of the National Library of Israel. The liturgy of Shabbat, Rosh Chodesh, Yamim Noraim, festivals, fasts and piyyutim for various celebrations were recorded. Although more than 600 years have elapsed, and there have been certain alterations, we can affirm that the uniqueness of the liturgical tradition of the Jews of Algiers largely preserves the medieval tradition of liturgical songs of the Jews of Catalonia.

== Bibliography ==
- Yitzhak Baer, A history of the Jews in Christian Spain, Philadelphia : Jewish Publication Society of America, 1961–1966.
- Jean Régné, History of the Jews in Aragon: regesta and documents, 1213-1327 Jerusalem: 1978.
- Yom Tov Assis, The Golden Age of Aragonese Jewry. Community and society in the Crown of Aragon, 1213-1327, London: 1997.
- Ariel Toaff, «The jewish communities of Catalonia, Aragon and Castile in 16th century Rome», Ariel Toaff, Simon Schwarzfuchs (eds.), The Mediterranean and the Jews. Banking, Finance and International Trade (XVI-XVIII centuries), Ramat Gan: Bar-Ilan University Press, 1989, pp. 259–270.
- Eduard Feliu, «La trama i l'ordit de la historia dels jueus a la Catalunya medieval», I Congrés per a l'estudi dels jueus en territori de llengua catalana. Barcelona: 2001, pp. 9–29.
- Jewish Catalonia: Catalog of the exhibition held in Girona at the Museu d'Història de Catalunya, 2002.; Includes bibliographical references.
- Simon Schwarzfuchs, «La Catalogne et l'invention de Sefarad», Actes del I Congrés per a l'estudi dels jueus en territori de llengua catalana: Barcelona-Girona, del 15 al 17 d'octubre de 2001, Barcelona: Publicacions i Edicions de la Universitat de Barcelona, 2004, pp. 185-208.
- A history of Jewish Catalonia : the life and death of Jewish communities in Medieval Catalonia / Sílvia Planas, Manuel Forcano; photography, Josep M. Oliveras. 2009, Includes bibliographical references.
- Manuel Forcano, Els jueus catalans: la historia que mai no t'han explicat, Barcelona: Angle Editorial, 2014.
