= Vidal Taroç =

Catalan Jewish landowner and court Jew

Vidal Taroç (Hebrew: וידל בן טודרוס טארוש) was a Catalan Jewish landowner and court Jew.

== Biography ==
Born in Barcelona, Catalonia, around 1265. His father Todros Taroç II was a wealthy Gironan merchant, and paternal grandson of Azriel of Girona. Vidal briefly lived in Vic from 1288-1301, where he was a successful landowner, in 1289 he rented houses and orchids in Montcada and later made a large sum of money renting out the properties to Jewish members of the community. Using the large wealth he amassed, Vidal was able to establish the Taroç family as one of the leading Jewish families of Catalonia. Vidal later moved to Manresa in 1301, where he possibly served as a representative of Catalan Jewry in certain municipal courts, later retiring to his ancestral hometown of Girona. He had one son Isaac Taroç, the father of Vidal Taroç II and Salomo Abraham Taroç.
