= Judah ben Yakar =

Kabbalist, teacher of Nachmanides

Judah ben Yakar (d. between 1201 and 1218) was a rabbi and talmudist.

Born in Provence, he later studied under Isaac ben Abraham of Dampierre in northern France. Surviving documents place him in Barcelona in 1175, and establish that he died between 1201 and 1218.

He was the teacher of Nahmanides (Ramban), and through him Nahmanides learned the scholarship of the Tosafists. He is quoted frequently in the works of Nahmanides, and occasionally in those of Shlomo ibn Aderet (Rashba), Yom Tov Asevilli (Ritva), and others. He was known as "a great storehouse of the two Talmuds". He wrote a commentary on the Jerusalem Talmud - apparently the first such commentary - which is no longer extant. According to some, he also wrote a commentary to the Babylonian Talmud, but this too is lost. He wrote a commentary on the prayer liturgy, known as Maayan Ganim, which was often quoted by later rishonim, particularly David Abudirham.

According to Gershon Scholem and Moshe Idel he was one of the earliest kabbalists, but Haviva Pedaya disagreed.

ר״י הבחור

רבי יצחק סגי נהור
יהודה בר יקר
רמב״ן

Teachers
Students
