= Girona Synagogue =

Former synagogue and now museum in Girona, Spain

- Hebrew: הבית כנסת של גירונא; Catalan: Sinagoga de Girona
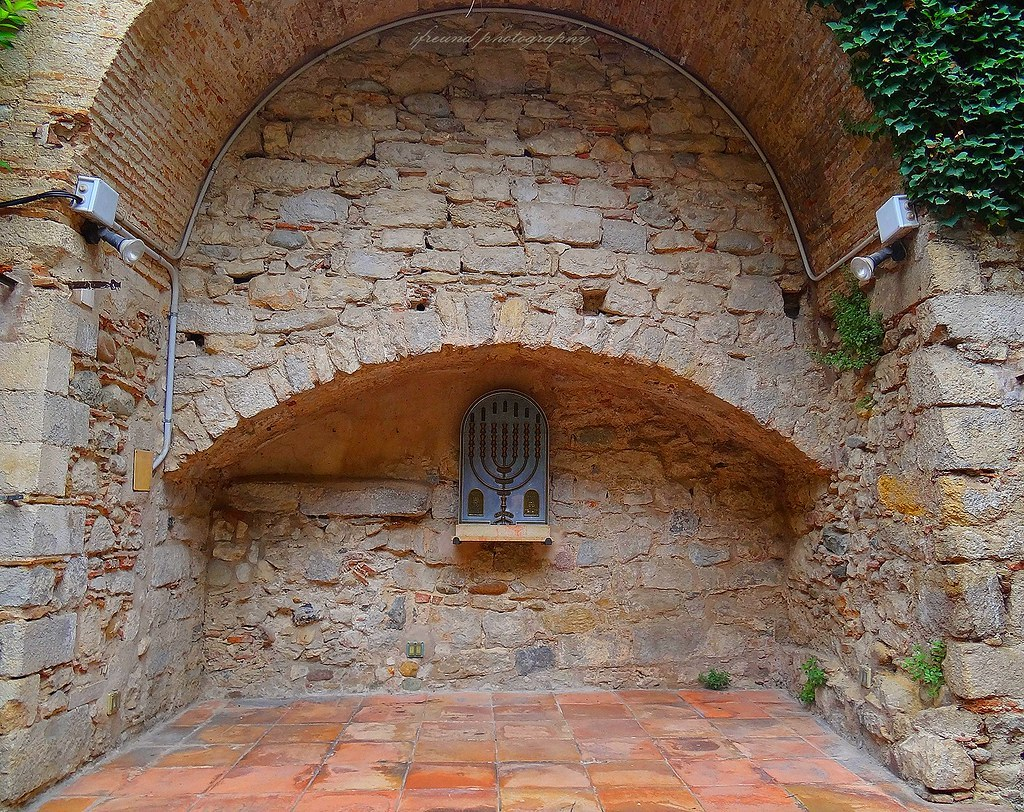
- Wall of the former synagogue, in 2020

- Location of the former synagogue, now museum, in Catalonia

Religion
- Affiliation: Judaism (former)
- Rite: Nusach Sefard
- Ecclesiastical or organisational status: Synagogue (13th century–1492); Private residence (1492–1980s); Jewish museum (since 1980s)
- Status: Abandoned (as a synagogue); Repurposed

Location
- Location: Carrer de Sant Llorenç, Girona, Catalonia
- Country: Spain
- Coordinates: 41°59′09″N 2°49′31″E

Architecture
- Type: Synagogue architecture
- Funded by: Taroç family (14th century)
- Completed: 13th century
- Materials: Stone

The Girona Synagogue (Hebrew: הבית כנסת של גירונא; Catalan: Sinagoga de Girona) is a former Jewish congregation and synagogue, located in Carrer de Sant Llorenç, (Note: Renamed from Carrer de la Força in 1492.) Girona, in Catalonia, Spain. No longer in use as a synagogue, the building was initially repurposed as a private residence and, since the 1980s, has been part of the Bonastruc Center and Museum (Catalan: Centre Bonastruc ça Porta), a Jewish museum.

== History ==
The Medieval synagogue served as the centre for early Spanish Kabbalism, with scholars such as Nachmanides, Issac the Blind and Azriel of Girona using the synagogue as a house of learning. The synagogue was built around the 13th century, with large renovations done in the mid-14th century, mostly funded by the Taroç family.

Following the Massacre of 1391, the synagogue was desecrated and looted; however, in 1415, Ferdinand I of Aragon ordered that the synagogue be restored to the Jews. During the Catalan Civil War the synagogue was partly destroyed, and following the Alhambra Decree of 1492, the synagogue was sold to the canons of Girona Cathedral on 10 July 1492 for the price of 300 pounds. Today the site of the synagogue functions as a museum where archaeological finds and documents related to the synagogues of Girona are displayed.

== See also ==
- History of the Jews in Catalonia
- List of synagogues in Spain
