= Wadi al-Joz =

Palestinian neighborhood in East Jerusalem

Coordinates: 31°47′20″N 35°14′16″E

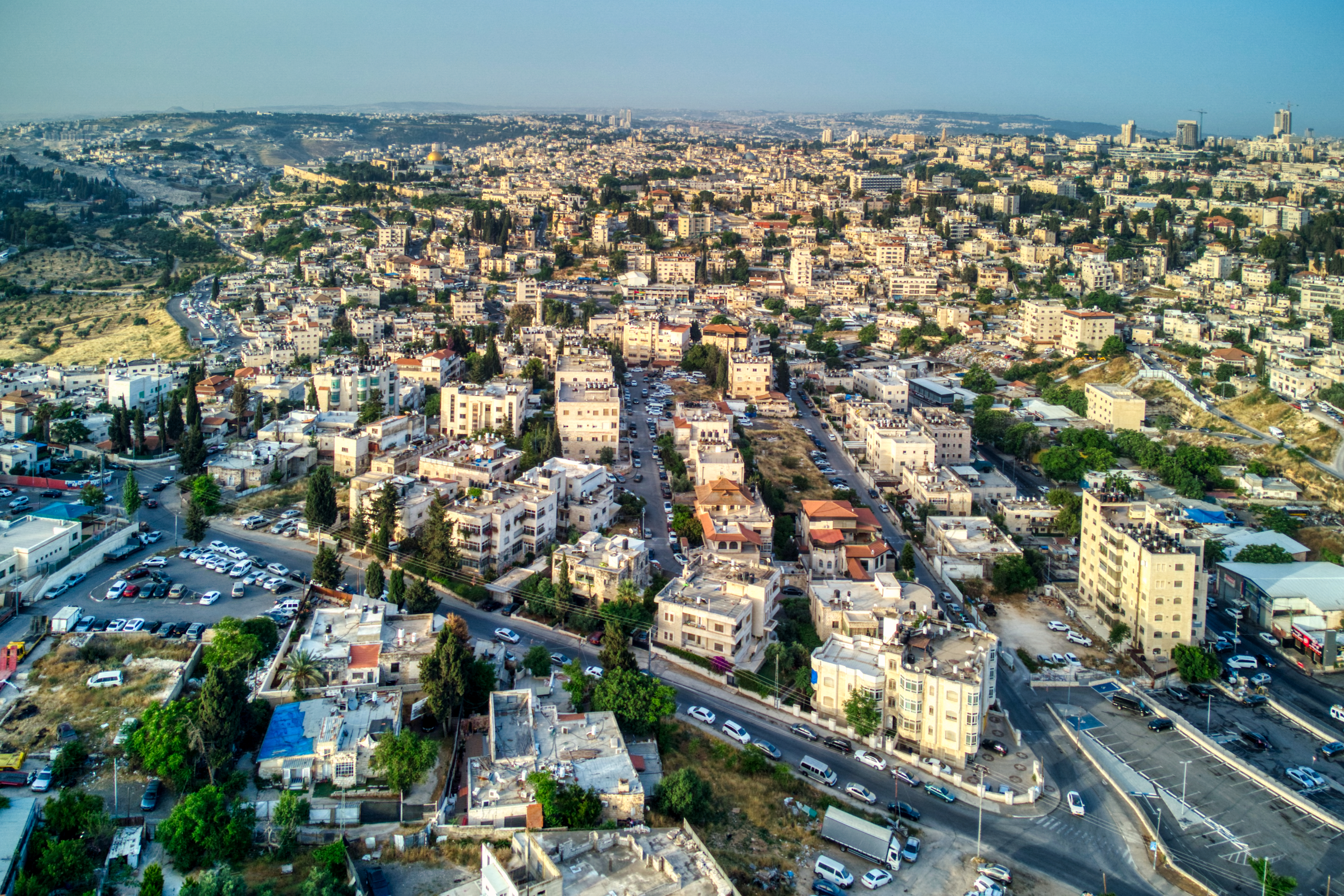
Wadi Joz

Wadi al-Joz (Arabic: وادي الجوز; Hebrew: ואדי אל-ג'וז), also Wadi Joz, is a Palestinian neighborhood in East Jerusalem, located at the head of the Kidron Valley, north of the Old City of Jerusalem. The population of Wadi Joz is 13,000. It is located 750 meters above sea level in the Kidron Valley (Nahal Kidron).

"Wadi al-Joz", in Arabic, literally means "Valley of the Walnuts", though it is believed that the name is an abbreviation of "Valley of Josaphat", a location mentioned in the Bible, traditionally identified with the Kidron Valley.

== History ==
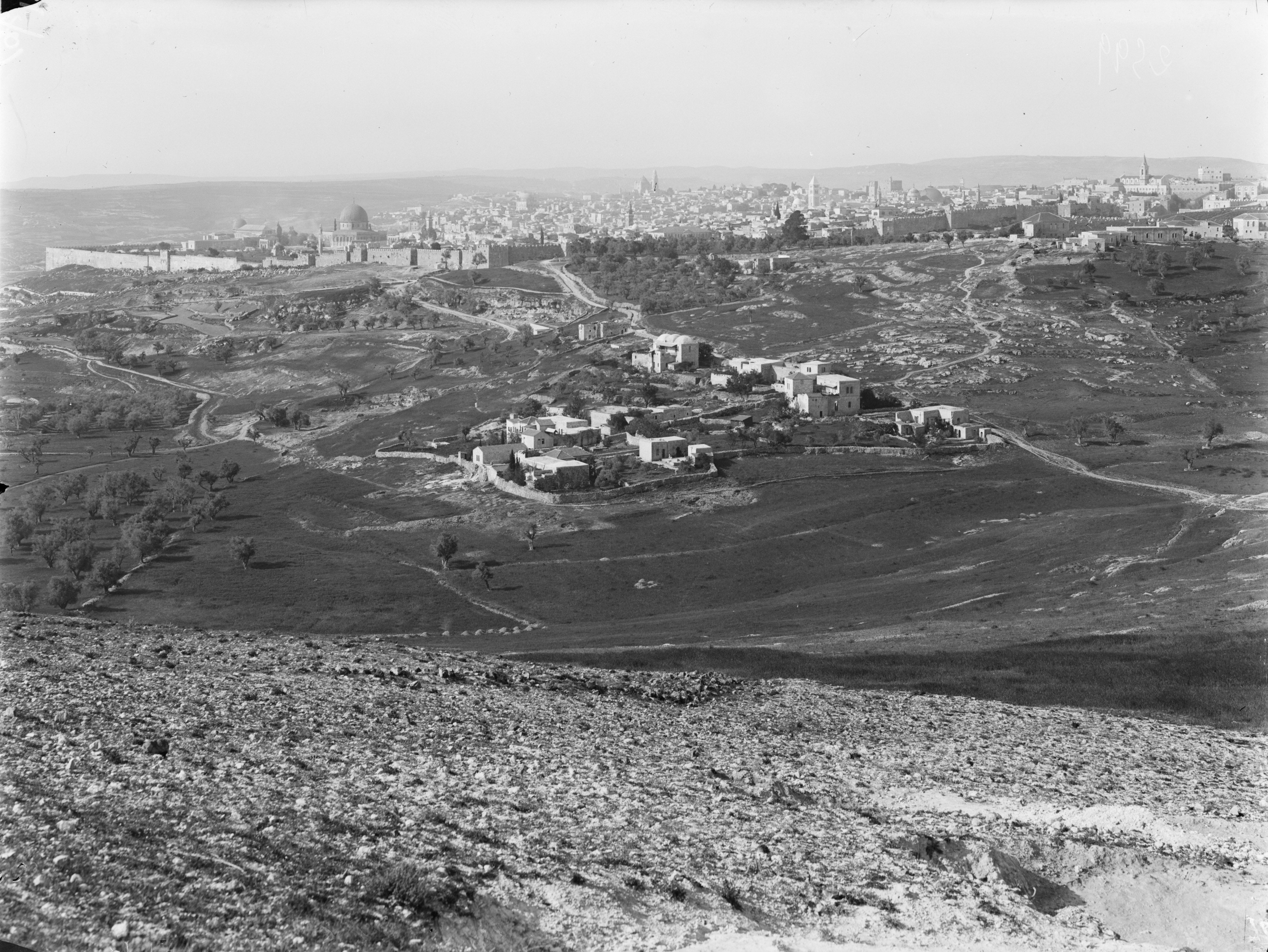
Skyline view of Wadi al-Joz in the foreground with the Old City and Temple Mount of Jerusalem in the background

The neighborhood was established outside Herod's Gate in the late 19th century when wealthy Arab Jerusalemite families built summer houses there. The largest and oldest landowning family of Wadi al-Joz were the Khatib family of Jerusalem, which, according to the family's oral history, settled in Jerusalem in the 14th century. They established agricultural estates, mills and fortified summer residences in Wadi al-Joz but remained based in the Bab al-Hadid neighborhood abutting the Temple Mount until permanently relocating to Wadi al-Joz in 1926. In the first quarter of the 20th century, the Hidmi family built several houses on the slopes of Wadi al-Joz. Members of the family first began settling in the valley in 1870 and employed day laborers from Isawiya and Anata to work their farms. The patriarch of the Hidmi family (originally called the Mu'awwad), entered Palestine in the army of Ibrahim Pasha of Egypt in 1831, lost his governorship of Hebron during the 1834 Peasants' Revolt and thereafter settled permanently in Jerusalem. In the early 1900s, an oil depot and distribution center was established in Wadi al-Joz.

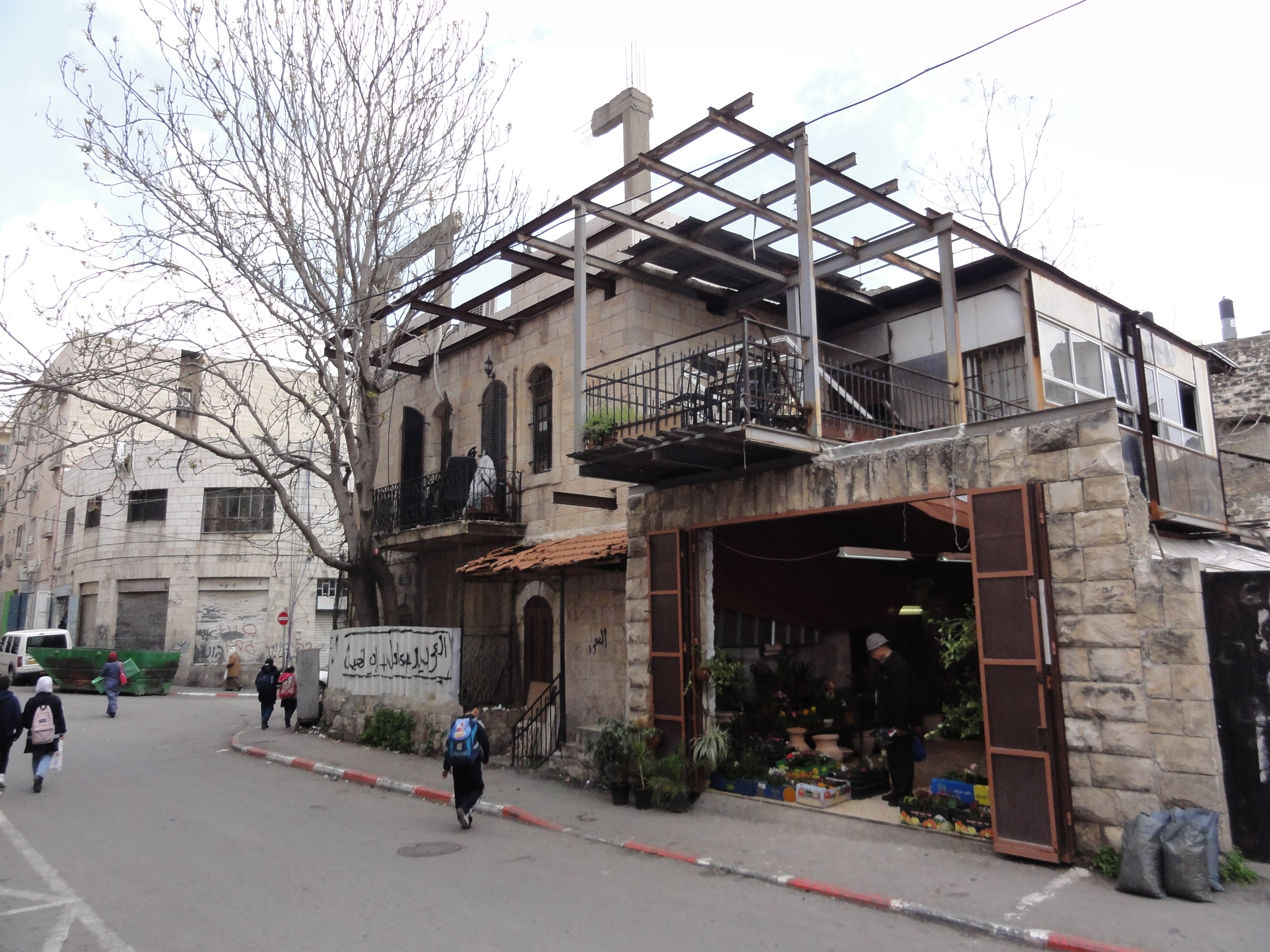
A home in Wadi al-Joz, 2011

Wadi al-Joz developed into its current shape between the 1948 and 1967 Arab–Israeli wars during which the neighborhood became home to refugees from the western neighborhoods of Jerusalem captured by Israel and migrants from West Bank villages owing to its proximity to the Old City and its sparse population. Among the Jerusalemite refugees were residents of Baqa. The bulk of the population influx in Wadi al-Joz is attributed to migration from the villages of the West Bank in the 1950s and 1960s. In the center of Wadi al-Joz the shanty neighborhood of Jabal Abu Jibna was home to 350 residents, as of the 1990s, mainly from the vicinity of Sa'ir. The owners of the 44 dunams, which make up the neighborhood are the Abu Jibna family. The Abu Jibna were based in the Bab al-Silsila neighborhood of the Old City, purchased the land in Wadi al-Joz in the late 19th century and today mainly reside in Shuafat.

In 2007, a neighborhood association was formed to push for improvements in local services and infrastructure.

In September 2014, a local resident, Muhammad Abd Al-Majid Sunuqrut, 16, was shot during a protest. According to the teen’s father he was shot in the head with a rubber-coated bullet, reportedly, while walking to a mosque for evening prayers but according to the police he was shot in the leg and then fell injuring his head while throwing stones. His father complained of recent harassment, consisting of the use of skunk spraying, rubber-coated bullets and tear gas, by IDF soldiers.

== Economy ==
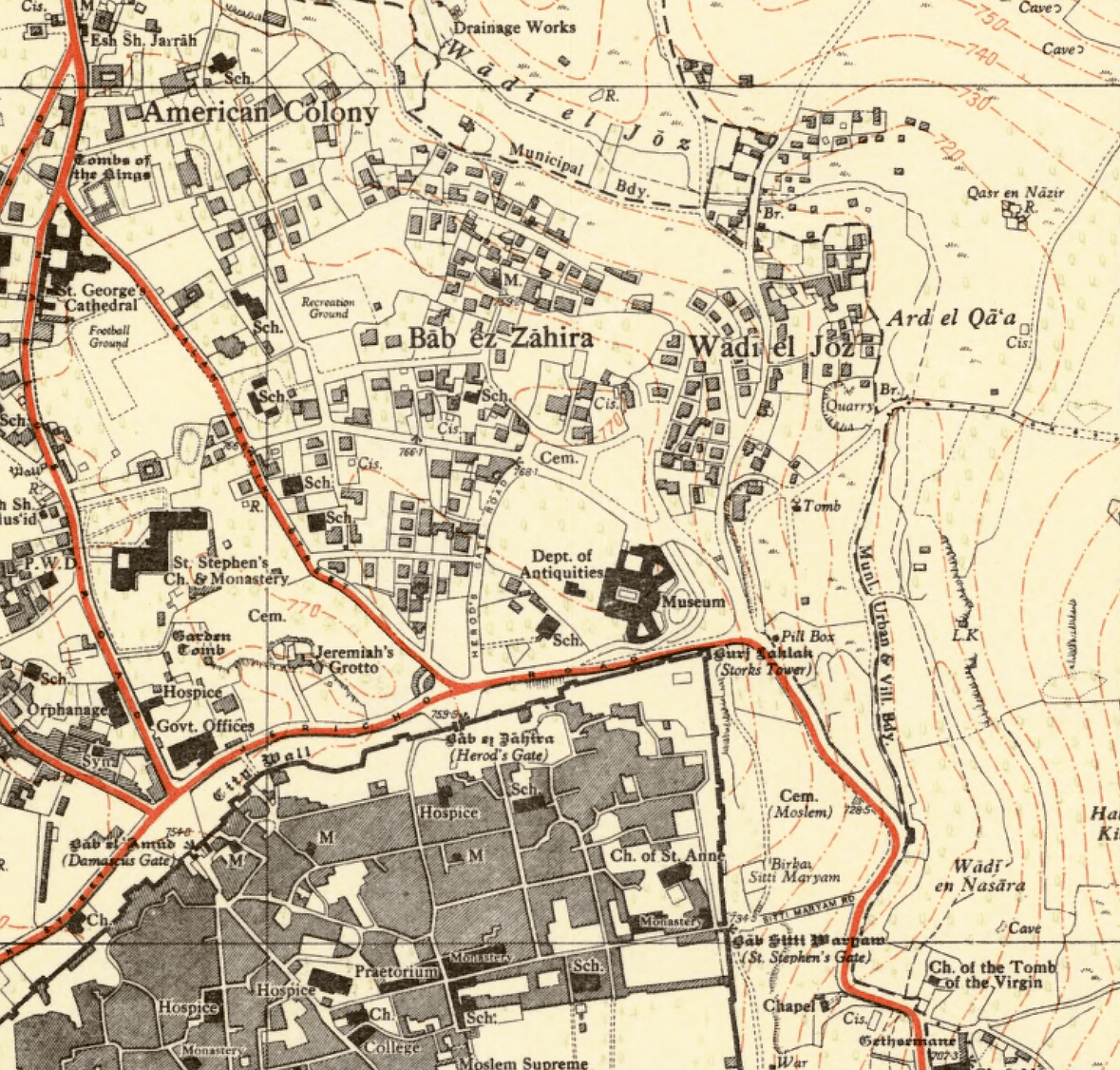
Wadi Al-Joz in 1946

Wadi al-Joz is well known in Jerusalem for its car repair centres, based in an industrial zone created by the last Palestinian mayor of Jerusalem, Rawhi Khatib, who established it on 12 dunams of private waqf land owned by his family.

== Landmarks ==
The neighborhood's main mosque is the Abdeen Mosque built in 1939. Another mosque is the Hejazi Mosque built later in the 20th century.

The Cave of the Ramban, located in 'Uthman Ibn 'Afan Street, is considered by some Jews to be the burial place of Nahmanides.

== Notable people ==
- Faisal Husseini

== Bibliography ==
- Habash, Dalia (Spring 1998). "Wadi al-Joz: In Focus". Jerusalem Quarterly. 1: 43–50. doi:10.70190/jq.I1.p43.
- Ma'oz, Moshe and Nusseibeh, Sari. (2000). Jerusalem: Points of Friction, and Beyond BRILL. ISBN 90-411-8843-6.
- Palmer, E. H. (1881). The Survey of Western Palestine: Arabic and English Name Lists Collected During the Survey by Lieutenants Conder and Kitchener, R. E. Transliterated and Explained by E.H. Palmer. Committee of the Palestine Exploration Fund.
- Schick, Conrad (1892). "Letters from Baurath C. Schick / Remarkable Rock cut tomb in Wady el Joz". Quarterly Statement - Palestine Exploration Fund. 24: 9-16.
