= Aaron of Cardena =

Spanish cabalist

Aaron of Cardena (Hebrew: אהרן קרדינה) was allegedly a Spanish cabalist who wrote a book containing "profound secrets" under the title of Ḳarnayim ("Rays"—see Habbakuk 3:4).

Little is known about his life and Gershom Scholem assumes that he never existed. Aaron Kardina (in Scholem's work) is said to have served as a fictional editor.

== Ḳarnayim ==
The work Ḳarnayim was first published at Żółkiew, in 1709, together with a commentary, Dan Yadin, by Rabbi Samson ben Pesah Ostropoli, and additions by his nephew, under the title of Liḳḳuṭe Shoshanim. In 1805 it was republished at Zhytomyr together with the commentary Parashat Eliezer, by Eliezer Fishel, grandson of Rabbi Isaac of Kraków, and in 1835 it was again published at Leghorn together with the commentary Ḳeren Ẓebi and another work, Peraḥ Shoshan, by Samuel ben Joseph Shamama. According to Gershom Scholem, Ḳarnayim was authored by Rabbi Samson ben Pesah Ostropoli himself.

Ḳarnayim was also erroneously ascribed to Isaac b. Abraham b. David, surnamed "the Blind", which fact shows the esteem in which it was held and also the age in which it was written.

== Other works ==
The author of Ḳarnayim, at the close of chapter 3 and at the beginning of chapters 5 and 7, refers to two of his other works, Kitro Yeshu'ah ("His Crown is Salvation" — compare Psalm 33:16), and Peraḥ Ẓiẓ ("The Blossom of the Priestly Diadem" — compare Numbers 17:23), the titles of which seem to refer to his name, Aaron, as priest.
