= Salomo Abraham Taroç =

Sephardic Jewish physician and money lender

Salomo Abraham Taroç (Hebrew: שלמה אברהם בן יצחק טארוש) was a 14th century Sephardic Jewish physician and money lender.

== Biography ==
He was born in early 1301 in Girona, Catalonia. His father, Isaac Taroç, was a wealthy landowner and representative of Gironan Jewry, as well as the son of Vidal Taroç. During his early years, Salomo studied medicine in Vic, later returning to Girona, where he married Dolca Bonjuà, a member of the prominent Bonjuà family of bailiffs and court officials. Her father Maimó ibn Mahir Bonjuà, was a wealthy judge in Vic, with ancestral ties to Girona. The couple subsequently moved to Barcelona, where Salomo amassed great wealth through property rental and money lending to Christian aristocrats, becoming one of the wealthiest Jews in Girona. Around this time, Salomo also established himself as a leading physician in Girona, possibly even serving as a physician for members of the Crown of Aragon. Salomo moved again to Verges, where he likely passed away around 1380. He had two sons, Abraham David Taroç and Isaac Baro Taroç.

== See also ==
- Taroç family
