= Cave of the Ramban =

Archaeological site in Wadi al-Joz, Israel

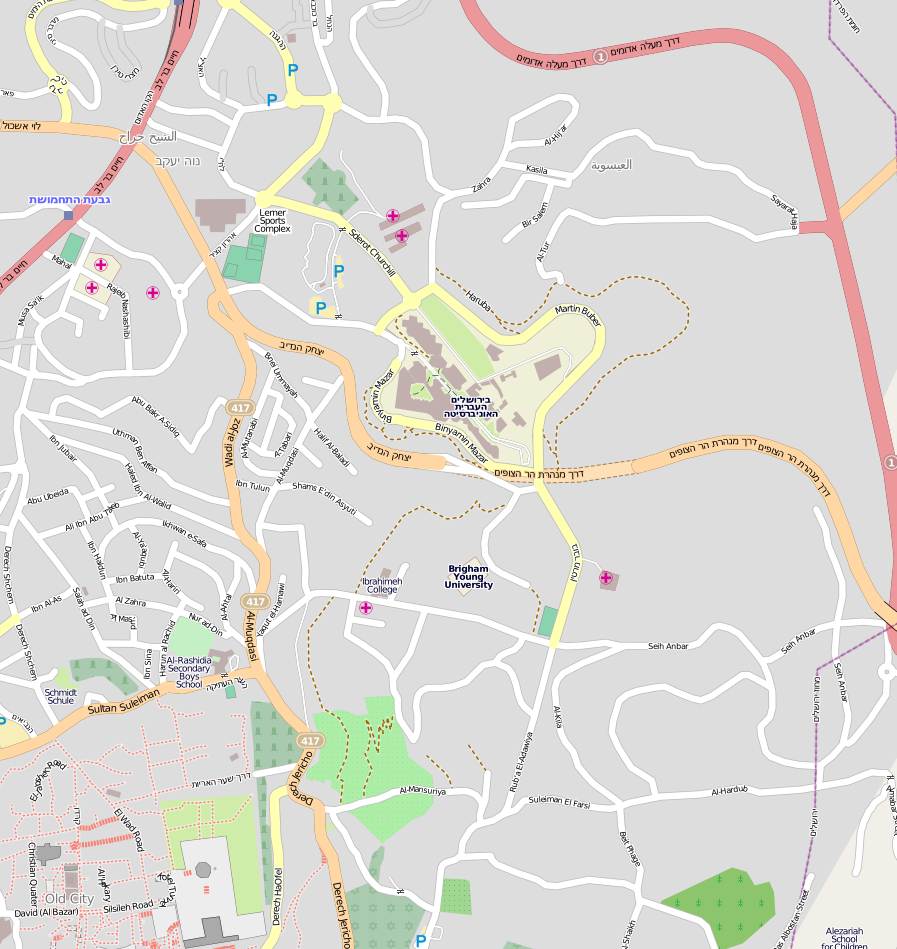
- Location within East Central Jerusalem Location within Jerusalem
- 31.789233°N 35.233817°E
- Type: burial chamber
- Location: 'Uthman Ibn 'Afan Street; Wadi al-Joz, East Jerusalem

Site notes
- Height: 3.5 m (11 ft)
- Length: 19 m (62 ft)
- Width: 20 m (66 ft)
- Owner: Jerusalem Islamic Waqf
- Public access: Limited

The Cave of the Ramban is located in the southern cliff of the Upper Kidron Valley, on a slope descending into the Arab neighborhood of Wadi al-Joz, Jerusalem. It is believed by some to be the traditional burial place of Nahmanides (also known as Ramban), a foremost rabbinical scholar during the medieval era.

== Burial chamber ==
The large rock-hewn cave, measuring 19 by 20 m, reaches a height of 3.5 meters and is supported by two columns. The area once functioned as an ancient underground stone quarry. Above the façade, in the upper portion of the cliff, are the remains of a square rock-cut chamber which may have been used for burials.

== Significance ==
The cave is believed by some Jews to be the site where Ramban prayed in the 13th-century and the place of his interment. It is thus claimed to have been a holy site for Jews for many centuries. Other traditions hold that Ramban was buried in Silwan, in Hebron or in Acre.

== Recent history ==
In 2000, the cave became a subject of controversy between a group of Jewish inhabitants in Wadi al-Joz and the Muslim owner of the site, who had fenced off the cave in protest to Jewish settlement in the area. The National Authority for Holy Sites convinced the Ministry of Religious Affairs of its religious significance and the cave was declared a holy site and handed over to the ministry’s control. The Muslim wakf subsequently petitioned the High Court of Justice which resulted in a temporary injunction freezing the site's designation. In 2003, a government committee was appointed to examine the issue. While acknowledging the site's connection to the Jewish faith, it was decided that the court could rule on the matter. This however was thwarted when the holy status was reinstated by a government minister. The wakf persisted in its battle for control of the site in the courts and in 2008 it was decided that the cave be placed under the wakfs authority and Jews were banned from entering.

== See also ==
- Ramban Synagogue

== Sources ==
- Nadavi Shragai, Ramban Cave Made Place of Worship, Haaretz. (May 23, 2000)
