= Abraham David Taroç =

14th-century Sephardic Jewish jeweller and aristocrat

Abraham David Taroç (Hebrew: אברהם דוד בן שלמה אברהם טארוש, Avraham David ben Shlomo Avraham Tarosh) (Arabic: إبراهيم داود بن سلومو إبراهيم, التاراس, Ibrahim Dawud bin Salumu Ibrahim al-Taras; died 1392) also known as Abraham Toros was a 14th-century Sephardic Jewish jeweller and aristocrat, who is known for legally being married to two women at the same time in the Catholic Principality of Catalonia.

== Biography ==
Born around 1350 in Barcelona, Catalonia, to the Taroç family. His father, Salomo Abraham Taroç was a physician and a prominent money lender originally from Girona. His mother, Dolca Bonjuà, was the scion of the wealthy Bonjuà family of judges and court officials. In his mid-twenties, he became a very prominent pearlsmith in Barcelona and was one of several highly trained Jewish jewellers who made collections for Queen Eleanor of Aragón. It was his connection to the Queen and later the King which established Abraham as a prominent Jew of Catalonia. Later in his life, like his father, he began to loan large sums of money to Christian aristocrats in Peratallada, Catalonia. It was around this time that he married a woman named Bonadona around 1370. On 24 January 1376, Abraham appeared before Berenquer Morey, the municipal Bailiff of Barcelona, stating that he had a Hebrew document, and requested that said document be interpreted and translated from Hebrew into Catalan by Mosse Bonjuha (his 1st or 2nd cousin), who was a public scribe of the Jewish quarter. Abraham's close friend, Ruben, made a legal statement that Ruben's father, Master Nacim, a leading Jewish optometrist of Barcelona died on 1 January 1376 and left no heirs, thus Abraham petitioned that Reuben be declared heir to the possession. In 1379 Abraham was unprecedentedly granted permission by King John I to make a legal exemption and be able to remarry while remaining married to Bonadona, who, it seems, could not give him children. According to documentation, it was Bondona herself who allowed Abraham to marry a second woman, capable of procreation. Abraham, for his part, pledged to the king to "treat his first wife decently, to care for her, and to provide for her needs with kindness and patience, in accordance with the way a man of his stature should treat a wife". The fact that the King made a legal exemption and defied Christian law in order to grant Abraham this request, demonstrates the lenient and tolerant attitude that was held for Jews by John I of Castile. Abraham had two sons with his second wife, Astruc Taroç and Isaac Taroç III. And he had one son with Bonadona, Joseph Taroç, who converted to Catholicism after Abraham Taroç's death in 1392 and changed his name to "Pere Ballester".
