= Abdeen Mosque =

Mosque in Jerusalem

Coordinates: 31°47′24″N 35°14′8″E

Abdeen Mosque (Arabic: مسجد عابدين) is the main mosque in the Wadi al-Joz neighborhood in East Jerusalem which is predominantly Muslim and mainly of the Sunni tradition, situated some 1,200 meters north of the al‑Aqsa mosque, or the Temple Mount. This small mosque is found where al‑Maqdisi Street meets Ibn Tulun Street. The structure was erected in 1939 by the brothers Abdel Muhsin Abdeen and Omar Abdeen.”
