= Al-Tarās family =

Sephardic Jewish family in Medieval Spain

al-Tarās family عائلة الطراز
- Country: Israel, Turkey and Italy
- Etymology: al-Tarās which means "embroider" in Arabic.
- Origin: Castile
- Founded: c. 1000
- Founder: Hasdai al-Tarās
- Traditions: Judaism (Sephardic)

The al-Tarās family (Arabic: الطراز) (Hebrew: אלתראס) also called ibn al-Tarās and Altaras is a distinguished Sephardic Jewish family originally from Castile, Spain. Members of the family spread to Italy, Turkey, and the Land of Israel, where they produced several rabbis, scholars, printers and businessmen.

== History ==
The al-Tarās family probably came to Spain in the 8th-century, the family progenitor Hasdai al-Tarās was born around 1000 in Castile. He is the grandfather of Sidi ibn Ibrahim al-Taras and third great grandfather of Azriel ibn Menahem al-Taras, whose son Todros ibn Azriel al-Tarās, founded the Taroç family of Catalonia. The Italian branch of the family became prominent printers with Solomon Altaras supervising the publication of a Sephardi prayer book which appeared in Venice in 1685. His son, David, lived in Venice between 1675 and 1714 and wrote Kelalei ha-Dikduk ("Principles of Grammar") which was printed at the beginning of the Venice edition of the Mikra'ot Gedolot (1675–78). David's son, Solomon Altaras II published books in Venice during the 18th century, among them a prayer book containing the minhag ("custom") of Corfu, entitled Leket ha-Omer (1718). In modern times, the family name belongs to Jakob Altaras, a Croatian-German Holocaust survivor, his daughter the actress Adriana Altaras, and her son the actor Aaron Altaras who appeared in the Netflix series Unorthodox.
