= Eliezer Fischel ben Isaac =

Galician Talmudist (c. 1739 - c. 1811)

Eliezer Fischel ben Isaac (Hebrew: אליעזר פישל בן יצחק משטריזוב; c. 1739 – c. 1811) was a Galician Talmudist and kabbalist active in the late 18th and early 19th centuries. He was born and lived in Strizhov, and was associated with the circle of kabbalists at the Klaus of Brody.

Eliezer Fischel devoted four works to expounding the principles of Lurianic doctrine. Despite his involvement in kabbalistic scholarship, he was a noted opponent of Ḥasidism, and several of his books include criticism of Ḥasidic practices.

== Works ==
- ʿOlam ha-Gadol (Midrash li-Ferushim). Zolkiev. 1800. Seventy kabbalistic homilies on Genesis 33:18; thirty on the spheres and lights, forty on Jewish holidays.
- ʿOlam Hafukh. Zolkiev. c. 1800. Exposition on contrasts.
- ʿOlam Barur. Lemberg. c. 1800. Kabbalistic homilies.
- ʿOlam Eḥad. Zolkiev. 1802. Homilies on the unity of God.
- ʿOlam va-'Ed. 1849. On the calculation of the seasons and new moons.

According to bibliographers Fürst and Benjacob, he is also credited with Parashat Eliezer (Zhitomir, 1805), a commentary on Ḳarnayim, the kabbalistic work of Aaron ben Abraham, and on Dan Yadin, the commentary by Samson of Ostropoli.
