= Nachmanides =

13th century Sephardic rabbi and scholar

Nachmanides Moses ben Nahman
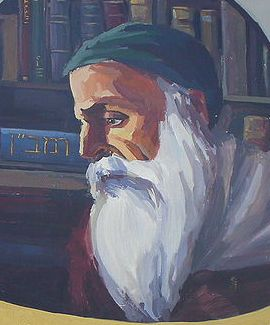
- 21st-century artistic depiction of Nachmanides in Acre
- Born: 1194; Girona, Crown of Aragon (present-day Spain)
- Died: 1270 (aged 75–76); Acre, Kingdom of Jerusalem

Philosophical work
- Era: Medieval philosophy
- Region: Jewish philosophy
- Main interests: Religious law

Moses ben Nachman (Hebrew: מֹשֶׁה בֶּן־נָחְמָן Mōše ben-Nāḥmān, "Moses, son of Nachman"; 1194–1270), commonly known as Nachmanides (/nækˈmænɪdiːz/; Greek: Ναχμανίδης Nakhmanídēs), and also referred to by the acronym Ramban (/ˌrɑːmˈbɑːn/; רמב״ן) and by the contemporary nickname Bonastruc ça Porta (Catalan: [ˌbɔnəsˈtɾuk sə ˈpɔrtə]; literally "Mazel Tov near the Gate", see astruc), was a leading medieval Jewish scholar, Spanish rabbi, philosopher, physician, kabbalist, and biblical commentator. He was raised, studied, and lived for most of his life in Girona, Catalonia. He is also considered to be an important figure in the re-establishment of the Jewish community in Jerusalem following its destruction by the Crusaders in 1099.

== Name ==
"Nachmanides" (Ναχμανίδης) is a Greek-influenced formation meaning "son of Nahman." He is also commonly known by the Hebrew acronym רמב״ן (Ra-M-Ba-N, for Rabbeinu Mōšeh bēn-Nāḥmān, "Our Rabbi Moses son of Nahman"). His Catalan name was Bonastruc ça Porta (also written Saporta or de Porta), literally "Mazel Tov near the Gate."

== Biography ==
Nachmanides was born in Girona in 1194, where he grew up and studied (hence he is also called Mosheh ben Nahman Gerondi, or "Moses son of Nahman the Gironan"), and died in the Land of Israel about 1270. He was a descendant of Isaac ben Reuben of Barcelona and cousin of Jonah Gerondi (Rabbeinu Yonah). Among his teachers in Talmud were Judah ben Yakar and Nathan ben Meïr of Trinquetaille, and he is said to have been instructed in Kabbalah (Jewish mysticism) by his countryman Azriel of Gerona, who was in turn a disciple of Isaac the Blind.

Judah ben Yakar

Natan ben Meir
Nachmanides
Shlomo ibn Aderet

Azriel of Gerona

According to the responsa of Shlomo ibn Aderet Nachmanides studied medicine. During his teens he began to get a reputation as a learned Jewish scholar. At age 16, he began his writings on Jewish law. In his Milhamot Hashem (Wars of the Lord) he defended Alfasi's decisions against the criticisms of Zerachiah ha-Levi of Girona. These writings reveal a conservative tendency that distinguished his later works — an unbounded respect for the earlier authorities.

In the view of Nachmanides, the wisdom of the rabbis of the Mishnah and Talmud, as well as the Geonim (rabbis of the early medieval era) was unquestionable. Their words were to be neither doubted nor criticized. "We bow," he says, "before them, and even when the reason for their words is not quite evident to us, we submit to them" (Aseifat Zekkenim, commentary on Ketubot). Nachmanides' adherence to the words of the earlier authorities may be due to piety, or the influence of the northern French Jewish school of thought. However, it is thought that it also may be a reaction to the rapid acceptance of Greco-Arabic philosophy among the Jews of Spain and Provence; this occurred soon after the appearance of Maimonides' Guide for the Perplexed. This work gave rise to a tendency to allegorize Biblical narratives, and to downplay the role of miracles. Against this tendency Nachmanides strove, and went to the other extreme, not even allowing the utterances of the immediate disciples of the Geonim to be questioned.

== Attitude toward Maimonides ==
Called upon, about 1238, for support by Solomon ben Abraham of Montpellier, who had been excommunicated by supporters of Maimonides, Nachmanides addressed a letter to the communities of Aragon, Navarre, and Castile, in which Solomon's adversaries were severely rebuked. However, the great respect he professed for Maimonides (though he did not share the latter's views), reinforced by innate gentleness of character, kept him from allying himself with the anti-Maimonist party and led him to assume the role of a conciliator. Maimonides was 58 years old when Nachmanides was born.

In a letter addressed to the French rabbis, he draws attention to the virtues of Maimonides and holds that Maimonides' Mishneh Torah – his Code of Jewish Law – not only shows no leniency in interpreting prohibitions within Jewish law, but may even be seen as more stringent, which in Nachmanides' eyes was a positive factor. As to Maimonides' Guide for the Perplexed, Nachmanides stated that it was intended not for those of unshaken belief, but for those who had been led astray by the non-Jewish philosophical works of Aristotle and Galen. (Note that Nachmanides's analysis of the Guide is not the consensus view of modern scholars.) "If," he says, "you were of the opinion that it was your duty to denounce the Guide as heretical, why does a portion of your flock recede from the decision as if it regretted the step? Is it right in such important matters to act capriciously, to applaud the one to-day and the other tomorrow?"

To reconcile the two parties, Nachmanides proposed that the ban against the philosophical portion of Maimonides's Code of Jewish law should be revoked, but that the ban against public study of the Guide for the Perplexed, and against those who rejected allegorical interpretation of the Bible, should be maintained and even strengthened.

Due to the existence of three variant editions of Nachmanides' letter, there is some debate as to the contents of his proposed resolution. The Savaral manuscript reads as follows:

Let a royal command issue forth from you as you become a single group and a lasting bond to destroy an upraised arm, to excommunicate, ban, and place under a curse every tongue speaking arrogantly which God will destroy, one who mocks the aggadot or opens his mouth against the asmakhtot, and those who engage in the study of the Guide in groups. For the great rabbi and author Maimonides has commanded not to publicize nor explicate it.

— Cultures in Collision and Conversation: Essays in the Intellectual History of the Jews, p. 122 (2011)

This compromise, which might have ended the struggle, was rejected by both parties in spite of Nachmanides' authority.

== Iggeret ha-Kodesh ==
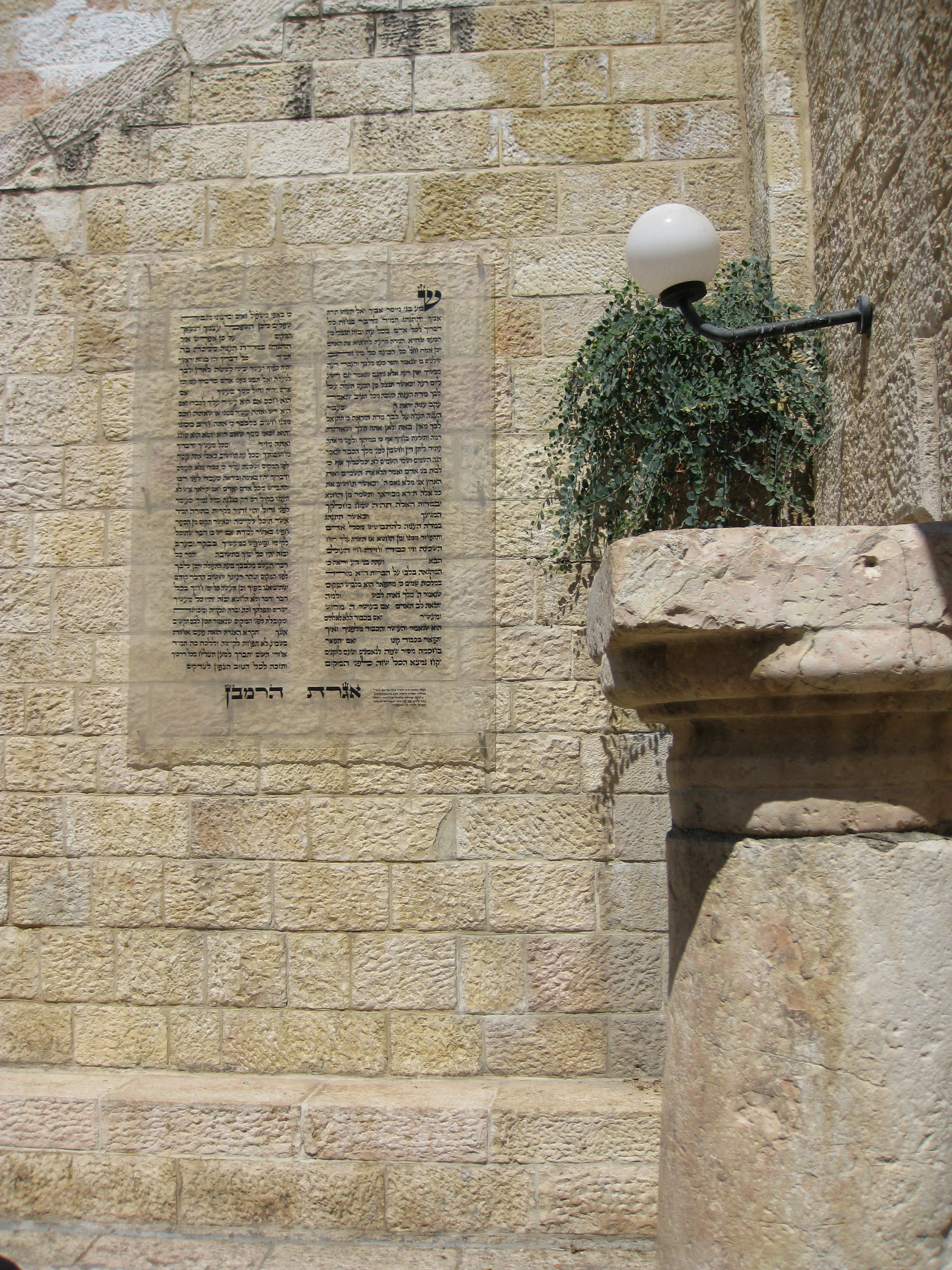
Nachmanides's letter to his son displayed on the Ramban synagogue in Jerusalem

The book Iggeret ha-Kodesh (אגרת הקודש - The Holy Epistle) on the topics of marriage, holiness, and sexual relations was commonly attributed to Nachmanides, who supposedly wrote it for his son as a wedding gift. However, modern scholarship attributes it to a different author, perhaps Rabbi Joseph ben Abraham Gikatilla.

In this book, the author criticizes Maimonides for stigmatizing man's sexual nature as a disgrace to man. In the view of the author, the body with all its functions being the work of God, is holy, and so none of its normal sexual impulses and actions can be regarded as objectionable.

== Views on death, mourning and the resurrection ==
In Nachmanides's Torat ha-Adam, which deals with mourning rites, burial customs, etc., Nachmanides sharply criticizes writers who strove to render man indifferent to both pleasure and pain. This, he declares, is against the Law, which commands man to rejoice on the day of joy and weep on the day of mourning. The last chapter, entitled Shaar ha-Gemul, discusses reward and punishment, resurrection, and kindred subjects. It derides the presumption of the philosophers who pretend to a knowledge of the essence of God and the angels, while even the composition of their own bodies is a mystery to them.

For Nachmanides, divine revelation is the best guide in all these questions, and proceeds to give his commentary on Jewish views of the afterlife. He holds that as God is eminently just, there must be reward and punishment. This reward and punishment must take place in another world, for the good and evil of this world are relative and transitory.

Besides the animal soul, which is derived from the "Supreme powers" and is common to all creatures, man possesses a special soul. This special soul, which is a direct emanation from God, existed before the creation of the world. Through the medium of man it enters the material life; and at the dissolution of its medium it either returns to its original source or enters the body of another man. This belief is, according to Nachmanides, the basis of the levirate marriage, the child of which inherits not only the name of the brother of his fleshly father, but also his soul, and thus continues its existence on the earth. The resurrection spoken of by the prophets, which will take place after the coming of the Messiah, is referred by Nachmanides to the body. The physical body may, through the influence of the soul, transform itself into so pure an essence that it will become eternal.

In this world, the Sages apprehend through the Holy Spirit seven sefirot [. . .] In the Days of the Messiah the eighth sefirah will be apprehended, and they [the Sages] hint to it. In the World to Come, the apprehension will be complete with all ten sefirot, and they allude to them

— "Shaar ha-Gemul", Nachmanides

Nachmanides thinks that at the coming of Messiah the knowledge is deeper and also the Kabbalah may be known with Holy Spirit with ten Sefirot while before this the Holy Spirit could achieve only seven Sefirot. Ten Sefirot include Chokhmah, Binah and Keter also with the seven because thinking with Messiah is very strong and all truth must be really known.

…since we must be closer than they [the Sages] to the End, and perhaps even really close given the long duration of the exile that has already passed, perhaps the decree decreed upon him [Daniel] to conceal it has lapsed, because the underlying reason for it is null, namely, that "it pertains to far-off days" (Dan 8:26). Because he said "many will wander (yeshotetu) and knowledge will increase" (Dan 12:4), it is hinted to us from here that we may contemplate (le-shotet) the End in this book and increase the opinions about it. When he says, "but the enlightened will understand" (Dan 12:10), we learn that when the End approaches, the enlightened will understand these hints

— Nachmanides

Nachmanides gives much importance to the messianic era, especially in relation to the end of the 4 exiles, the last of which is that of Edom identified in Rome. He considers many prophecies of the Tanakh concerning the Messiah and in particular the Book of Daniel: here he considers the exact moment before the messianic revelation while admitting not to be completely aware of what should happen in every detail. It is however evident that divine knowledge will be widely spread and this has always been a topic of debate even among the Jewish wise men (the Chakhamim) following the prophets and the rabbis of the Talmud.

== Commentary on the Torah ==
Nachmanides' commentary on the Torah (five books of Moses) was his last work, and his most well known. He frequently cites and critiques Rashi's commentary, and provides alternative interpretations where he disagrees with Rashi's interpretation. He was prompted to record his commentary by three motives: (1) to satisfy the minds of students of the Law and stimulate their interest by a critical examination of the text; (2) to justify the ways of God and discover the hidden meanings of the words of Scripture, "for in the Torah are hidden every wonder and every mystery, and in her treasures is sealed every beauty of wisdom"; (3) to soothe the minds of the students by simple explanations and pleasant words when they read the appointed sections of the Pentateuch on Sabbaths and festivals. His exposition, intermingled with aggadic and mystical interpretations, is based upon careful philology and original study of the Bible.

His commentary on the creation of the world describes the heavens and the earth being created out of a noncorporeal substance:

Now listen to the correct and clear explanation of the verse in its simplicity. The Holy One, blessed be He, created all things from absolute non-existence. Now we have no expression in the sacred language for bringing forth something from nothing other than the word bara (created). Everything that exists under the sun or above was not made from non-existence at the outset. Instead He brought forth from total and absolute nothing a very thin substance devoid of corporeality but having a power of potency, fit to assume form and to proceed from potentiality into reality. This was the primary matter created by G-d; it is called by the Greeks hyly (matter). After the hyly He did not create anything, but He formed and made --things with it, and from this hyly He brought everything into existence and clothed the forms and put them into a finished condition.

As in his preceding works, he vehemently attacks the Greek philosophers, especially Aristotle, and frequently criticizes Maimonides' biblical interpretations. Thus he assails Maimonides' interpretation of Gen. 18:8, asserting that Maimonides' preferred understanding is contrary to the evident meaning of the Biblical words and that it is sinful even to hear it. While Maimonides endeavored to reduce the miracles of the Bible to the level of natural phenomena, Nachmanides emphasizes them, declaring that "no man can share in the Torah of our teacher Moses unless he believes that all our affairs, whether they concern masses or individuals, are miraculously controlled, and that nothing can be attributed to nature or the order of the world." See further on this debate under Divine Providence. David Berger has argued that Nachmanides did subscribe to the existence of a natural order.

Next to belief in miracles Nachmanides places three other beliefs, which are, according to him, the Jewish principles of faith, namely, the belief in creation out of nothing, in the omniscience of God, and in divine providence.

Nachmanides, in this commentary, often fiercely criticized Rabbi Abraham ibn Ezra, particularly regarding ibn Ezra's negative attitude towards Kabbalah. Nevertheless, he had tremendous respect for ibn Ezra, as is evidenced in his introduction to the commentary.

Over time, Nachmanides updated his commentary in at least 250 places, particularly after moving from Spain to the Land of Israel. These updates are attested to in different versions of his commentary which survived in manuscript.

== Disputation of Barcelona, 1263 ==
Nachmanides, first as rabbi of Girona and later as chief rabbi of Catalonia, seems to have led a largely untroubled life. When well advanced in years, however, his life was interrupted by an event which made him leave his family and his country and wander in foreign lands. This was the religious disputation in which he was called upon to defend his faith in 1263. The debate was initiated by Pablo Christiani, a Jewish convert to Christianity, who had been sent by the Dominican Master General, Raymond de Penyafort, to King James I of Aragon, with the request that the king order Nachmanides to respond to charges against Judaism.

Pablo Christiani had been trying to make the Jews convert to Christianity. Relying upon the reserve his adversary would be forced to exercise due to fear of offending the feelings of the Christians, Pablo assured the King that he would prove the truth of Christianity from the Talmud and other rabbinical writings. Nachmanides answered the order of the King, but asked that complete freedom of speech should be granted. For four days (July 20–24) he debated with Pablo Christiani in the presence of the King, the court, and many churchmen.

The subjects discussed were:

1. whether the Messiah had appeared;
2. whether the Messiah announced by the Prophets was to be considered as divine or as a man born of human parents
3. whether the Jews or the Christians were in possession of the true faith.

Christiani argued, based upon several aggadic passages, that the Pharisee sages believed that the Messiah had lived during the Talmudic period, and that they ostensibly believed that the Messiah was therefore Jesus. Nachmanides countered that Christiani's interpretations were distortions; the rabbis would not hint that Jesus was Messiah while, at the same time, explicitly opposing him as such. He further said that if the sages of the Talmud believed that Jesus was the messiah then most certainly they would have been Christians and not Jews, and the fact that the sages of the Talmud were Jews is beyond dispute. Nachmanides proceeded to provide context for the proof-texts cited by Christiani, showing that they were most clearly understood differently than as proposed by Christiani. Furthermore, Nachmanides demonstrated from numerous biblical and talmudic sources that traditional Jewish belief ran contrary to Christiani's postulates.

Nachmanides argued that the Biblical prophets regarded the future messiah as a human, a person of flesh and blood, and not as divine, in the way that Christians view Jesus. He stated that their promises of a reign of universal peace and justice had not yet been fulfilled, that since the appearance of Jesus, the world had been filled with violence and injustice, and that among all denominations the Christians were the most warlike.

[... it seems most strange that... ] the Creator of Heaven and Earth resorted to the womb of a certain Jewish lady, grew there for nine months and was born as an infant, and afterwards grew up and was betrayed into the hands of his enemies who sentenced him to death and executed him, and that afterwards... he came to life and returned to his original place. The mind of a Jew, or any other person, simply cannot tolerate these assertions. You have listened all your life to the priests who have filled your brain and the marrow of your bones with this doctrine, and it has settled into you because of that accustomed habit. [I would argue that if you were hearing these ideas for the first time, now, as a grown adult], you would never accept them.

He noted that questions of the Messiah were of less dogmatic importance to Jews than most Christians imagine. The reason given by him for this bold statement was that it was more meritorious for the Jews to observe the precepts under a Christian ruler, while in exile and suffering humiliation and abuse, than under the rule of the Messiah, when every one would perforce act in accordance with the Law.

As the disputation seemed to turn in favor of Nachmanides, the Jews of Barcelona, fearing the resentment of the Dominicans, entreated him to discontinue; but the King, whom Nachmanides had acquainted with the apprehensions of the Jews, desired him to proceed. The controversy was therefore resumed, and concluded in what was considered a complete victory for Nachmanides, who was dismissed by the King with a gift of three hundred gold pieces as a mark of his respect. The King remarked that he had never encountered a man who, while yet being wrong, argued so well for his position. An alternative text reproduced by Julius Eisenstein in his Otzar Vicuchim (quoted by Charles Ber Chavel in his edition of the collected writings of Nachmanides) has the king saying that he never saw a man with no legal training argue a case so successfully.

The Dominicans, nevertheless, claimed the victory, and Nachmanides felt obligated to publish the text of the debates. From this publication Pablo selected certain passages which he construed as blasphemies against Christianity and denounced to the head of his order, Raymond de Penyafort. A capital charge was then instituted, and a formal complaint against the work and its author was lodged with the King. James was obliged to entertain the charge, but, mistrusting the Dominican court, called an extraordinary commission, and ordered that the proceedings be conducted in his presence. Nachmanides admitted that he had stated many things against Christianity, but he had written nothing which he had not used in his disputation in the presence of the King, who had granted him freedom of speech.

The justness of his defense was recognized by the King and the commission, but to satisfy the Dominicans, Nachmanides was sentenced to exile for two years and his pamphlet was condemned to be burned. He may also have been fined, but this was lifted as a favor to Benveniste ça Porta, who according to some authorities was Nachmanides' brother. The Dominicans, however, found this punishment too mild and, through Pope Clement IV, they seem to have succeeded in turning the two years' exile into perpetual banishment.

Other scholars believe that the identification of Bonastruc ça Porta with Nachmanides is incorrect. If so, then there were actually two people who were found to be blasphemous in the same time period and location.

== In Jerusalem ==
Nachmanides left Aragon and sojourned for three years somewhere in Castille or in the southern part of the Kingdom of France. In 1267, seeking refuge from Christian persecution in Muslim lands, he made aliyah to Jerusalem. There he established a synagogue in the Old City that exists until the present day, known as the Ramban Synagogue. Nachmanides then settled at Acre, where he was very active in spreading Jewish learning, which was at that time very much neglected in the Holy Land. He gathered a circle of pupils around him, and people came in crowds, even from the district of the Euphrates, to hear him. Karaites were said to have attended his lectures, among them Aaron ben Joseph the Elder, who later became one of the greatest Karaite authorities (although Graetz writes that there is no veracity to that). It was to arouse the interest of the local Jews in the exposition of the Bible that Nachmanides wrote the greatest of his works, the above-mentioned commentary on the Torah.

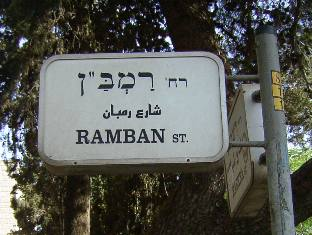
A street in Jerusalem bears his name

Although surrounded by friends and pupils, Nachmanides keenly felt the pangs of exile. "I left my family, I forsook my house. There, with my sons and daughters, the sweet, dear children I brought up at my knees, I left also my soul. My heart and my eyes will dwell with them forever." During his three-year stay in the Holy Land, Nachmanides maintained a correspondence with his native land, by means of which he endeavored to bring about a closer connection between Judea and Spain. Shortly after his arrival in Jerusalem, he addressed a letter to his son Nahman, in which he described the desolation of the Holy City, where there were at that time only two Jewish inhabitants—brothers, dyers by trade. In a later letter from Acre he counsels his son to cultivate humility, which he considers to be the first of virtues. In another, addressed to his second son, who occupied an official position at the Castilian court, Nachmanides recommends the recitation of the daily prayers and warns above all against immorality.

== Death and burial ==
Nachmanides died in the Holy Land after having passed the age of seventy or seventy-six. Different traditions suggest that he was buried in Haifa, Acre, Hebron, or in the Cave of the Ramban in Jerusalem.

== Works ==
Nachmanides, as outlined, authored major commentaries on Torah and the Talmud, confirming him as a leading Torah scholar of the Middle Ages. Further, as a posek, he wrote stand-alone works on Halachic topics. He also authored important monographs on mysticism and philosophy, as well as science.

=== Commentary on Torah ===
As detailed above, Ramban's commentary on the Torah, "Bi'ur" or Perush 'al ha-Torah, is considered a leading work in the genre; it was his last, and his best known. As outlined, he often critiques earlier commentaries - especially Rashi, Ibn Ezra and Rambam - and incorporates kabbalistic teachings. This commentary also reflects his love of Eretz Yisrael.

=== Talmudic commentary ===
Ramban's major work on the Talmud is referred to as Chiddushei haRamban. The commentary reflects his depth of knowledge and his deep respect for the legal authorities that came before him. It is not structured as running commentary on the Talmud; instead it focuses on specific parts of the Talmudic discussion. In approach, it fully utilizes the Tosafist dialectical style, and systematically integrates this with the classic Sephardic teachings. It thus bears a distinct similarity to the writings of the Tosafists; here, though, it will often provide a different perspective on a variety of issues. It is also heavily influenced by the teachings of Provence.

=== Other works ===
Nachmanides was a leading and prolific scholar; his output, as outlined, spanned Halacha, mysticism, science and philosophy.

- Nachmanides' known halakhic works - after the model of Isaac Alfasi - are:
  - Mishpetei ha-Cherem, the laws concerning excommunication, reproduced in Kol Bo
  - Hilkhot Bedikkah, on the examination of the lungs of slaughtered animals, cited by Shimshon ben Tzemach Duran in his Yavin Shemu'ah
  - Torat ha-Adam, on the laws of mourning and burial ceremonies, in thirty chapters, the last of which, entitled Sha'ar ha-Gemul, deals with eschatology (Constantinople, 1519, and frequently reprinted).
- Nachmanides' writings in the defense of Simeon Kayyara and Alfasi also belong in the category of his Talmudic and halachic works. These writings are:
  - Milhamot HaShem, defending Alfasi against the criticisms of Zerachiah ha-Levi of Girona (published with the "Alfasi", Venice, 1552; frequently reprinted; separate edition, Berlin, 1759)
  - Sefer ha-Zekhut, in defense of Alfasi against the criticisms of Abraham ben David (RABaD; printed with Abraham Meldola's Shiv'ah 'Enayim Leghorn, 1745; under the title Machaseh u-Magen, Venice, 1808)
  - Hassagot (Constantinople, 1510; frequently reprinted), in defense of Simeon Kayyara against the criticisms of Maimonides' Sefer Hamitzvot (Book of Precepts).
- Ethical, mystical and philosophic works:
  - Derashah, sermon delivered in the presence of the King of Castile
  - Sefer ha-Ge'ulah, or "Sefer Ketz ha-Ge'ulah", on the time of the arrival of the Messiah (in Azariah dei Rossi's Me'or 'Enayim Imre Binah, ch. xliii., and frequently reprinted)
  - Iggeret ha-Musar, ethical letter addressed to his son (in the "Sefer ha-Yir'ah," or "Iggeret ha-Teshuvah," of Jonah Gerondi)
  - Iggeret ha-Chemdah, letter addressed to the French rabbis in defense of Maimonides (with the "Ta'alumot Chokmah" of Joseph Delmedigo)
  - Vikkuach, religious controversy with Pablo Christiani (in the "Milchamot Chovah")
  - Perush Iyyov, commentary on Job

A collection of responsa are also commonly attributed to Nachmanides; they may in fact have been written by his student Shlomo ibn Aderet. Sodot HaTefilah, a Hebrew manuscript ascribed to Nachmanides, is similarly likely by Eleazar of Worms.

== See also ==
- Girona Synagogue
- List of Jewish immigrants to the Land of Israel

== Sources ==
- Caputo, Nina, Nahmanides in Medieval Catalonia: History, Community and Messianism. Notre Dame, IN: University of Notre Dame Press, 2008. Pp. 384.
- Joseph E. David, Dwelling within the Law: Nahmanides' Legal Theology, Oxford Journal of Law and Religion (2013), pp. 1–21.
