= Taroç family =

Sephardic Jewish family in Medieval Spain

Taroç family Família Taroç
- Parent family: Al-Taras
- Country: Spain, Ottoman Empire
- Etymology: Taroç is a Catalan spelling of the surname Al-Taras which means "embroider" in Arabic.
- Origin: Girona, Catalonia
- Founded: c. 1200
- Founder: Todros Taroç
- Traditions: Judaism (Sefard)

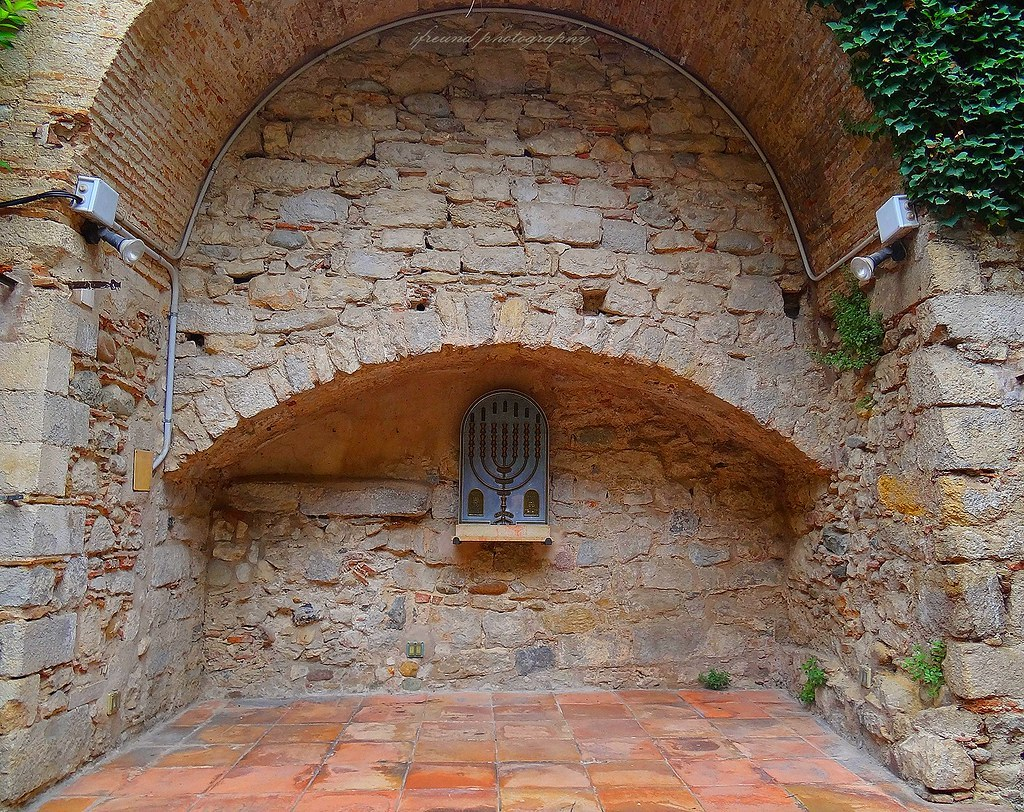
A wall of the Old Girona Synagogue, an ancestral site of the Taroç family.

The Taroç family (also spelt Teroç, Toroç and sometimes Taros) (Hebrew: טארוש, Tarosh) (Arabic:التاراس, al-Taras) is a Sephardic Jewish family originally from Girona, Catalonia. Members of the family occupied key positions in the courts and economy of Catalonia, becoming one of the wealthiest Jewish families in Catalonia during the 13th to 15th centuries. The family progenitor is Todros Taroç (born al-Taras), who was the son of Azriel ibn Menahem al-Taras, thus making the Taroç family a cadet branch of the al-Taras family from Castile. Todros Taroç adopted the surname Taroç which is a Catalan spelling of al-Taras which mans "embroider" in Arabic. Following the Alhambra decree of 1492, the majority of the family immigrated to the Ottoman Empire, the Levant and other parts of the Mediterranean and North Africa, adopting the surname Toros.

== History ==
The Al-Taras family probably came to Spain in the 8th-century and subsequently settled down in Castile. The Taroç family patriarch, Todros Taroç, had two sons, Todros Taroç II and Ibrahim Taroç. It seems that Ibrahim Taroç's male line died out around 1300, however his brothers line survived. Todros Taroç II had one son Vidal Taroç, who bought several profitable estates Montcada, and began to lend money to several Christian aristocrats in Barcelona. His son Isaac Taroç, inherited his father's estates and increased the family's profits tenfold. He had two children Salomo Abraham Taroç and Vidal Taroç II. Salomo Taroç was the first to establish a relationship with the ruling monarchs of Catalonia, possibly serving as a court physician for the Crown of Aragon. Similarly, his son Abraham David Taroç made jewellery for Eleanor of Aragon, later developing a close relationship with King John I, who even made a legal exemption for Abraham, allowing him to be married to two women at once. It was also around this time that Abraham began lending large sums of money to several Spanish nobles, resulting in Abraham's children becoming deeply engrained in the cultural and economic elite of Catalonia. However, the family's position began to deteriorate, as tensions rose between Jews and Christians. The last mention of a member of the family living in Spain before the expulsion of Jews in 1491 is Astruc Taroç II (Abraham Taroç's grandson), who, on July 9, 1492 helped to sell the historic Girona Synagogue, which the family helped to build and fund several hundred years prior. The majority of the family immigrated to Rhodes, later settling in Edirne and Istanbul, where they mostly live up until the present. Most Jews with the surname Toros descend from the Taroç family.
