= Isaac the Blind =

French writer and rabbi (c. 1160–1235)

Isaac the Blind (Hebrew: רַבִּי יִצְחַק סַגִּי נְהוֹר Rabbī Yīṣḥaq Saggī Nəhōr, literally "Rabbi Isaac, of much light"; c. 1160–1235 in Provence, France), was a French rabbi and a famous writer on Kabbalah (Jewish mysticism). The Aramaic epithet "Saggi Nehor" means "of Much Light" in the sense of having excellent eyesight, an ironic euphemism for being blind. Some historians suspect him to be the author of the Book of the Bahir, an important early text of Kabbalah. Others (especially Gershom Scholem, see his Origins of the Kabbalah, p. 253) characterize this view as an "erroneous and totally unfounded hypothesis".

Isaac was the son of the famous talmudist Abraham ben David of Posquières (Raavad).

The Bahir first appeared in the Middle Ages, around 1200 CE in France. It discusses a number of ideas that became important for Kabbalah, and even though the origins of the anonymous work are obscure, there were important Kabbalists who were writing at the same time in France. The most influential of these was Isaac the Blind.

== Isaac the Blind's mystical concepts ==
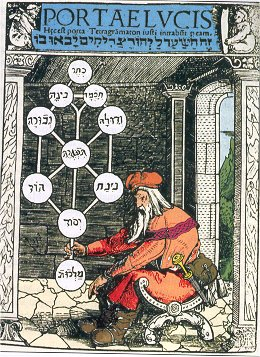
Image popularly thought to be a portrait of Isaac

Isaac considered the sefirot as having their origins in a hidden and infinite level deep within the Ayn Sof, or Divine Being (lit. That Without End).

He believed that from the Ayn Sof emanated makhshava (Divine Thought), which was the first supernatural quality. The rest of the sefirot emanated from the Divine Thought. Individual beings in the world are material manifestation of the sefirot, albeit on a lower level of reality. Mystic experience aids in reascending the levels of emanations to unite with Divine Thought.

The most famous student of Isaac was Azriel of Gerona.

== See also ==
- Hachmei Provence
- Aaron of Cardena
- Girona Synagogue
