= Azriel of Gerona =

Spanish rabbi and kabbalist

Personal life
- Born: Azriel ben Menahem c. 1160 Girona, County of Barcelona
- Died: c. 1238 (aged around 78) Girona, Principality of Catalonia, Crown of Aragon
- Children: Rav Yehudi al-Taras; Todros Taroç (al-Taras); Ezra al-Taras
- Parent: Rabbi Menahem of Gerona (father)
- Dynasty: al-Taras

Religious life
- Religion: Judaism

Jewish leader
- Predecessor: Isaac the Blind
- Successor: Nachmanides and Abraham Zacuto
- Main work: Shaar ha-Shoel
- Dynasty: al-Taras

Azriel ibn Menahem ibn Ibrahim al-Taras (Arabic: عزريل بن مناحيم بن ابراهيم التاراس, romanized: ʿAzrayl bin Mināḥīm bin Ibrāhīm at-Tārās; Hebrew: עזריאל בן מנחם בן אברהם אלתראס, romanized: ʿAzrīʾēl ben Mənaḥēm ben ʾAḇrāhām ʾal-Tarās; c. 1160 – c. 1238), also known as Azriel of Gerona or Girona, was the founder of speculative Kabbalah and the Gironian Kabbalist school. He is known for implementing Neoplatonic thought into mainstream kabbalistic tradition.

== Biography ==
Azriel ibn Menahem ibn Ibrahim al-Taras was born around 1160 in Girona, then in the County of Barcelona, to the al-Taras family. His father Menahem was a minor rabbi in Girona. In his early years, Azriel moved to southern France, where he studied under Isaac the Blind. Azriel later travelled across Spain, preaching his kabbalistic views, however this proved to be unsuccessful, with Azriel later stating that "the philosophers believe in nothing that can not be demonstrated logically." He later returned to Girona, where he founded a kabbalistic school. Amongst his main students, were Nachmanides and Abraham Zacuto. The poet Meshullam of Gerona hails Azriel as the greatest Kabbalist of Spain, and Isaac the Blind, later opposed Azriel's open propagation of kabbalistic doctrines in wider circles.

== Theology ==
According to Azriel, the status and importance of the will of God surpasses all other attributes. He laid the foundation for the idea of Ein-Sof, by stating that God can have no desire, thought, word, or action, emphasizing it by the negation of any attribute. Azriel goes on to adopt a gnostic approach, going as far as to say that all qualities of God are ascribed. Azriel investigates the relation of this En-Sof to the universe, asking "has the universe been created from nothing?" he explains "No, Aristotle is perfectly right in saying that nothing can proceed from nothing. Moreover, creation implies a decrease in the Creator's essence through subtraction, and that can not be predicated of the En-Sof. Nor can the universe have existed eternally, as Aristotle asserts, because nothing is eternal except for God." In order to solve the problem of creation, Azriel recourses to the theory of emanation, which he develops as follows:

The universe, with all its manifestations, was latent in the essence of the En-Sof, in which, notwithstanding its infinite variety, it formed an absolute unit, just like the various sparks and colors that proceed from the one and indivisible flame potential in the coal. The act of creation did not consist in producing an absolutely new thing; it was merely a transformation of potential existence into realized existence. Thus there was really no creation, but an Atziluth. The effluence was effectuated through successive gradations from the intellectual world to the material, from the indefinite to the definite. This material world, being limited and not perfect, could not proceed directly from the En-Sof; neither could it be independent of God. In that case God would be imperfect. There must have been, therefore, intermediaries between the En-Sof and the material world, and these intermediaries were the Ten Sefirot. The first Sefirah was latent in the En-Sof as a dynamic force. The second Sefirah emanated as a substratum for the intellectual world; afterward the other Sefirot emanated, forming the moral, the material, and the natural worlds. But this fact of emanation does not imply a gradation in the En-Sof, the flame of which is capable of igniting an indefinite number of lights. The Sefirot, according to their nature, are divided into three groups: the three superior forming the world of thought, the next three the world of soul, the last four the world of corporeality. They all depend upon one another, being united like links to the first one. Each of them has a positive and a passive quality, which emanates and receives.

== Works ==
Azriel's works are as:

- Shaar ha-Shoel ("The Gate of the Enquirer") - an explanation of the doctrine of the ten Sefirot in question and answer form, with the addition of Azriel's personal commentary.
- Perush Sefer Yetzirah - a commentary on Sefer Yetzirah.
- Perush Aggadot - a commentary to the talmudic aggadot.
- Perush Tefillah - a commentary on the Jewish liturgy.

Azriel also wrote a number of shorter treatises, the most important of which is a large section of a partly-preserved work called Derekh haEmunah veDerekh haKefirah ("The Way of Belief and the Way of Heresy").
