= Outline of Judaism =

Ethnic religion of the Jewish people

The following outline is provided as an overview of and topical guide to Judaism:

== History ==
- Origins of Judaism
- Jewish history

=== Pre-monarchic period ===
- Ugaritic mythology – The Levant region was inhabited by people who themselves referred to the land as "ca-na-na-um" as early as the mid-third millennium BCE
- Ancient semitic religions – The term ancient Semitic religion encompasses the polytheistic religions of the Semitic speaking peoples of the ancient Near East and Northeast Africa. Its origins are intertwined with Mesopotamian mythology.
- El (deity) – the supreme god of the Canaanite religion and the supreme god of the Mesopotamian Semites in the pre-Sargonic period.
- Elyon – "God Most High"
- El Shaddai – "God Almighty"
- Elohim – a grammatically singular or plural noun for "god" or "gods" in both modern and ancient Hebrew language.
- Asherah – a Semitic mother goddess, the wife or consort of the Sumerian Anu or Ugaritic El, the oldest deities of their pantheons
- Baal – a Northwest Semitic title and honorific meaning "master" or "lord" that is used for various gods who were patrons of cities in the Levant and Asia Minor
- Yahweh – the national god of the Iron Age kingdoms of Israel (Samaria) and Judah.
- Tetragrammaton – YHWH

=== Monarchic period ===
==== United monarchy ====
- King Saul – the first king of the united Kingdom of Israel.
- Ish-bosheth – the second king of the united Kingdom
- King David – the third king of the United Kingdom of Israel
- King Solomon – the final king before the northern Kingdom of Israel and the southern Kingdom of Judah
- Solomon's Temple – the First Temple, was the main temple in ancient Jerusalem, on the Temple Mount (also known as Mount Zion), before its destruction by Nebuchadnezzar II after the Siege of Jerusalem of 587 BCE.

Further information:

- Tel Dan Stele – a stele (inscribed stone) discovered in 1993/94 during excavations at Tel Dan in northern Israel.
- Mesha Stele – a black basalt stone bearing an inscription by the 9th century BC ruler Mesha of Moab in Jordan.

==== Divided monarchy ====
- History of ancient Israel and Judah

===== Kingdom of Judah =====
====== Kings of Judah ======
- Rehoboam
- Abijah
- Asa
- Jehoshaphat
- Jehoram
- Ahaziah
- Athaliah
- J(eh)oash
- Amaziah
- Uzziah/Azariah
- Jotham
- Ahaz
- Hezekiah
- Manasseh
- Amon
- Josiah
- Jehoahaz
- Jehoiakim
- Jeconiah/Jehoiachin
- Zedekiah

====== Major events ======
- Babylonian captivity

Further information:

- Jeremiah

===== Kingdom of Israel =====
====== Kings of Israel ======
House of Jeroboam

- Jeroboam I
- Nadab

House of Baasha

- Baasha
- Elah

House of Zimri

- Zimri

House of Omri

- Omri
- Ahab
- Ahaziah
- Joram

House of Jehu

- Jehu
- Jehoahaz
- Jehoash(Joash)
- Jeroboam II
- Zachariah

House of Shallum

- Shallum

House of Menahem

- Menahem
- Pekahiah

House of Pekah

- Pekah

House of Hoshea

- Hoshea

====== Major events ======
- Assyrian captivity – 720 BC
- Ten Lost Tribes

=== Return from captivity ===
- Cyrus's edict
- Ezra
- Nehemiah
- Second Temple Judaism
- Hellenistic Judaism
- Hasmonean dynasty

== Development of Rabbinic Judaism ==
- Jerusalem
  - Temple in Jerusalem
  - Jerusalem in Judaism
  - Timeline of Jerusalem
- Herod
- Sanhedrin
- Pharisees
- Sadducees
- Essenes
- Jewish–Roman wars
  - First Jewish–Roman War
  - Kitos War
  - Bar Kokhba revolt
- Diaspora
- Middle Ages
- Muslim rule
- Haskalah
- Emancipation
- The Holocaust
- Aliyah
- History of Zionism
- History of Israel
- Land of Israel

== Sacred texts ==
=== Written Torah ===
- Tanakh
  - Torah
    - Chumash–a Torah in printed form
  - Nevi'im
  - Ketuvim

=== Oral Torah ===
- Oral Torah
  - Talmud (as encompassing the main Oral Law)
    - Jerusalem Talmud
    - Babylonian Talmud
      - Mishnah, the first major written redaction of the Jewish oral traditions known as the "Oral Torah".
        - Gemara, rabbinical analysis of and commentary on the Mishnah
        - Aggadah, a compendium of rabbinic texts that incorporates folklore, historical anecdotes, moral exhortations, and practical advice in various spheres, from business to medicine.
  - Tosefta, a compilation of the Jewish oral law from the late 2nd century, the period of the Mishnah
  - Midrash, the genre of rabbinic literature which contains early interpretations and commentaries on the Written Torah and Oral Torah (spoken law and sermons), as well as non-legalistic rabbinic literature (aggadah) and occasionally the Jewish religious laws (halakha), which usually form a running commentary on specific passages in the Hebrew Scripture (Tanakh).[2]
  - Midrash halakha
- Kabbalah and other mystical writings
- Geonim, presidents of the two great Babylonian, Talmudic Academies of Sura and Pumbedita, in the Abbasid Caliphate, and generally accepted spiritual leaders of the Jewish community worldwide in the early medieval era
- Rishonim, the leading rabbis and poskim who lived approximately during the 11th to 15th centuries, in the era before the writing of the Shulchan Aruch (Hebrew: שׁוּלחָן עָרוּך, "Set Table", a common printed code of Jewish law, 1563 CE) and following the Geonim (589–1038 CE)
- Acharonim, the leading rabbis and poskim (Jewish legal decisors) living from roughly the 16th century to the present, and more specifically since the writing of the Shulchan Aruch (Hebrew: שׁוּלחָן עָרוּך, "Set Table", a code of Jewish law) in 1563 CE.
  - Hasidut
  - Musar literature

== Rabbinic literature ==
Rabbinic literature, in its broadest sense, can mean the entire spectrum of rabbinic writings throughout Jewish history. But the term often refers specifically to literature from the Talmudic era, as opposed to medieval and modern rabbinic writing, and thus corresponds with the Hebrew term Sifrut Hazal (ספרות חז"ל; "Literature [of our] sages [of] blessed memory", where Hazal normally refers only to the sages of the Talmudic era). This more specific sense of "Rabbinic literature"—referring to the Talmudim, Midrash, and related writings, but hardly ever to later texts—is how the term is generally intended when used in contemporary academic writing. On the other hand, the terms meforshim and parshanim (commentaries/commentators) almost always refer to later, post-Talmudic writers of Rabbinic glosses on Biblical and Talmudic texts.

=== Mishnaic literature ===
The Mishnah and the Tosefta (compiled from materials pre-dating the year 200) are the earliest extant works of rabbinic literature, expounding and developing Judaism's Oral Law, as well as ethical teachings. Following these came the two Talmuds:

- The Jerusalem Talmud, c. 450
- The Babylonian Talmud, c. 600
- The minor tractates (part of the Babylonian Talmud)

=== The Midrash ===
The midrash is the genre of rabbinic literature which contains early interpretations and commentaries on the Written Torah and Oral Torah, as well as non-legalistic rabbinic literature (aggadah) and occasionally the Jewish religious laws (halakha), which usually form a running commentary on specific passages in the Tanakh. The term midrash also can refer to a compilation of Midrashic teachings, in the form of legal, exegetical, homiletical, or narrative writing, often configured as a commentary on the Bible or Mishnah.

=== Later works by category ===
==== Major codes of Jewish law ====
Halakha

- Mishneh Torah
- Arba'ah Turim
- Shulchan Aruch
- Beit Yosef
- Chayei Adam
- The Responsa literature

==== Jewish thought, mysticism and ethics ====
- Aggadah:
  - Aggadic Midrashim
  - Ein Yaakov
- Jewish philosophy:
  - Philo
  - Isaac Israeli
  - Emunot v'Dayyot
  - Guide to the Perplexed
  - Bachya ibn Pakuda
  - Sefer ha-Ikkarim
  - Book of the Wars of the Lord
  - Or Adonai
- Jewish mysticism and Kabbalah:
  - Kabbalah: Primary texts
  - Sepher Yetzirah
  - Bahir
  - Zohar
  - Sefer Raziel HaMalakh
  - Pardes Rimonim
  - Etz Hayim
- The works of Hasidic Judaism:
  - The Tanya (Likutei Amarim)
  - Likutey Moharan
  - Shem Mishmuel
  - Tzavaat HaRivash
- Musar literature:
  - Mesillat Yesharim
  - Shaarei Teshuva
  - Orchot Tzaddikim
  - Sefer Chasidim
  - The Lonely Man of Faith

=== Liturgy ===
- The Siddur and Jewish liturgy
- Piyyutim (Classical Jewish poetry)

== Later rabbinic works by historical period ==
=== Works of the Geonim ===
The Geonim are the rabbis of Sura and Pumbeditha, in Babylon (650–1250) :

- She'iltoth of Achai Gaon
- Halachoth Gedoloth
- Emunoth ve-Deoth (Saadia Gaon)
- The Siddur by Amram Gaon
- Responsa

=== Works of the Rishonim (the "early" rabbinical commentators) ===
The Rishonim are the rabbis of the early medieval period (1000–1550), such as the following main examples:

- The commentaries on the Torah, such as those by Rashi, Abraham ibn Ezra and Nahmanides.
- Commentaries on the Talmud, principally by Rashi, his grandson Samuel ben Meir and Nissim of Gerona.
- Talmudic novellae (chiddushim) by Tosafists, Nahmanides, Nissim of Gerona, Solomon ben Aderet (RaShBA), Yomtov ben Ashbili (Ritva)
- Works of halakha (Asher ben Yechiel, Mordechai ben Hillel)
- Codices by Maimonides and Jacob ben Asher, and finally Shulkhan Arukh
- Legal responsa, e.g. by Solomon ben Aderet (RaShBA)
- Jewish philosophical rationalist works (Maimonides, Gersonides etc.)
- Kabbalistic mystical works (such as the Zohar)
- Mussar literature ethical works (Bahya ibn Paquda, Jonah of Gerona)

=== Works of the Acharonim (the "later" rabbinical commentators) ===
The Acharonim are the rabbis from 1550 to the present day, such as the following main examples:

- Important Torah commentaries include Keli Yakar (Shlomo Ephraim Luntschitz), Ohr ha-Chayim by Chayim ben-Attar, the commentary of Samson Raphael Hirsch, and the commentary of Naftali Zvi Yehuda Berlin
- Important works of Talmudic novellae include: Pnei Yehoshua, Hafla'ah, Sha'agath Aryei
- Codices of halakha e.g. for Sephardim: Ben Ish Hai by Yosef Hayyim, Kaf ha-Ḥayim by Yaakov Chaim Sofer and the Yalkut Yosef;
  for Ashkenazim: Mishnah Berurah by Yisrael Meir Kagan and the Aruch ha-Shulchan by Yechiel Michel Epstein
- Legal responsa, e.g. by Moses Sofer, Moshe Feinstein
- Kabbalistic mystical commentaries
- Philosophical/metaphysical works (the works of the Maharal of Prague, Moshe Chaim Luzzatto and Nefesh ha-Chayim by Chaim of Volozhin)
- Hasidic works (Kedushath Levi, Sefath Emmeth, Shem mi-Shemuel)
- Mussar literature ethical works: Moshe Chaim Luzzatto, Yisrael Meir Kagan and the Mussar Movement
- Historical works, e.g. Shem ha-Gedolim by Chaim Joseph David Azulai.

=== Meforshim ===
Meforshim is a Hebrew word meaning "(classical rabbinical) commentators" (or roughly meaning "exegetes"), and is used as a substitute for the correct word perushim which means "commentaries". In Judaism this term refers to commentaries on the Torah (five books of Moses), Tanakh, the Mishnah, the Talmud, responsa, even the siddur (Jewish prayerbook), and more.

=== Classic Torah and Talmud commentaries ===
Classic Torah and/or Talmud commentaries have been written by the following individuals:

- Geonim
  - Saadia Gaon, 10th century Babylon
- Rishonim
  - Rashi (Shlomo Yitzchaki), 12th century France
  - Abraham ibn Ezra
  - Nachmanides (Moshe ben Nahman)
  - Samuel ben Meir, the Rashbam, 12th century France
  - Levi ben Gershom (known as Ralbag or Gersonides)
  - David Kimhi, 13th century France
  - Joseph ben Isaac Bekhor Shor, 12th century France
  - Nissim of Gerona, the RaN, 14th century Spain
  - Isaac Abarbanel (1437–1508)
  - Obadiah ben Jacob Sforno, 16th century Italy
- Acharonim
  - The Vilna Gaon, Rabbi Eliyahu of Vilna, 18th century Lithuania
  - The Malbim, Meir Leibush ben Yehiel Michel Wisser

Classical Talmudic commentaries were written by Rashi. After Rashi the Tosafot were written, which was an omnibus commentary on the Talmud by the disciples and descendants of Rashi; this commentary was based on discussions done in the rabbinic academies of Germany and France.

== Branches and denominations ==
- Sadducees (In Second Temple times)
- Hellenistic Judaism
- Karaite Judaism
- Sabbateans
- Haymanot Judaism (Beta Israel)
- Rabbinic Judaism
  - Pharisees (In Second Temple times)
  - Orthodox Judaism
    - Misnagdim
    - Modern Orthodox Judaism
    - Haredi Judaism (including Hasidic Judaism)
      - Hardal
      - Neturei Karta
- Conservative (Masorti) Judaism
- Reform Judaism
- New Religious Movement
  - Reconstructionist Judaism
  - Jewish Renewal
  - Humanistic Judaism
  - Neolog Judaism
  - Jewish Science
  - Messianic Judaism (regarded by virtually all mainstream Jewish denominations as a Christian group)
  - Black Judaism
  - Frankism
- Religious Zionism (Interdenominational)

== Behavior and experience ==
- Jew (word)
- Who is a Jew?
- Abortion
- Adoption
- Bar and Bat Mitzvah
- Bereavement
- Brit milah (Circumcision)
  - Hatafat dam brit
- Cuisine
- Marriage
  - Interfaith marriage
- Menstruation
- Minyan
- Pidyon haben (Redemption of a firstborn son)
- Shidduch (Matchmaking)
- Zeved habat (Naming ceremony for newborn girls)
- Wedding

=== Holy days and observances ===
- Jewish holidays
- Shabbat

Major

- Passover
- Shavuot
- Rosh Hashanah
- Yom Kippur
- Sukkot
- Simchat Torah
- Shemini Atzeret
- Rosh Chodesh

Minor

- Purim
- Hanukkah
- Yom Ha'atzmaut

Fast days

- Seventeenth of Tammuz
- Tisha B'Av
- Fast of Esther
- Fast of Gedalia

== Belief and doctrine ==
- Monotheism
- Philosophy
- Principles of faith
- Chosen people
- Eschatology
  - Category:Jewish eschatology
    - Armilus
    - Atchalta De'Geulah
    - Gathering of Israel
    - Gog and Magog
    - Jewish messianism
    - Year 6000
    - Messiah ben Joseph
    - Messiah ben David
    - The Messiah at the Gates of Rome
- Jewish ethics
  - Chillul Hashem
  - Geneivat da'at
  - Kiddush Hashem
  - Lashon hara
  - Lifnei iver
  - Retzach
- Holocaust theology
- Tzedakah
- Tzniut
- Shatnez

=== Law ===
- Halakha
- 613 Mitzvot
- Seven Laws of Noah
- Ten Commandments

==== Major legal codes and works ====
- Midrash halakha
- Arba'ah Turim and Shulchan Aruch
  - Orach Chayim
  - Yoreh De'ah
  - Even Ha'ezer
  - Choshen Mishpat
- Mishneh Torah
- Sefer Hamitzvot
- Shulchan Aruch HaRav
- Chayei Adam
- Kitzur Shulchan Aruch
- Mishnah Berurah
- Aruch HaShulchan

=== Examples of legal principles ===
- Aveira
- Bemeizid
- B'rov am hadrat melech
- Chumra
- D'Oraita and D'Rabbanan
- Mitzvah goreret mitzvah
- Ikar v'tafel
- Neder
- Osek b'mitzvah patur min hamitzvah
- Pikuach nefesh
- Positive time-bound mitzvot
- Self-sacrifice in Jewish law
- Shomea k'oneh
- Toch k'dei dibur
- Yad soledet bo

==== Examples of Biblical punishments ====
- Capital punishment
- Kareth
- Stoning

=== Dietary laws and customs ===
- Kashrut
  - Kosher animals
  - Kosher fish list
  - Kosher foods
  - Kosher wine
- Mashgiach
- Milk and meat in Jewish law
- Slaughter
- Hechsher
- Vegetarianism

=== Names of God ===
- Category:Tetragrammaton
  - Shem HaMephorash
- Ancient of Days
- El
- El Roi
- El Shaddai
- Elohim
- I Am that I Am
- Shaddai

=== Mysticism and the esoteric ===
- Category:Jewish mysticism
  - Category:Jewish mystical texts
- Kabbalah
  - Category:Kabbalah
    - Category:Kabbalah texts
    - Category:Kabbalists
      - Timeline List of Jewish Kabbalists
    - Category:Practical Kabbalah
    - Category:Kabbalistic words and phrases
      - Ein Sof
      - Ohr
      - Category:Four Worlds
        - Atziluth
        - Beri'ah
        - Yetzirah
        - Assiah
      - Category:Sefirot
        - Keter
        - Chokmah
        - Binah
        - Da'at
        - Chesed
        - Gevurah
        - Tiferet
        - Netzach
        - Hod
        - Yesod
        - Malkuth
    - Category:Angels in Judaism
    - Kabbalistic angelic hierarchy
    - Category:Kabbalah stubs

== Religious articles and prayers ==
- Aleinu
- Amidah
- Four Species
- Gartel
- Hallel
- Havdalah
- Kaddish
- Kittel
- Kol Nidre
- Ma Tovu
- Menorah
- Hanukiah
- Mezuzah
- Prayers
- Sefer Torah
- Services
- Shema Yisrael
- Shofar
- Tallit
- Tefillin
- Tzitzit
- Yad
- Kippah/Yarmulke

== Conversion ==
- Conversion to Judaism
- Gerim (righteous proselytes)
- Tevilah
- Mikveh
- Category:Converts to Judaism
  - Category:Converts to Judaism from atheism or agnosticism
  - Category:Converts to Judaism from Christianity
  - Category:Converts to Judaism from Islam
  - Category:Converts to Judaism from Oriental Orthodoxy
  - Category:Groups who converted to Judaism

=== Return to Judaism ===
- Who is a Jew?
- Baal teshuva
  - Baal teshuva movement
  - Category:Baalei teshuva institutions
  - Category:Conservative Judaism outreach
  - Category:Orthodox Jewish outreach
  - Category:Reform Judaism outreach
- Atonement in Judaism
- Confession (Judaism)
- Repentance in Judaism

=== Irreligion ===
- Haskalah
- Jewish secularism
  - Secularism in Israel
  - Category:Jewish secularism
  - Category:Secular Jewish culture by country
- Jewish atheism
  - Category:Jewish skeptics
  - Category:Jewish agnostics
  - Category:Jewish atheists
- Off the derech (Ex-Haredim, Yetzia bish'eila)
- Jewish anarchism

=== Apostasy ===
- Apostasy in Judaism
- Epikoros
- Heresy in Judaism
- Jewish schisms
- Category:Converts from Judaism
  - Category:Converts to Christianity from Judaism
  - Category:Converts to Islam from Judaism
  - List of converts from Judaism

== Interactions with other religions and cultures ==
- Abrahamic religions
- Black Hebrew Israelites
- Christianity and Judaism
  - Catholic Church and Judaism
  - Christian–Jewish reconciliation
  - Judaism and Mormonism
  - Messianic Judaism
- Islamic–Jewish relations
- Jewish Buddhist
- Jewish views on religious pluralism
- Semitic neopaganism

== See also ==
- Outline of Jewish history
