= Punishments in Judaism =

Punishment in Judaism refers to the sanctions imposed for intentional violations of Torah laws (called "613 commandments" or "taryág mitsvót") These punishments can be categorized into two main types: punishments administered "by the hands of Heaven" (Mita beyadei shamaim) and those administered "by the hands of man". Punishments by the hands of Heaven, such as "Kareth", are specified in the Torah for certain transgressions. Punishments administered by the hands of man include judicial penalties that were historically enforced by a rabbinical court, such as Malkot.

== God-related punishment ==
God-related punishments usually refer to punishments administered by the hands of Heaven, or in Hebrew: "Mita beyadei shamaim" (מיתה בידי שמיים). They also include punishments that practice Jewish mysticism. There are a couple of punishments in this category.

=== Kareth ===
The Hebrew term kareth ("cutting off" Hebrew: כָּרֵת, [kaˈret]), or extirpation, is a form of punishment for sin, mentioned in the Hebrew Bible and later Jewish writings. The typical Biblical phrase used is "that soul shall be cut off from its people" or a slight variation of this.

In the Hebrew Bible, verbs that underlie the later use of the noun form kareth refer to forms of punishment including premature death, or else exclusion from the people.

Kareth is the punishment for certain crimes and offences defined under Jewish law (e.g. eating the life blood of a living animal, eating suet, refusing to be circumcised, etc.)

=== Korban ===
The term korban (קָרְבָּן, qorbān) primarily refers to sacrificial offerings given from humans to God for the purpose of doing homage, winning favor, or securing pardon.

Some of the sacrificial offerings described in the Torah are obligations imposed on individuals for specific sins. The nature of these offerings can be debated—whether they serve as a form of punishment or as a means of atonement, often signifying complete forgiveness granted by God. However, it is clear that these offerings represent a mandated form of restitution. Individuals who commit these transgressions are required to present a sacrifice, and the judicial authorities (beth din) may enforce compliance with this requirement.

== Human-related punishment ==
=== Capital punishment ===
Capital and corporal punishment in Judaism have a complex history which has been a subject of extensive debate, but most forms of capital punishment were included - stoning, burning, decapitation, and strangulation. These punishments were executed or ordered when someone broke the Laws of Moses, which included adultery, child sacrifice, rape, murder, kidnapping, idolatry, striking, cursing, rebelling, homosexual relations and more.

=== Malkot ===
Malkot is a type of flagellation, and a punishment mentioned in the Torah. The punishment was given to Jews who violated one of Mitzvah's of Lo Tease bemeizid. According to Hebrew teachings, Malkot cannot prevent a punishment that is yet to come afterlife.

In Judaism, there are 207 violations that could result in Malkot. The laws of Malkot can be found in Masekhet Makkot.

=== Ayn tahat ayn ===
In biblical law, punishment is not limited to death and flagellation; it also includes the principle of an "eye for an eye" (Hebrew: עין תחת עין, Ayn tahat ayn) as a potential consequence for individuals who cause bodily harm to others, as well as for false witnesses seeking to inflict harm on others. According to the interpretation of the Oral Torah, this law does not advocate literal corporal punishment for those who injure others, but instead mandates financial compensation for physical damage, consistent with the principles of tort in Judaism.

=== Knas ===
A Knas (Hebrew: קנס) is a monetary penalty that an individual is required to pay, not as direct compensation for damages but rather as a form of punishment or deterrence, similar to a modern-day fine. in the Jewish law however, there were different types of Knas for different types of punishments.

=== Arê Miklat ===
The cities of refuge (Hebrew: ערי המקלט ‘ārê ha-miqlāṭ) were six Levitical towns in the Kingdom of Israel and the Kingdom of Judah in which the perpetrators of accidental manslaughter could claim the right of asylum. Some were punished and were thrown to these cities as a corporal punishment.

=== Haknasa LeKippa ===
Haknasa LeKippa (Hebrew: הכנסה לכיפה) refers to a form of imprisonment intended to lead to the death of criminals without direct execution (see Immurement). This punishment is not derived from the Torah but is a rabbinic penalty developed by the beth din.
