= Outline of Jewish history =

Ethnoreligious group's past

For historical and contemporary Jewish populations by country, see Jews by country.

== By period ==
=== Ancient period ===
- Ancient Israel and Judah
  - Israelites
  - Kingdom of Judah
  - Kingdom of Israel
- Hebrew Bible
- Biblical archeology
  - Canaanite and Aramaic inscriptions
  - Ancient Hebrew texts
- Assyrian captivity
  - Ten Lost Tribes
- Judah's revolts against Babylon
  - Siege of Jerusalem (587 BCE)
- Babylonian captivity

=== Second Temple period ===
- Second Temple period
- Yehud (Persian province)
- Maccabean revolt
- Hasmonean dynasty
- Herodian dynasty
- Roman Judaea
- Jewish-Roman Wars
  - First Jewish-Roman War
    - The Jewish War
    - Jerusalem riots of 66
    - Alexandria riot (66)
    - Siege of Yodfat
    - Battle of Beth Horon (66)
    - Siege of Gush Halav
    - Zealot Temple Siege
    - Siege of Jerusalem (70 CE)
    - Siege of Masada
  - Kitos War
  - Bar Kokhba revolt
- Second Temple Judaism
  - Pharisees
  - Sadducees
  - Essenes
  - Zealots
  - Jewish Christians
- Archaeology
  - Dead Sea Scrolls

=== Late antiquity ===
- History of the Jews in the Roman Empire
- Talmudic academies in Babylonia
- Jewish revolt against Heraclius

=== Medieval period ===
- History of European Jews in the Middle Ages
- Golden age of Jewish culture in Spain
- Medieval antisemitism
- Persecution of Jews during the Black Death
- Edict of Expulsion
- Golden age of Jewish culture in Spain
- History of the Jews and the Crusades
- Islam and Judaism
- History of the Jews under Muslim rule
- Cairo Geniza

=== Modern period ===
- Zionism
- History of Zionism
- History of the Jews during World War II
- The Holocaust
- History of Israel
  - History of Israel (1948–present)

== By country or region ==
- History of the Jews in Africa
- History of the Jews in Afghanistan
- History of the Jews in Austria
  - History of the Jews in Innsbruck
- History of the Jews in Belarus
- History of the Jews in Central Asia
- History of the Jews in China
  - Kaifeng Jews
- History of the Jews in the Czech Republic
- History of the Jews in Egypt
- History of the Jews in Ethiopia
  - Beta Israel
- History of the Jews in Europe
  - Antisemitism in Europe
- History of the Jews in France
  - Antisemitism in France
- History of the Jews in Germany
  - Antisemitism in 21st-century Germany
- History of the Jews in Hungary
- History of the Jews in India
  - Baghdadi Jews
  - Bene Ephraim
  - Bene Israel
  - Bnei Menashe
  - Cochin Jews
  - History of the Jews in Kolkata
  - Jewish Community of Mumbai
  - Paradesi Jews
  - Sephardic Jews in India
- History of the Jews in Iran
  - Persian Jews
- History of the Jews in Iraq
- History of the Jews in the Land of Israel
- History of the Jews in Latin America and the Caribbean
- History of the Jews under Muslim rule
  - Antisemitism in the Arab world
  - Antisemitism in Islam
  - Islamic–Jewish relations
  - Relations between Nazi Germany and the Arab world
- History of the Jews in Poland
- History of the Jews in Romania
- History of the Jews in Russia
  - Antisemitism in Russia
  - History of the Jews in the Soviet Union
  - Antisemitism in the Soviet Union
- History of the Jews in Serbia
- History of the Jews in Ukraine
  - Antisemitism in Ukraine
- History of the Jews in the United Kingdom
  - Antisemitism in the United Kingdom
    - History of the Jews in England
    - History of the Jews in Scotland
    - Resettlement of the Jews in England
- History of the Jews in the United States
  - American Jews
  - Antisemitism in the United States
  - Antisemitism in the United States in the 21st century
  - History of antisemitism in the United States
  - History of the Jews in Baltimore
  - History of the Jews in Chicago
  - History of the Jews in Colonial America
  - History of the Jews in Los Angeles
  - History of the Jews in New York
  - History of the Jews in Philadelphia
  - History of the Jews in San Francisco
  - History of the Jews in South Florida
  - History of the Jews in Washington, D.C.

== Timelines ==
- Kings of Israel and Judah
- Timeline of Jewish history
- Timeline of anti-Zionism
- Timeline of antisemitism
- Timeline of antisemitism in the 19th century
- Timeline of antisemitism in the 20th century
- Timeline of antisemitism in the 21st century
- Timeline of the Holocaust
- Timeline of the Palestine region
- Timeline of Zionism

== Languages ==
- Hebrew
  - Biblical Hebrew
  - Mishnaic Hebrew
  - Modern Hebrew
- Aramaic
  - Jewish Palestinian Aramaic
  - Jewish Babylonian Aramaic
  - Jewish Neo-Aramaic dialect of Barzani
  - Jewish Neo-Aramaic dialect of Betanure
  - Jewish Neo-Aramaic dialect of Zakho
  - Northeastern Neo-Aramaic
  - Trans-Zab Jewish Neo-Aramaic
  - Inter-Zab Jewish Neo-Aramaic
- Judaeo-Spanish
- Judeo-Persian
- Arabic
  - Judeo-Iraqi Arabic
  - Judeo-Moroccan Arabic
  - Judeo-Tripolitanian Arabic
  - Judeo-Tunisian Arabic
  - Judeo-Yemeni Arabic
- Yevanic
- Yiddish

== See also ==
- Index of Jewish history–related articles
- Jewish ethnic divisions
- Outline of Judaism
- Timeline of Jewish history
- Traditional Jewish chronology
