= KLI =

KLI may refer to:

- Klingon Language Institute − promoting the constructed Klingon language
- Konrad Lorenz Institute for Evolution and Cognition Research, Klosterneuburg, Austria.
- Yonsei University Korean Language Institute
- Kli rishon (or K'li), a "heated vessel" in Judaism, e.g. in Sabbath food preparation
