= Mitzvat lo te'aseh =

Jewish term describing a group of duties with negative imperatives

Mitzvat lo te'aseh (Also called: Negative commandment, Hebrew: מצוות לא תעשה, lit. 'mitzvah you will not do', Also called Lavim, Hebrew: לאווים) is a Jewish term describing a group of mitzvah's with negative imperatives, for example: Thou shalt not kill, Thou shalt not steal etc. The most common punishments for breaking these mitzvah's include malkot or arba mitot beth din.

== Background ==
The 613 commandments (also called taryág mitsvót, Hebrew: תרי"ג מצוות) of the Torah are categorized into two types: positive commandments, which instruct individuals to perform certain actions, and negative commandments, which instruct individuals to refrain from certain actions. The commandments that fall under the first category and are known as mitzvot aseh (מצוות עשה), while others belong to the second category and are known as mitzvot lo te'aseh (מצוות לא תעשה).

There are 248 positive mitzvot (mitzvot aseh) and 365 negative mitzvot (mitzvot lo te'aseh). It is told that the number of positive mitzvot represent the number of bones and significant organs in the human body, while the negative mitzvot corresponds to the number of days in a solar year.

== Punishment ==
In Jewish tradition, the punishment for failing to observe a commandment is often malkot. The basis for this can be found in Midrash Chazal (מדרשת חז"ל), which adheres to the principle of semukhim (סמיכות פרשיות).

An explanation for the malkot punishment is also explained in the book of Deuteronomy in chapter 25:

כִּי יִהְיֶה רִיב בֵּין אֲנָשִׁים, וְנִגְּשׁוּ אֶל הַמִּשְׁפָּט, וּשְׁפָטוּם: וְהִצְדִּיקוּ אֶת הַצַּדִּיק, וְהִרְשִׁיעוּ אֶת הָרָשָׁע. וְהָיָה אִם בִּן הַכּוֹת הָרָשָׁע, וְהִפִּילוֹ הַשֹּׁפֵט, וְהִכָּהוּ לְפָנָיו כְּדֵי רִשְׁעָתוֹ, בְּמִסְפָּר, אַרְבָּעִים יַכֶּנּוּ, לֹא יֹסִיף; פֶּן יֹסִיף לְהַכֹּתוֹ עַל אֵלֶּה מַכָּה רַבָּה, וְנִקְלָה אָחִיךָ לְעֵינֶיךָ.

— Deuteronomy, Chapter 25

In English NIV:

When people have a dispute, they are to take it to court and the judges will decide the case, acquitting the innocent and condemning the guilty. If the guilty person deserves to be beaten, the judge shall make them lie down and have them flogged in his presence with the number of lashes the crime deserves, but the judge must not impose more than forty lashes. If the guilty party is flogged more than that, your fellow Israelite will be degraded in your eyes.
