= Sabbath food preparation =

Preparation and handling of food before the Jewish day of rest

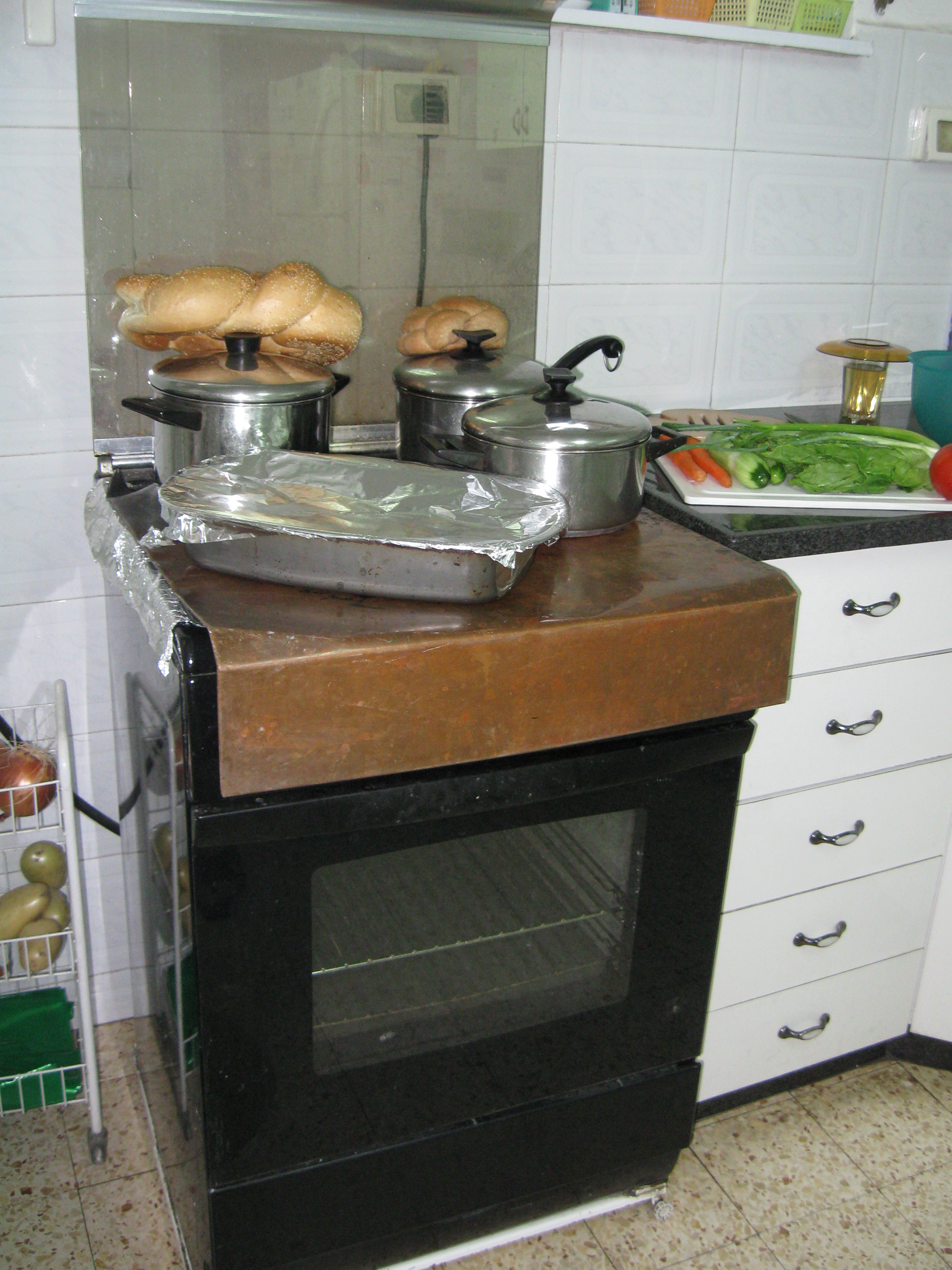
Items being kept hot on Shabbat

Sabbath food preparation refers to the preparation and handling of food before the Sabbath, (also called Shabbat, or the seventh day of the week) beginning at sundown Friday concluding at sundown Saturday, the Bible day of rest, when cooking, baking, and the kindling of a fire are prohibited by the Jewish law.

== Bishul versus cooking ==
One of the 39 prohibited activities on the Sabbath is bishul (Hebrew: בישול), or "cooking." However, bishul is not an exact equivalent of "cooking." The Hebrew term bishul as it relates to Shabbat is the "use of heat to alter the quality of an item," and this applies whether the heat is applied through baking, boiling, frying, roasting and most other types of cooking.

The prohibition of bishul applies to all types of food and drink, even to foods and drinks which are edible when raw or cold.

== Heat sources ==
Kli Rishon A kli rishon (כלי ראשון, "first vessel") is a vessel that was heated directly on a flame or other source of heat. Even when removed from the source of heat, this vessel maintains its status as a kli rishon, and possesses the capacity to enact bishul on any type of food placed within it. This capacity remains until the pot and its contents cool below the temperature of yad soledet bo (יד סולדת בו, the degree of heat "from which the hand recoils").

— Rabbi Simcha Bunin Cohen, The Shabbos Kitchen Mesorah Publications, Ltd. 1991, page 17

The prohibited activity of bishul is separate and distinct from that of havarah (הבערה, "kindling a fire"). Performing bishul with a pre-existing flame is forbidden on Shabbat The prohibition of bishul, however, is not limited to the use of fire as a heat source; it is forbidden to perform bishul with any source of heat, whether it be an actual flame, or an electric stove/range, a hot plate, an urn or a microwave oven. Moreover, placing food into a kli rishon may constitute bishul in certain instances. However using heat from the sun to cook is allowed on shabbat. (talmud shabbat 39a)

== Reheating foods ==
While it is prohibited in most instances to initially heat a food item to the temperature of yad soledet bo, foods that have already been fully cooked may sometimes be reheated. In terms of reheating, a distinction is made between dry foods and liquids.

Dry food that has been completely cooked is no longer subject to the prohibition of bishul; this is based on the principle of ain bishul achar bishul (אין בישול אחר בישול, "Cooking does not take effect after cooking"). Thus, a completely cooked, dry food item, such as a piece of chicken or potato kugel, may be reheated once it has been fully cooked.

However, there is a great dispute as to whether this rule applies to liquids: Maimonides, the Rashba and the Ran assert that liquids are in fact no different from solid dry foods, whereas Rashi, the Rosh and Rabbeinu Yonah assert that this rule does not apply and reheating of liquids is forbidden, applying the principle of yeish bishul achar bishul (יש בישול אחר בישול, "Cooking does take effect after cooking") to liquids. This prohibition of reheating liquids only applies when the liquid has completely cooled. If the liquid has only partially cooled and still retains enough heat to be enjoyed as the warm liquid as it was intended to be, it may be reheated by Ashkenazic Jews. For Sephardic Jews, it cannot be reheated if it has cooled beyond yad soledet bo.

Kli rishon, literally the first utensil, refers to a utensil that is used for cooking, baking or roasting food or liquid, and contains that hot food or liquid. When hot food or liquid is transferred from the kli rishon into a second utensil, this utensil is called a kli sheni. A kli shlishi is the third utensil into which hot food or liquid is transferred. The idea of Kli shlishi being less stringent than a Kli Sheni is not clear in the talmud or rishonim. All vessels that are no longer a Kli Rishon have the status of kli sheni as the status of a kli sheni is based on the fact that the heat is generated by the liquid within the vessel rather than by the walls of the vessel. In that regard Kli sheni and Kli shlishi etc. are exactly the same .

== Hot beverages ==
The problem of preparing hot beverages on Shabbat revolves around the temperature of the water. If the water is hot enough to cook the tea leaves, it would constitute malacha. Pouring straight from an urn (also considered a klei rishon) would cause the cooking of the substance. For a solid substance the outer and concrete layer will definitely be cooked (bishul kdai klipah), which would be malacha. For a liquid there is no concrete layer, and therefore no specific part that is being cooked. Therefore, it is ruled that a liquid is not considered cooked if it is not yad soledet bo or 113 °F (45 °C). A kos sheini can be used to bypass this problem.

Using a Kos sheini is acceptable because when the liquid is poured (Erui kos sheini) some of the heat is transferred into the atmosphere, and therefore the liquid loses some heat. Most people hold that this will not cause enough heat to be emitted and therefore the tea leaves will still be cooked. To lower the temperature of the water further people rule that a klei shlishi must be used. Once again in the pouring process (erui klei sheini) more heat is emitted and therefore some people hold that the tea will not be cooked and it is therefore permissible to make tea with this water. However, many other authorities hold that tea leaves fall under the category of items which cook easily (kalei habishul), even in the diminished heat of a kos shelishi. Consequently, those who are most scrupulous in their observance will prepare a concentrated tea extract before the Sabbath; as a liquid, water from a kos sheini can be added to the extract to heat it.

== Rabbinic prohibitions ==
In addition to the Biblical prohibition of cooking on Shabbat, there exist several related rabbinical prohibitions on Shabbat.

- Shehiyah is a prohibition on leaving uncooked food to cook on Shabbat on a lit stove or oven, lest one come to stir the coals on Shabbat to increase the strength of the flame.
- Hachzarah is a prohibition on returning cooked food to a lit stove or oven, either because this resembles cooking, or because it could lead one to stir the coals.
- Hatmanah is a prohibition on insulating food in certain ways in order to keep it warm, similar to the haybox.

== Fire safety ==
In 2015, a house fire killed seven children in Brooklyn, New York. The 2015 fire was preceded by at least four other Shabbat fires in Brooklyn in the past 15 years caused by appliances for heating food being left on or candles burning during the Jewish Sabbath in order to comply with Orthodox interpretation of Jewish law. In 2005, three children died in a fire in Williamsburg, Brooklyn, caused when stove burners were left on during Passover. After the 2015 fire, the New York City Fire Department distributed a pamphlet titled "Fire Safety for Jewish Observances" to nearby homes. In response to the fire, many Jews in Brooklyn purchased smoke detectors before the following Sabbath.

== See also ==
- Jewish cuisine
