= Osek b'mitzvah patur min hamitzvah =

In Judaism, the concept of Osek B'Mitzvah Patur Min Hamitzvah (Hebrew: עוסק במצוה פטור מן המצוה, rough lt. "engaged in commandment exempt from the commandment", or rather, in a more understandable translation, "one who is engaged in a commandment is exempt from another commandment [at the same time]") sometimes exempts one from performing a religious obligation while one is engrossed in another religious obligation.

== Sources ==
The Talmud cites Deuteronomy,

"...בְּשִׁבְתְּךָ בְּבֵיתֶךָ וּבְלֶכְתְּךָ בַדֶּרֶךְ..."
"...when you sit in your house and when you travel on your way..."

and infers from the reference to your way that commandments are not obligatory when one is already engaged in heavenly pursuits.

== Extensions of the Rule ==
The Talmud makes use of a similar concept in reference to those who are not yet actively engaged in a mitzvah (commandment) but also to those who are busy preparing to perform a mitzvah, with the comment that שלוחי מצוה (shluchei mitzvah, lit. "messengers of a precept") are similarly exempt from performing other religious obligations, such as sitting in a sukkah.

The Pnei Yehoshua comments that such exemptions are valid only for positive commandments, stating that one thoroughly engaged in a positive precept (such as burying the dead or learning Torah) would certainly not enable one to violate negative precepts (such as performing adultery or consuming non-kosher food).
