= Adoption in Judaism =

Adoption does not exist formally as a practice in Jewish Law (Halacha), although rabbinic texts were not uniform on whether or not they recognized the validity of adoption and several examples of adoption take place in the Hebrew Bible and texts from the Second Temple Judaism. The Hebrew word for adoption ‘אימוץ’ (immutz), which derives from the verb ‘אמץ’ (amatz) in Psalm 80 verse 16 and 18 meaning ‘to make strong’, was not introduced until the modern age. Jewish perspectives towards adoption promote two contradictory messages towards nurture and nature. On the one hand, Judaism expresses favourable attitudes towards adoption across religious movements and is widely viewed as a good deed (mitzvah). Based on the Talmudic teachings that when one raises an orphan in their home, "scripture ascribes it to him as though he had begotten him," rabbis have argued that the commandment of procreation can also be fulfilled through the act of adoption. However, this interpretation raises a number of questions in relation to lineage and biological status, which is a core value in Halacha.

Adoption that is practiced in modern secular society derives from Roman law. The secular procedure for adoption involves the removal of all rights and responsibilities from the biological parents, which are then transferred onto the adoptive parent/s. Judaism contrasts to Roman law, in that the adoptive parents do not entirely replace the role of the biological parents. Jewish Law aligns closer with British common law, within which the importance of royal bloodlines and class meant that an adoption procedure was never introduced. Similarly, in Judaism, genealogy determines the status of the child, which cannot be removed by a legal procedure.

== Biblical references to adoption ==
The term for adoption did not exist in the Hebrew language until modern times. As such, there are no explicit mentions of the word ‘adoption’ in the Torah or Talmud. However, there are several verses that are regarded as describing something akin to adoption.

=== Genesis ===
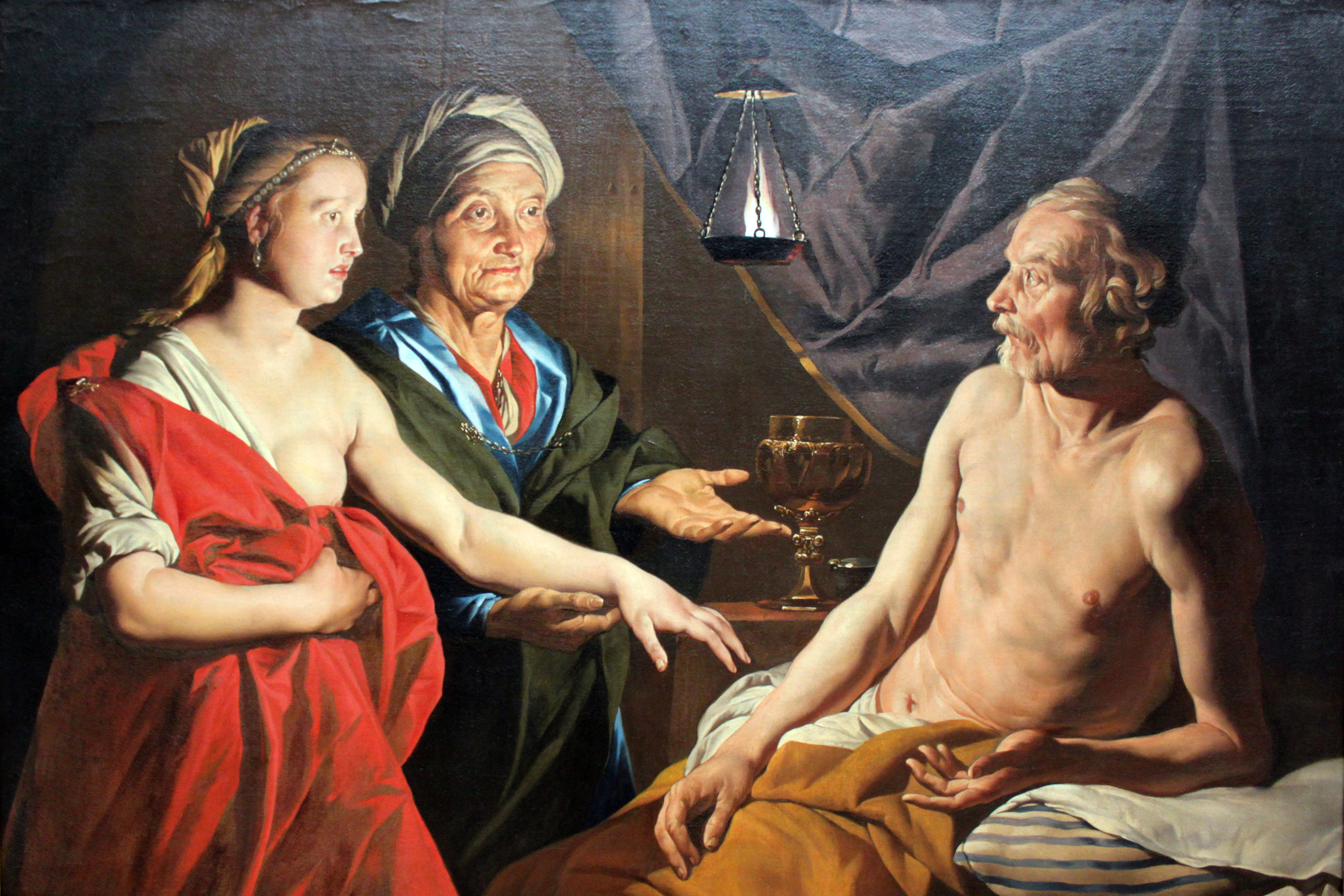
Sarah presenting Hagar to Abraham. Painting from 1638

In Genesis 15:2–3, Abraham expressed his concerns to God regarding the nature of his inheritance, given that his wife Sarah was barren and he was childless. In this verse, Abraham contemplated ‘adopting’ his servant Eliezer to be his future heir:

But Abram said, "O Lord God, what can You give me, seeing that I shall die childless, and the one in charge of my household is Dammesek Eliezer!" Abram said further, "Since You have granted me no offspring, my steward will be my heir".

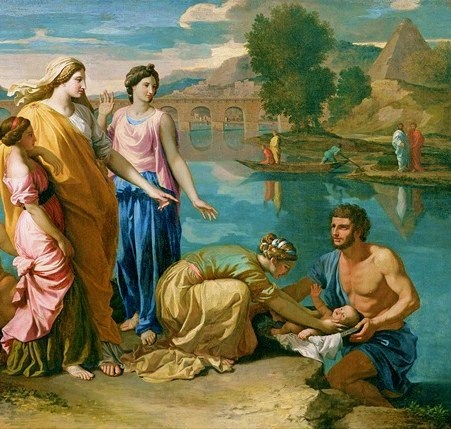
Moses being rescued from the Nile. Painting from 1638

In Genesis 16:2 Sarah offered her maidservant, Hagar, to her husband Abraham as a mistress, with whom he could have children that she would raise as her own. Jacob's wife Rachel had also been experiencing barrenness, and in Genesis (30:3), just as Sarah did with Abraham, Rachel gave her maidservant, Bilhah, to her husband Jacob, in order to have children. In this verse, the act of Bilhah giving birth onto Rachel's knees is said to signify legitimisation, resembling an ancient adoption ceremony practiced by European and Asiatic people.

Here is my maid Bilhah. Consort with her, that she may bear on my knees and that through her I too may have children.

In Genesis 48:5–6, Jacob adopts his grandsons (Joseph's sons Ephraim and Menashe) and gives them both a share in his inheritance.

"Now, your two sons, who were born to you in the land of Egypt before I came to you in Egypt, shall be mine; Ephraim and Manasseh shall be mine no less than Reuben and Simeon. But progeny born to you after them shall be yours"

=== Exodus ===
In Exodus 2:9–10, Moses was rescued from the banks of the River Nile by Pharaoh's daughter Batyah, who then raised him as her own in the house of Pharaoh.

And Pharaoh's daughter said to her, ‘Take this child and nurse it for me, and I will pay your wages.’ So the woman took the child and nursed it. When the child grew up, she brought him to Pharaoh's daughter, who made him her son.

=== Esther ===
In Esther 2:7, Mordecai provided a home for and raised his orphaned cousin Esther. While some sources interpret this as foster parenting, the phrase ‘took her, to himself, as a daughter’ is historically interpreted as being a form of adoption

And [Mordecai] was raising Hadassah (that is, Esther) daughter of his uncle for she had no father or mother . . . and when her father and her mother died Mordechai took her, to himself, as a daughter.

=== 2 Samuel ===
In 2 Samuel (6:23) it was established that Michal, the wife of King David, never had children throughout her entire life. "To her dying day Michal daughter of Saul had no children" (2 Samuel 6:23). However, later in the book (2 Samuel 21:8) there is a mention of her five sons. In response to this discrepancy, the Talmud poses an idea similar to adoption; suggesting that her sister Merab gave birth to the children, but Michal was the one who raised them, and they therefore belonged to her.

Her sister Merab gave birth to them and she raised them, therefore they are called by her name. This teaches that whoever brings up an orphan in his home is regarded, according to Scripture, as though the child had been born to him.

== Adoption of a Jewish child ==
Whilst Judaism does recognise adoption as the "spiritual equivalent of procreation", adoptive parents do not entirely replace the biological parents. In Jewish law, biological parents determine the child's identity.

If the birthmother is Jewish, this means that the child is also Jewish. In this case, the Jewish biological father then determines the child's tribal status as either a Kohen, Levite or Yisrael. If the child is born a Kohen, he must accept the priestly obligations that accompany this status, whether or not the adoptive father is also a Kohen. Biological parents also determine whether a child requires a ‘Pidyon Haben’ (redemption of the first born). This is a ceremony that takes place when a Jewish woman has a natural birth of a firstborn male, and neither of the biological parents are descendants of Kohanim or Levites. If a couple who has already adopted a boy later gives birth to another boy by natural means, the 'Pidyon Haben' will need to take place for their second child.

A common concern when adopting a Jewish-born child is whether the pregnancy has occurred as a result of incest or adultery. Should this be the case, the child is considered illegitimate and takes on the status of a mamzer. Jewish law forbids a mamzer from marrying another Jew of legitimate birth, which is the majority of the Jewish community.

In Judaism, definitions of incest refer only to the biological family, and not the adoptive family. Therefore, although discouraged, an adopted child is permitted to marry another person from their adoptive family, since they are not blood relatives.

== Adoption of a non-Jewish child ==
In Orthodox and Conservative streams of Judaism, if the birthmother is gentile, this means that the child is born not-Jewish. Jewish families adopting a non-Jewish child require a formal conversion ceremony. The formal requirements for a valid conversion include; the presence of three Rabbis in order to form a ‘Beth Din’, an immersion in a ritual bath (mikvah), and a ceremonial circumcision for all males (Brit Milah).

A conversion serves as a 'symbolic rebirth' and therefore there are no legitimacy concerns as with Jewish-born children. However, there are issues that can arise when Rabbis from various religious movements differ on their requirements for conversion. Many Orthodox Rabbis will only permit the conversion of a non-Jewish child if the adopted parents are observant Jews. In many communities, Orthodox Rabbis have control over access to the mikvah, and can thereby prevent non-Orthodox rabbis from performing non-Orthodox conversions. Whilst some Reform and Reconstructionist Rabbis will allow conversion without immersion in the mikvah by performing a naming ceremony, adopted children who have not been properly converted will face difficulties in the future should they choose to join a Conservative synagogue, marry a more traditional Jew, or move to Israel.

Jewish names are patronymic, and for converts, the issue arises whether they can use their adoptive father's name. While other denominations allow this, Orthodox Judaism forbids it, maintaining that the convert should be called ‘ben Avraham Avinu’ (the son of our father Abraham). Halachic regulation, directly from Ezekiel 44, also prohibits a converted girl from marrying a man that is a Kohen.

== Open and closed adoptions ==
Suppressing the identity of the biological parents through closed adoptions is forbidden under Jewish Law. Closed adoptions make it difficult to establish the child's legitimacy and whether or not they are a mamzer.^{5} Therefore, in order to allow the marriage of an adopted child to another Jew of legitimate birth, their lineage (yichus) must be identifiable^{8}.

Another concern of Halachic authorities is that closed adoptions create the potential for incestuous marriages between Jewish biological siblings who have been separated at birth, consequently leading to the birth of illegitimate children within the Jewish community.

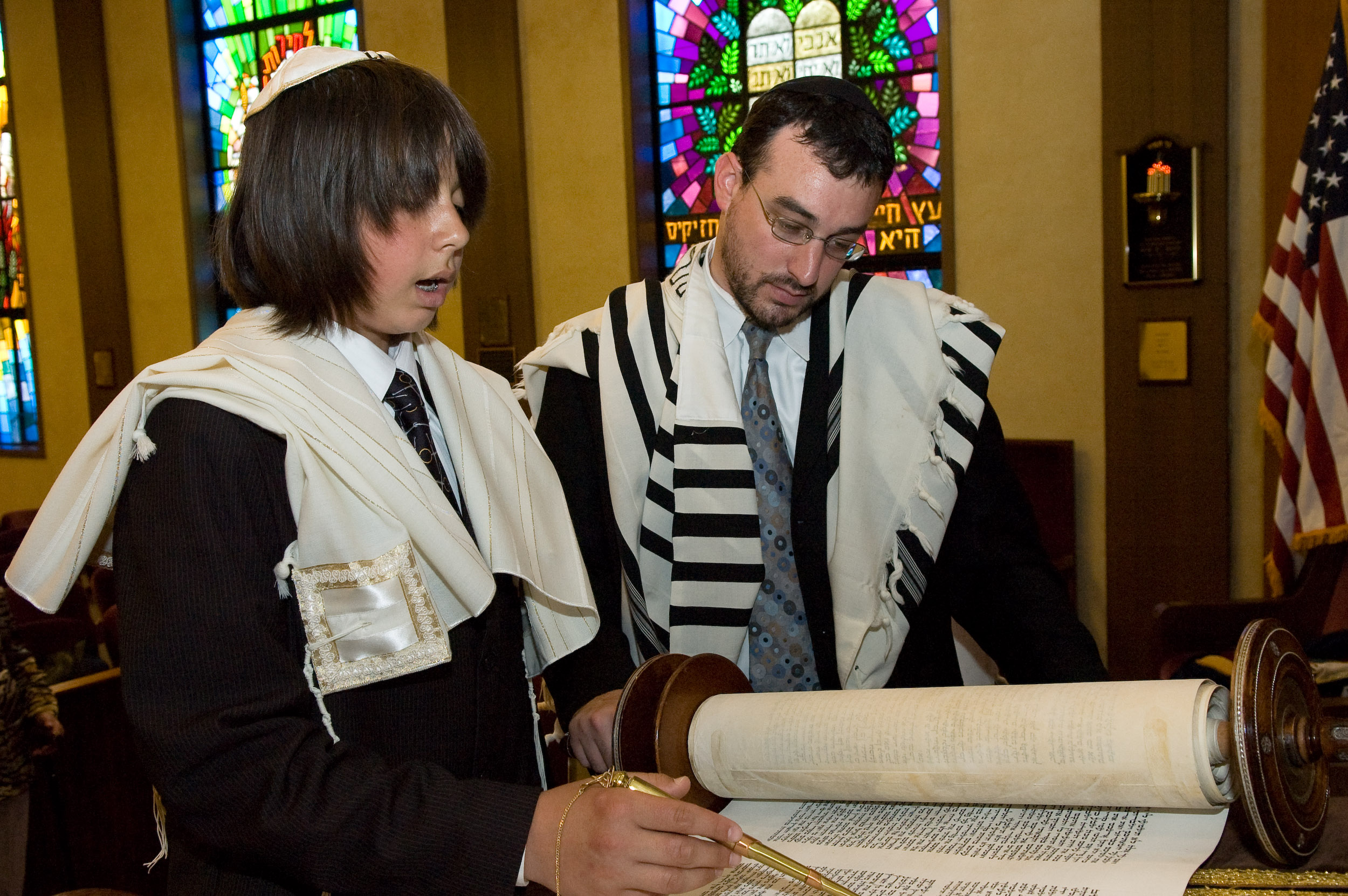
Bar mitzvah

This condition of knowing one's biological parents can be fulfilled without actually having to reveal their identity to the child. The adopted child can entrust another person with a private record of the identity of their birthparents. Before entering into a marriage, the adopted child must consult this person, to ensure there is no possibility of a forbidden union.

According to Jewish Law, a non-Jewish child must be informed that they have been adopted and also converted to Judaism. The Talmud gives permission to Rabbis to convert a child before the age of consent, based on the principle that ‘‘we can act to someone's advantage even without their permission’". However, at the age of bar/bat mitzvah, the child has the right to either reaffirm or protest the conversion; and open adoptions are thereby essential to this practice.

In Judaism, a convert also has certain restrictions on who they are allowed to marry. Converted girls are prohibited in Orthodox communities from marrying a Kohen, and therefore they should know of their status. The sole exception is of female non-Jewish infants converted Halachically before they reach the age of 3 years and one day, from their birth date. This mitigates the invalidating status of a Giyyoret being subsumed under the Passul Halachic status of being "be-ḥezkat zona", and hence ensuring her being under the Halachically Kosher status of "be-ḥezkat betulla", and as a result, fully eligible to marry a Kohen.

== Yichud ==
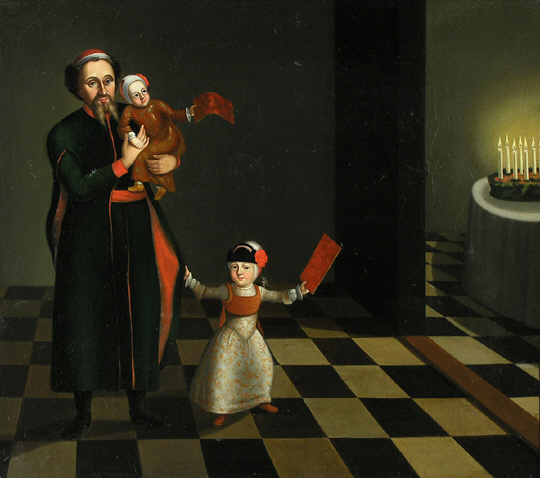
Yichud with one's own children is legitimate, but if they are adopted, restrictions apply. 18th-century painting

Yichud (Jewish chastity law) forbids people of the opposite sex who are not biologically related, from being alone in a room together or from touching each other. For Orthodox Jews, this creates difficulties for adoptive parents with children of the opposite sex. The prohibition of touching restricts a parent's ability to nurture their child as it prevents them from hugging and kissing, both of which are part of building healthy familial relationships.

Counter propositions made by notable contemporary Rabbis argue that there are grounds for leniency towards the rules of Yichud in the case of adoption. Rabbi Eliezer Waldenburg, said that adoption should take place at a young age before the limitations of Yichud apply. For a girl this is age three and for a boy this is age nine. However, according to this view, an older child may not be adopted unless all the laws of Yichud are observed. Rabbi Moshe Feinstein said that the physical contact between adopted children and their parents is not sexual, and therefore the laws of Yichud do not apply in the context of adoption. However, he limits his leniency to when both adoptive parents are alive, married to each other and living in one home; for example an adoptive father may not touch or be alone with his adopted daughter, if his wife has passed away.

Many Poskim, most notably Rabbi Menachem Mendel Schneerson (the Lubavitcher Rebbe), strongly contest this leniency. Many Orthodox Rabbis have listed Yichud as another concern why Jewish Law forbids closed adoptions; as adopted children could unintentionally violate the laws of seclusion and physical contact due to being unaware of their adoptive status.

== Nature vs. nurture ==
The Jewish perspective towards adoption presents a contradiction between nature and nurture, in terms of the role of the biological and adoptive parent.

On the one hand, many rabbinic authorities consider adoption as a way of fulfilling the commandment "be fruitful and multiply" for those who physically cannot. They recognise that the purpose of procreation is not just giving birth, but also raising a child and passing on Jewish values. Classical Talmudic teachings suggest that the one who raises and teaches the child their values, culture and religion takes precedence over the role of the genetic parent.

"His teacher takes priority for his father brought him into this world but his teacher who taught him wisdom brings him into the world to come"

— Bava Metzia 2:11

On the other hand, according to Halacha, a child's legal identity is determined at the moment birth based on the status of the biological parents. Given the importance of lineage to the Jewish tradition, Jewish law has never developed a formal legal procedure for adoption. Unlike secular adoption, the relationship between the child and biological parents is never severed, and adoptive parents therefore cannot entirely replace the role of the biological parent. When a biological parent passes away, the child must fulfil the commandment to honour them by mourning their death, even if they were adopted. In comparison, it is not an obligation for an adopted child to mourn the death of their adoptive parents. An adopted son does not legally carry on the name of his adoptive father, and therefore in the case of the adoptive father's death, without another biological child, the man would have been considered childless.

== Adoption in Israel ==
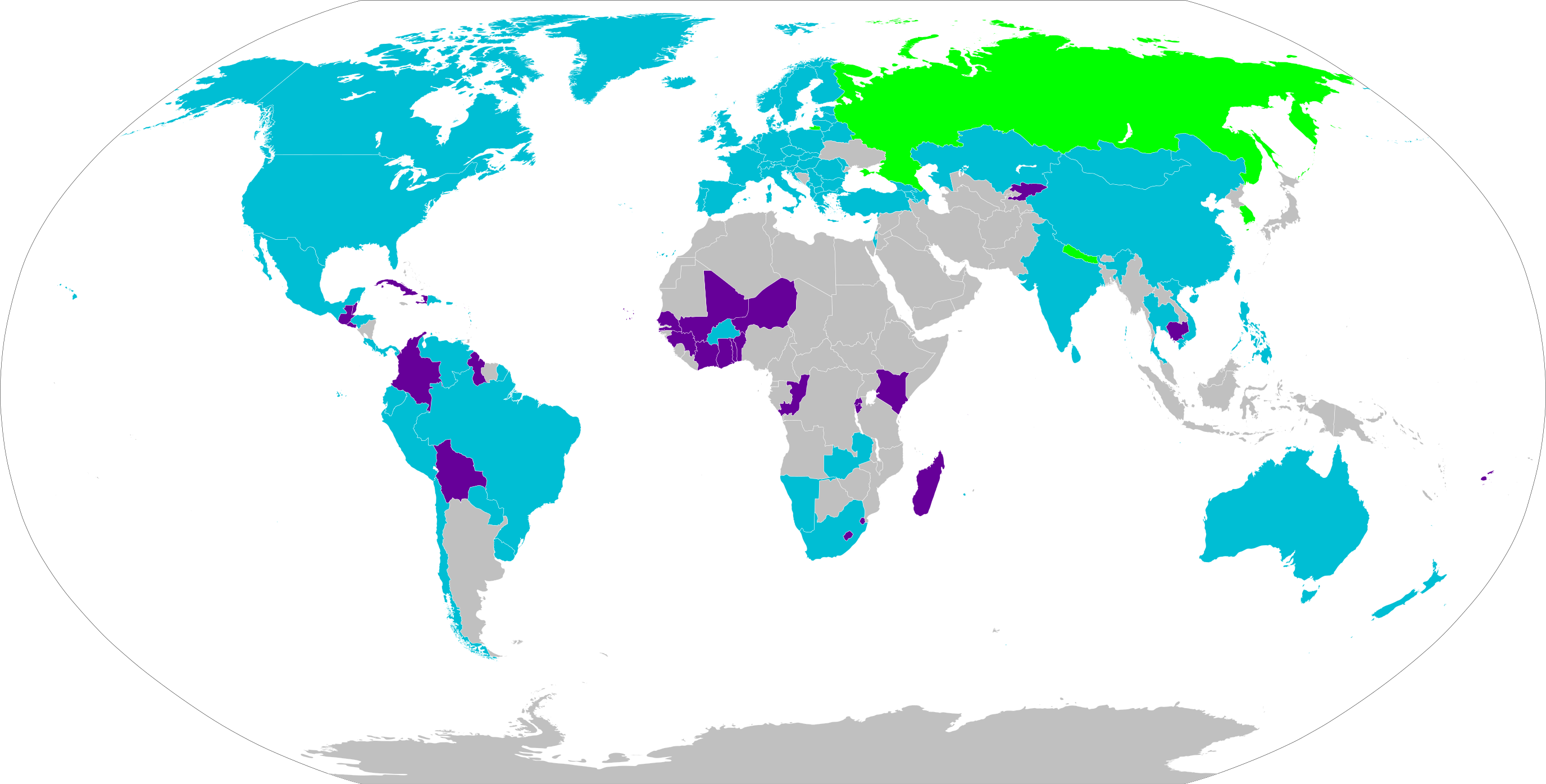
Map of Hague Adoption Convention (blue members, purple non-members, green signatures to the convention)

Given that Israel is the nation state of the Jewish People, Jewish law has impacted the development of its secular laws; and that does not exclude adoption. Israel's 'Adoption of Children Law' was introduced by the Knesset in 1960. This law created a compromise between Halacha and the secular legal system, in that it had the effect of legally severing the relationship between biological parents and children, in accordance with Roman law, without interfering in the religious laws regarding the prohibition and permission of marriage and divorce. The law also pertained that there was to be no adoption of a person over the age of 18, and that the prospective adopter needed to be at least 18 years older than the adoptee.

In 1981, the 'Adoption of Children Law' was updated to contain the religious matching clause in Section 5. This clause stipulated that the adopter must be the same religion as the adoptee. This made it difficult for a predominately Jewish population in Israel to adopt children internationally.

In 1993, Israel ratified the 'Hague Adoption Convention' and as such, the state's laws changed to align with the requirements of this convention. The legislature also resolved the previous issue regarding adoption of the same religion by amending section 13A of the 'Capacity and Guardianship Law'. This led to an increase in adoption from overseas, with 2056 adopted children entering the state of Israel between 1998 and 2007.
