= Makkot =

Tractate of the Mishnah and Talmud

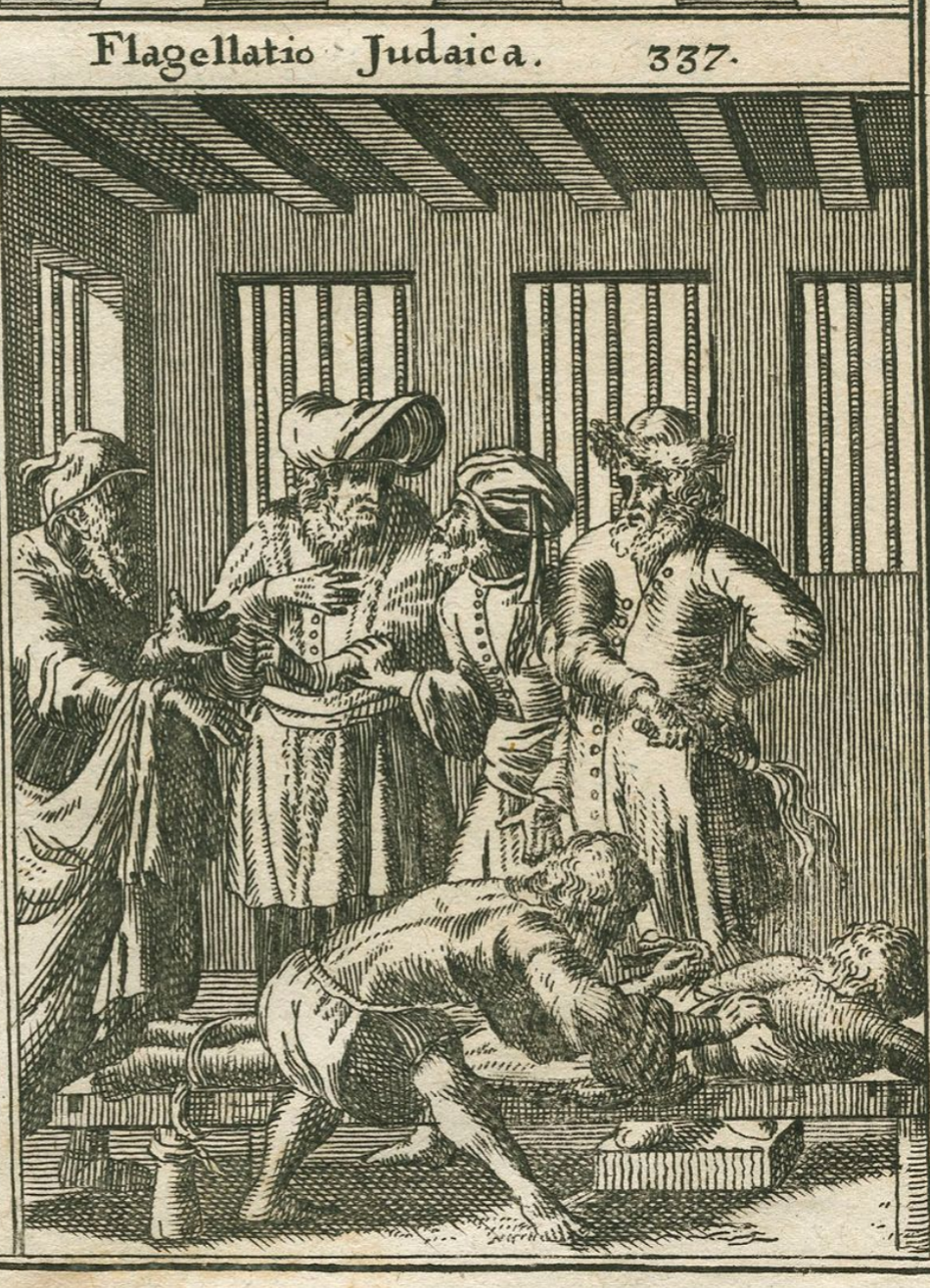
Engraving of makkot (1657)

Makkot (Hebrew: מַכּוֹת, romanized: Makkoṯ, lit. 'Lashes') is a tractate of the Mishnah and Talmud. It is the fifth volume of the order of Nezikin. Makkot deals primarily with laws of the beth din (halakhic courts) and the punishments which they may administer and may be regarded as a continuation of tractate Sanhedrin, of which it originally formed part.

In its scope of application are the topics of:

- False witnesses (edim zomemim);
- Exiles in a city of refuge (aray miklat); and
- The lashes administered by the beth din (makkot).

The third chapter of Makkot enumerates 59 offenses, each entailing lashes (Malkot). Of these, three are marital sins of priests; four, prohibited intermarriages; seven, sexual relations of an incestuous nature; eight, violations of dietary laws; twelve, various breaches of the negative precepts; twenty-five, abuses of Levitical statutes and vows. When the offense persists, the punishment depends on the number of forewarnings (see ''hatra'ah''). The Mishnah gives 39 as the maximum number of stripes the court may impose for any one misdemeanor, but the convict must be examined as to their physical ability to endure the full count without endangering their life. The convict is bound in a bent position to a post, and the public executioner administers the punishment with a leather strap while one of the judges recites appropriate scriptural verses: Deuteronomy 28:58–59 and 29:8 and Psalm 78:38. Anyone guilty of a sin which is punished by kareth ("excision") may be cleared by flagellation. The author of this midrash, Hanina ben Gamaliel, adds, "If by the commission of a sin one forfeits his soul before God, so much the more reason is there for the belief that, by a meritorious deed, such as voluntary submission to punishment, his soul is saved."
