= Violence begets violence =

Aphorism used by Martin Luther King Jr.

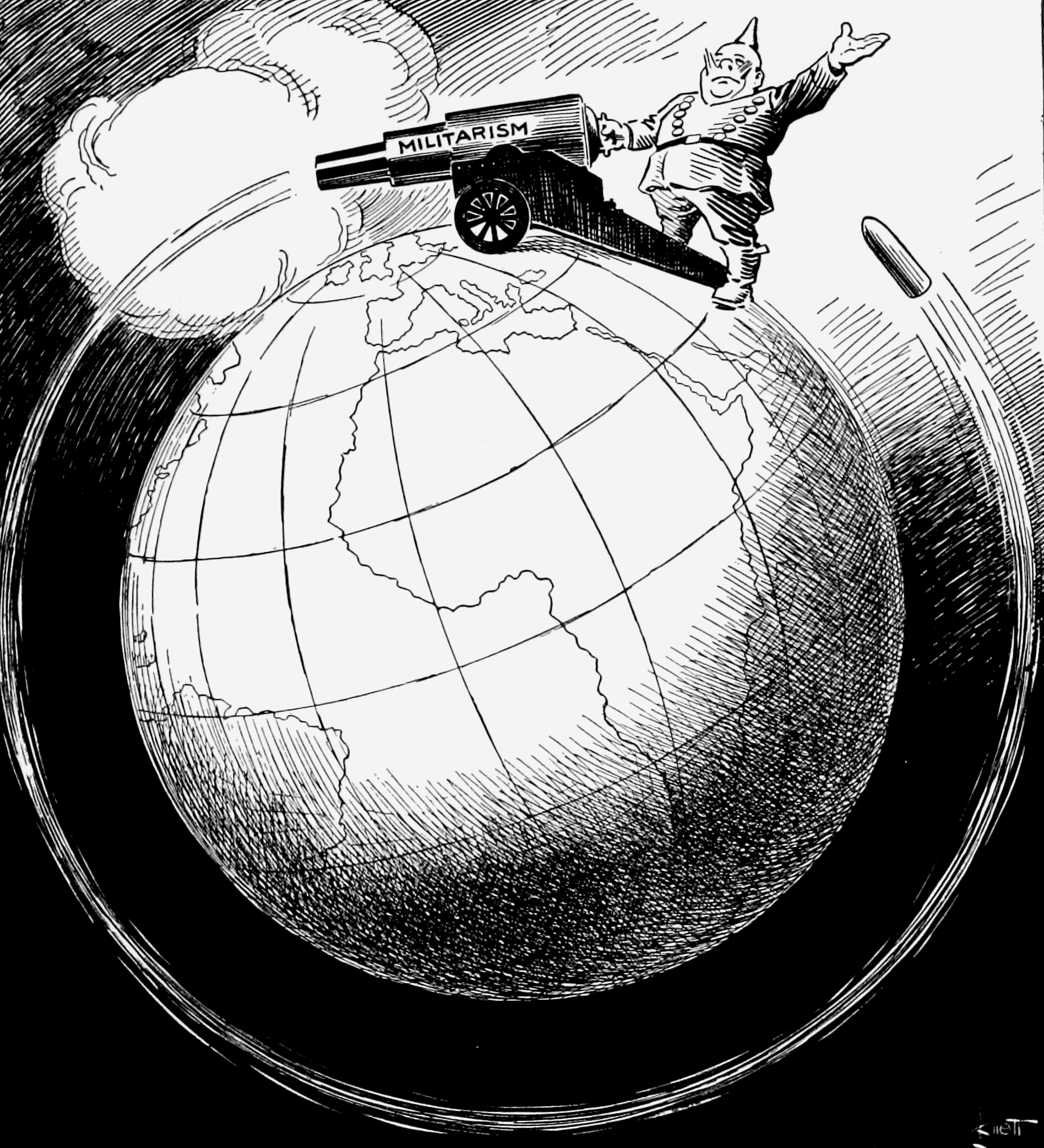
It Shoots Further Than He Dreams by John F. Knott, March 1918

The phrase "violence begets violence" (or "hate begets hate") means that violent behavior promotes other violent behavior in return. The phrase has been used since the early 19th century.

Violence begets violence is a concept described in the Gospel of Matthew, verse 26:52. The passage depicts a disciple (identified in the Gospel of John as Peter) drawing a sword to defend against the arrest of Jesus but being told to sheath his weapon:

"Put your sword back in its place," Jesus said to him, "for all who draw the sword will die by the sword."

== Words by Martin Luther King Jr. ==
Martin Luther King Jr. (1929–1968) used the phrase when saying:

Hate begets hate; violence begets violence; toughness begets a greater toughness. We must meet the forces of hate with the power of love... Our aim must never be to defeat or humiliate the white man, but to win his friendship and understanding.

The ultimate weakness of violence is that it is a descending spiral begetting the very thing it seeks to destroy, instead of diminishing evil, it multiplies it. Through violence you may murder the liar, but you cannot murder the lie, nor establish the truth. Through violence you may murder the hater, but you do not murder hate. In fact, violence merely increases hate. Returning violence for violence multiplies violence, adding deeper darkness to a night already devoid of stars. Darkness cannot drive out darkness; only light can do that. Hate cannot drive out hate; only love can do that.

== See also ==
- Christian anarchism
- Cycle of violence
- Turning the other cheek
- Mitzvah goreret mitzvah
- Blowback
- Security dilemma
