= Malkot (Judaism) =

Type of flagellation and punishment mentioned in the Torah

Malkot (Hebrew: מלקות, lit. 'whipping'), sometimes translated as "flogging" or "lashes", is a type of flagellation, and a punishment mentioned in the Torah. The punishment was given to Jews who violated one of Mitzvah's lo te'aseh bemeizid.

The laws of Malkot can be found in Masekhet Makkot.

== Torah ==
Malkot originates as a form of court-administered punishment in Deuteronomy 25:1–3:

When people have a dispute, they are to take it to court and the judges will decide the case, acquitting the innocent and condemning the guilty. If the guilty person deserves to be beaten, the judge shall make them lie down and have them flogged in his presence with the number of lashes the crime deserves, but the judge must not impose more than forty lashes. If the guilty party is flogged more than that, your fellow Israelite will be degraded in your eyes.

In the text, a judge may impose up to forty stripes as punishment, but no more, explicitly to preserve the offender's dignity. This reflects an ethical concern that an offender remain "your brother" – i.e. a fellow Israelite – and not be dehumanized by excessive beating. Biblical law envisioned flogging as a corrective measure rather than vengeance, even describing God as disciplining Israel "as a man chastises his son". Aside from a specific case (a slanderer of a virgin, who is fined and flogged per Deut. 22:18), the Torah does not tie lashes to particular crimes. Instead, malkot is presented as a general punishment where no other penalty (such as execution or restitution) is prescribed. Flogging was the default punishment for many offenses in biblical justice. The maximum of 40 lashes was intended as a ceiling, with judges expected to adjust the number "according to [the offender's] crime" (Deut. 25:2) without ever exceeding forty. This cap aimed to prevent cruelty or humiliation in punishment. Later Jewish tradition interpreted "the number of forty" to mean forty minus one – i.e. 39 – to ensure the Torah's command would never be accidentally violated.

== Talmud ==
During the Second Temple period, malkot was a functioning penalty in Jewish courts (the Sanhedrin and local courts). For example, the New Testament records Paul stating, "Five times I received from the Jews the forty lashes minus one" (2 Corinthians 11:24) – evidence that first-century Jewish tribunals administered the standard 39 lashes for serious offenses. The Mishnah (Tractate Makkot, literally "Blows") and Talmud preserved detailed laws on flogging, formalizing how lashes were to be carried out and for which sins. Rabbinic law fixed the standard penalty at 39 lashes (referred to as "forty less one") for each conviction requiring flogging. This reduction from the biblical forty was a "fence around the Torah" to avoid any chance of exceeding the limit. The sages debated the interpretation – a minority (Rabbi Judah) held that a full forty could be given – but the accepted halakhah followed 39 as the maximum in practice. The Mishnah specifies the procedure: "How many lashes do we give him? Forty less one, as it is said (Deut. 25:2–3)…".

There are 207 violations that could result in Malkot. Offenses liable to lashes were defined such that any willful violation of a Torah negative commandment without a stricter penalty (and committed by an overt act) could incur malkot. This included transgressions carrying the divine punishment of karet (spiritual excision), which rabbinic courts would punish with lashes if proper witnesses were present. However, offenses that also required monetary restitution (e.g. theft) or were capital crimes were excluded – one could not be both fined or executed and also flogged for the same act. If a prohibition was "mitigated" by a positive command (for example, the law to release a mother bird after taking her chicks), then fulfilling the positive command spared the offender from lashes. Thus, malkot became applied only to specific violations of Torah law.

The procedure for malkot was carried out with great care for the convict's health and dignity. The Talmud describes how the convict was tied in a bent-over position for flogging, and the lashes were delivered with a special leather whip. Two-thirds of the blows were applied to the person's back and one-third to the chest, according to tradition. The court would tailor the number of lashes to the individual's capacity. Before flogging, a physician (or examiner) assessed how many lashes the person could safely endure, based on age and constitution, if any. The number would always be divisible by 3, because lashes were given in groups of 3. This rule derived from the Torah's injunction "lest your brother be degraded", which the rabbis understood as a prohibition on allowing discretion to "the judges, who may tend to harshness or cruelty". Likewise, if during the flogging the convict showed signs of collapse, the punishment was halted immediately. The instrument used is described in rabbinic sources as a leather strap made of calfskin, doubled and redoubled, to ensure a broad, flat impact. The executioner (usually the court attendant) administered the lashes while another judge recited biblical verses such as "And He (God) being merciful, forgives iniquity…" (Ps. 78:38).

Theological and ethical interpretations of malkot in rabbinic literature underscore its merciful purpose. The sages taught that while being judged the offender is called "wicked," "once he is flogged he is entirely and completely your brother, as his sin has been atoned and he is no longer excised from the Jewish people". In other words, the punishment achieves atonement; after lashes, the sinner is rehabilitated and welcomed back into the community. The Torah's mandate "do not exceed" also influenced broader ethics: the Talmud derives from it a general ban on hitting another person, since "if it is forbidden to give even one extra extra lash to a wicked person, all the more so must it be forbidden to hit an innocent person, who is deserving of no lashes whatsoever". According to Hebrew teachings, Malkot cannot prevent a punishment that is yet to come afterlife.

== Medieval codifications ==
After the close of the Talmud, the classical system of malkot continued to influence Jewish communal law, though its practical use evolved. Formal Torah-court floggings waned after antiquity, especially as the prerequisite of authentic semikhah (ordination lineage from Moses) lapsed – meaning Jewish courts in exile technically lacked authority to impose biblically ordained lashes. Nonetheless, rabbinic authorities developed the concept of makkat mardut (literally "rebellion lashes"), a form of discretionary corporal punishment for the sake of enforcement and discipline. This innovation allowed post-Talmudic courts to administer flogging in cases that did not fit the strict Talmudic criteria or when formal evidence was insufficient, in order to uphold communal norms (takkanot) and religious observance. For example, one who refused to comply with a positive commandment (such as refusing to give his wife a divorce, or to build a sukkah) could be flogged until he complied. The Talmud said if a man stubbornly refuses to perform certain mitzvot, "he is flogged until his soul departs" (i.e. until he either complies or dies in extreme cases). In practice, medieval Jewish courts used this threat of indefinite lashes sparingly, but it underscored that corporal force was permitted to coerce obedience (as in Maimonides' ruling to beat a recalcitrant husband until he consents to grant a divorce).

Maimonides (Rambam) systematized the laws of malkot in his writings. In Mishneh Torah, Maimonides details the flogging procedure much as the Talmud described: the convict is assessed for stamina, given up to 39 lashes accordingly, and not one more. He emphasizes that a judge who orders even a single lash beyond what the person can bear violates a negative commandment of the Torah. Maimonides also codifies makkat mardut as a tool for enforcing rabbinic decrees or compelling performance of positive commandments (e.g. forcing one to fulfill a court order). The Shulchan Aruch (16th-century code) likewise reiterates these principles and even records the custom to administer 39 symbolic lashes on the eve of Yom Kippur as a form of personal atonement.

== Modern day ==
Today, flogging is still done ritually in Yom Kippur ceremonies, but not otherwise.
