= Siege of Gush Halav =

Roman siege during the First Jewish-Roman War (67 CE)

- Part of the Galilee campaign (67) of the First Jewish-Roman War
Date	Summer 67 CE
Location	Giscala, Galilee, Roman Judea
Result	Roman victory

Belligerents
Zealots	Roman Empire

Commanders and leaders
John of Giscala	Titus Flavius

The siege of Gush Halav refers to the Roman siege and sack of the fortified Galilean town of Gush Halav (Gischala, modern Jish), during the First Jewish–Roman War. Following the flight of the main Zealot fighting force from the town, the Romans took it by force.

== Background ==
Both Josephus and later Jewish sources from the Roman-Byzantine period mention the fine olive oil for which the village was known. According to the Talmud, the inhabitants also engaged in the production of silk.

Gischala was the home of Yohanan Ben-Levi of Gush Halav, better known as John of Giscala, a wealthy olive oil merchant who became a chief Zealot commander in the Jewish revolt in the Galilee and later Jerusalem. According to Josephus, John of Giscala was eager for rebellion and upgraded the town's fortifications. In one account Josephus writes that John fortified the town on Josephus' instructions, but in another he writes that John was hostile to the main Judean government, which Josephus represented in the Galilee, and undertook the fortifications at his own expense. Josephus includes the town in the list of 17 strategic fortifications undertaken in the wake of the revolt, suggesting the high importance of Gush Halav as a military fortress.

After the fall of Gamla and Jotapata in 67, Gush Halav was the last Jewish stronghold in the Galilee and Golan region during northern phase of the revolt.

== Siege ==
As part of the Roman campaign to suppress the revolt, Titus marched on Gush Halav. Giscala was the last town in Galilee not yet conquered. Initially known as a moderate, John changed his stance when Titus arrived at the gates of Gischala accompanied by 1,000 horsemen and demanded the town's surrender.

John prevailed upon Titus not to enter the city that day, as it was the Sabbath, "not so much out of regard to the seventh day as to his own preservation." John fled to Jerusalem that night, and "Titus was greatly displeased that he had not been able to bring this John, who had deluded him, to punishment."

== See also ==
- Siege of Yodfat
