= Toch k'dei dibur =

Principle in Jewish law

The Hebrew phrase tokh k'dei dibur (תוך כדי דיבור, "within [time] sufficient for speech") is a principle in Jewish law that governs the immediacy with which one must speak words for them to be considered a continuation of what has been stated just prior.

The period of toch k'dei dibur is equivalent to the time necessary to say the words Shalom alecha rebbi (שלום עליך רבי, "Peace unto you, my teacher"), which is somewhat less than three seconds. Mishnah Brurah 206:12, although the Taz adds the word u'mori (ומורי, "and my master"), which would lengthen the permitted window of opportunity.

== Practical example ==
Prior to consuming any food or beverage, a Jew must recite a blessing to express his or her gratitude to God for providing sustenance, (B.Berachot 35a) and there are different blessings for different types of food.

If for instance, an individual was just about to take a bite from a carrot, for which the blessing ends Borei Pri Ha'adamah (בורא פרי האדמה, "...the creator of fruits of ground") but instead, erroneously concluded the blessing that applies to fruit, bore pri ha'etz (בורא פרי העץ, "...the creator of fruits of the tree"), correcting the final part of the blessing to the appropriate conclusion toch k'dei dibur (i.e. within the allotted 3-second window of time), the error would thus be resolved.
