= Ikar v'tafel =

Principle in Jewish law

Ikar v'tafel (Hebrew: עיקר וטפל, lit. 'primary and secondary') is a principle in Jewish law that governs the proper blessing that is assigned to any particular food prior to consumption.

== Overview ==
Prior to consuming any food or beverage, a Jew must recite a blessing to express his or her gratitude to God for providing sustenance; additionally, because the entire world is believed to be in the possession of the Almighty, specific praise must be offered to God prior to deriving benefit.

There are different blessings for each of the different halachic food groups:

- bread
- other grain products
- wine and grape juice
- fruit and nuts
- vegetables
- all other foods and drinks

When an individual eats two foods together, one of which is primary and the other of which is subsidiary to it, only one blessing is recited, as stated in B.Mishna Berachot 6:7, "Whenever a primary food [ikar] is accompanied by a subsidiary food [tafel], the blessing is recited on the primary food, exempting the subsidiary food."

While the laws governing this principle are complex, some of its basic rules are straightforward. It pertains only to foods eaten in a combined form. One who has a cookie and tea must make two blessings, one on each of the items. It is when one is eating something akin to apple pie, beef stew or stuffed cabbage, which are foods consisting of multiple parts (crust and pie, beef and potatoes or meat and cabbage, respectively) that the principle of ikar v'tafel is applied (Aruch Hashulchan 212:1, 2).
