= Mitzvah goreret mitzvah =

(im)moral acts lead to more like them

The Hebrew phrase mitzvah goreret mitzvah, averah goreret averah (Hebrew: מצווה גוררת מצווה, עברה גוררת עברה; "one good deed will bring another good deed, one transgression will bring another transgression") expresses the belief in Judaism that following one commandment leads to another. The saying is found in the mishnah in Pirkei Avot 4:2.

There are several ways in which such an effect can take place. One can be as a result of inspiration, in which the act of a mitzvah is witnessed by others, who in turn, follow in their footsteps. Another is by habit, in which a person becomes accustomed to performing a mitzvah regularly.

The contrast to this belief is called averah goreret averah in which the commission of an aveira (sin) leads to another sin.

The phrase has often been used in songs for children to encourage the performance of good works. One popular song, written by Andy Vogel in 1986, was recorded on the Reform Jewish movement's "NFTY at 50" album, and is widely sung in the Reform Jewish movement.

== Examples ==
- A person makes a tzedakah donation, or places money in a pushka (tzedaka collection box). This act is seen by others, who in turn are inspired to place money in the box.
- A person helps someone in need, and feels good, and therefore continues to help others.
- After giving tzedakah, one realizes the power of a charitable act, and then one develops a continual habit of performing good deeds.
- After receiving an act of kindness, the recipient wishes to repay the good they have experienced, and in turn acts kindly towards another person, and the chain of good deeds continues.

== See also ==
- Karma
- Law of Threefold Return
- Golden Rule
- Violence begets violence
