= Shomea k'oneh =

Shomea k'oneh (Hebrew: שומע כעונה, "One who hears is the equivalent of one who recites") is a principle in Jewish law that, in general, allows one to fulfill their obligation of textual recitation by listening to another recite the text while both of them have in mind to effect such a fulfillment. The principle of shomea k'oneh is also indicated as the rationale for one fulfilling one's requirement to hear the shofar blown on Rosh Hashana even though the sounds are not the recitation of text.
