= Yad soledet bo =

The Hebrew phrase yad soledet bo (יד סולדת בו, the degree of heat "from which the hand recoils") is a principle in Jewish law that governs those laws that deal with cooking.

It can be referred to as "burning" and is the temperature at which someone would reflexively withdraw one's hand from the source of heat. The Talmud additionally refers to this degree of heat as that which would scald a baby's abdomen.

The temperature that constitutes yad soledet bo is under dispute. While Rabbi Moshe Feinstein ruled that a temperature of 110 °F (43 °C) must be considered yad soledet bo as a matter of practice, he noted that definitive yad soledet bo might be as high as 160 °F (71 °C). In practice, the more stringent of the two should be applied. In following with the principle of Legal doubt in Jewish law (sfeika d'oraita l'chumra), a doubt in a case of biblical law must be ruled upon stringently. If there is a question as to whether or not a violation of Sabbath would be transgressed by heating liquids to 120 °F, the response would be in the affirmative, because this temperature exceeds 110 °F; this would be an example of ruling stringently based on the lower temperature. As explained in greater detail further on, liquids that have already been fully cooked are no longer subject to the same restrictions as raw liquids in terms of bishul if they remain warm, and in cases of biblical laws of bishul, pre-cooked liquids should have reached a temperature of 160 °F to be properly considered as pre-cooked; this would be an example of ruling stringently based on the higher temperature.

A common practice when producing kosher wine is to render it yayin mevushal (יין מבושל, "cooked wine"); this is done in order to permit it to be handled by a non-Shabbat observer, whether Jew or gentile. While this cooking process used to be accomplished by bringing the wine or grape juice to a boil, recent technological advances have allowed for flash pasteurization to substitute for this procedure. According to one kosher wine maker, all of its mevushal wine is flash pasteurized to at least 185 °F, well above the stringent 160 °F of Rabbi Feinstein. However, there are more stringent authorities than Rabbi Feinstein in this matter, with some requiring 190 °F.

It is debated whether this is a subjective temperature for which different individuals may determine their own personal yad soledet bo. Rabbi Joshua Falk doubts that yad soledet bo can be anything but that which would objectively scald an infant's abdomen because the temperature at which people will instinctively withdraw their hand from a heat source is not universal. This deduction is further supported by more objective criteria such as the Weber-Fechner law which describes how humans (and other animals) respond to physical stimuli. Other authorities, including the Rosh, have no qualms about equating the two temperatures. Rabbi Yaakov Chaim Sofer quotes Rabbi Yosef Chaim's work Ben Ish Chai as stating that one can know if something is not yad soledet bo if one can put it in one's mouth without exceeding the normal limitations of the food being too hot for one to eat or drink.
