= Kareth =

Punishment of being "cut off" in Judaism

The Hebrew term kareth ("cutting off" Hebrew: כָּרֵת, [kaˈret]), or extirpation, is a form of punishment for sin mentioned in the Hebrew Bible and later Jewish writings. The typical biblical phrase used states that a person or a soul "shall be cut off from its people" or a slight variation of this.

Several different suggestions have been put forward for the understanding of this punishment in the Bible and in rabbinic thought.

== Etymology ==
The word kareth is derived from the Hebrew verb karat ("to cut off"). The noun form kareth does not occur in the Hebrew Bible; rather, verb forms such as venichreta ("[that soul] shall be cut off") are most common.

== Hebrew Bible ==
In the Hebrew Bible, verbs that underlie the later use of the noun form kareth refer to forms of divine punishment such as premature death, or to exclusion from the community. The former view is implied by verses stating that the punishment will be inflicted directly by God, while a punishment other than execution is suggested by verses which distinguish between being "cut off" and executed. In some cases, both kareth and the death penalty are specified as punishments for the same crime, implying that kareth is not exclusion (as exclusion and death are presumably incompatible penalties). Moreover, kareth is described as being executed by God, while the death penalty for the same crime is executed by humans. According to Richard C. Steiner, the phrase "to be cut off from one's people" is an antonym for "to be gathered to one's people" (e.g. Genesis 25:8), and thus to be "cut off" in the Bible means to be deprived of the afterlife.

The first account in the Book of Genesis stating that a person will be "cut off from his people" occurs in Genesis 17:14, following God's direction to Abraham that he and his descendants should be circumcised: anyone who was not circumcised would be "cut off", because they were in breach of God's covenant. Other examples of sins making a person liable to what is later referred to as kareth include eating chametz on Passover, sexual violations, and ritual impurities. The Book of Numbers also states that anyone who sins deliberately or "with a high hand" will be "cut off".

== Rabbinic interpretation ==
Kareth is the punishment for certain crimes and offences defined under Jewish law (e.g. eating the life blood of a living animal, eating suet, refusing to be circumcised, etc.), a punishment that can only be given at the hands of heaven. In some cases of sexual misconduct and in breaking the laws of the Sabbath, such as where there are witnesses of the act, such sins can also be punished with the judicial death penalty. By definition, kareth does not apply to non-Jews.

According to rabbinic sources, kareth can either mean dying young (before the age of 50 or 60), or else dying without children, or else the extinction of the soul and denial of a share in the world to come. According to Nachmanides, multiple definitions are accurate, and are applicable according to the nature of the person that committed the offense. If he was generally a good person, meaning that the good in him outweighed the evil, he is punished with dying before his time, unless he had other virtues that are cause for him to merit living out his full life, but retains his portion in the world to come. However, if the evil in him outweighed the good, he is then granted a good and lengthy life to reward him for the good that he did in his life, but upon death, he will have no portion in the world to come. According to Rabbi Yonah Gerondi, the Torah itself makes a distinction as to which form of kareth is to be applied for a particular offense. In most cases, the Torah uses the term such as that in Leviticus 18:29; the persons who commit them shall be cut off from among their people, which he says is a reference to a punishment in this world. However, when the Torah uses a term such as that in Numbers 15:31, that person will be cut off completely, his offense will remain with him, that penalty refers to being spiritually cut off after death.

There are two opinions as to what the nature of being spiritually cut off means in reference to the soul after death. Maimonides is of the opinion that this means that upon his death the "soul that left his body is completely destroyed and he dies the death of animal". Nachmanides maintains that the soul is not destroyed, but that the soul being cut off after death is a reference to the spiritual world where after death the soul exists in an exalted spiritual state, and that the penalty of Kareth is that he is not eligible to enter into that world. However, the soul lives on, and is eligible for the resurrection of the dead.

Kareth is applicable only when the transgression was done on purpose, and without later proper repentance, and is applicable only to Jews. When done unintentionally, such a transgression generally requires that a sin-offering be brought.

Kerithoth ("Excisions"), the plural of kareth, is the seventh tractate of the fifth order Kodashim of the Mishnah.

=== Offenses punishable by kareth ===
According to the Mishnah, kareth is the punishment for the following 4 offenses

1. Violating the Yom Kippur
2. Eating on Yom Kippur
3. Eating Chametz on Passover
4. Having sexual intercourse with a niddah

=== Punished individuals ===
The Mishnah names seven biblical individuals who do not get a share in Olam Ha-Ba ("the world-to-come") (Jeroboam, Ahab, Menasseh, Doeg the Edomite, Ahitophel, Balaam, and Gehazi), though Rabbi Yehuda excluded Menasseh from this list. Amon of Judah sinned very much, but his name was not placed on this list to come out of respect for his son Josiah. The Jerusalem Talmud cites Jehoiakim as an example of one who has forfeited his place in heaven by publicly transgressing the law.

According to the Legends of the Jews, Jair, one of the judges of Israel, was punished with kareth by God for forcing men to prostrate themselves before an altar of Baal: "Hear the words of the Lord ere thou diest. I appointed thee as prince over my people, and thou didst break My covenant, seduce My people, and seek to burn My servants with fire, but they were animated and freed by the living, the heavenly fire. As for thee, thou wilt die, and die by fire, a fire in which thou wilt abide forever." Thereupon the angel burnt him with a thousand men, whom he had taken in the act of paying homage to Baal."

The Talmud states that men who commit adultery (with another man's wife) are condemned to Gehenna.

== See also ==
- Annihilationism
- Banishment in the Torah
- Eternal oblivion
- Excommunication
- Herem (censure)
- Mortal sin
- Spiritual death
