= Jewish views on sin =

In Judaism, violation of any of the 613 commandments

Judaism regards the violation of any of the 613 commandments as a sin. Judaism teaches that to sin is a part of life, since there is no perfect human and everyone has an inclination to do evil "from youth", though people are born sinless. Sin has many classifications and degrees.

Unintentional sins are considered less severe sins. Sins committed out of lack of knowledge are not considered sins.

When the Temple yet stood in Jerusalem, people would offer korbanot (sacrifices) for their misdeeds. The atoning aspect of korbanot is carefully circumscribed. For the most part, korbanot only expiate unintentional sins committed as a result of human forgetfulness or error. No atonement is needed for violations committed under duress or through lack of knowledge, and for the most part, korbanot cannot atone for malicious, deliberate sin. In addition, korbanot have no expiating effect unless the person making the offering sincerely repents of his or her actions before making the offering, and makes restitution to any person(s) harmed by the violation.

== Terminology ==
The Hebrew Bible uses several words to describe sin. The standard noun for sin is ḥeṭ (verb: hata), meaning to "miss the mark" or "sin". The word avon is often translated as "iniquity", i.e. a sin done out of moral failing. The word pesha, or "trespass", means a sin done out of rebelliousness. The word resha refers to an act committed with a wicked intention. In several Biblical verses, a person confesses to several such categories of sin one after the other.

According to the rabbis, these terms refer to sins of different severities: ḥeṭ refers to unintentional sin, avon to intentional sin (not done to defy God), and pesha to rebellion. A person is responsible for each of these sins, though least responsible for unintentional sins and most responsible for sins of defiance and rebellion. Situations in which there is no responsibility include oness (one was forced to commit a sin by factors beyond their control); tinok shenishba (a person who was raised in an environment that was assimilated or non-Jewish, and is not aware of the proper Jewish laws); and heresh, shoteh, katan (deaf-mute, insane, minor - people who are presumed not to have mental capacity to understand their sin).

A term for sin often used in rabbinic Hebrew, but not appearing in the Bible, is aveira (meaning "transgression"). The related phrase la'avor brito ("to transgress His covenant") does appear in the Bible.

== View of human nature ==
Judaism rejects the idea of original sin: it believes that humans enter the world pure, with the ability to choose either good or evil via their free will. A person always has the power to avoid sin and its negative effects. Due to free will, goodness is not impossible, only difficult at times. This ability to choose freely is what makes humans responsible for those sins they do commit.

The Bible states that the tendency of the mind is to evil: "For the imagination of man's heart is evil from his youth" However, in the biblical verses this is brought as an argument for divine mercy, as humans cannot be blamed for the nature they were created with. Therefore God in his mercy allowed people to repent and be forgiven. God is said to temper justice with mercy, and to follow the Thirteen Attributes of Mercy in order to forgive sins.

Judaism teaches that humans contain a yetzer, or human instinct. Many sources speak of both a yetzer hatov ("good inclination") and a yetzer hara ("evil inclination") in the human soul. The yetzer hatov is conceptualized in different sources as a tendency towards goodness, productivity, or concern for others, while the yetzer hara is conceptualized as a tendency towards evil, selfishness, or base or animal behavior. In some sources the character of Satan, too, is equated with the human psychological inclination for evil (in contrast to the fallen angel of traditional Christianity). People have the ability to master their evil inclination (Genesis 4:7) and choose good over evil (Psalm 37:27).

Being a psychological inclination, the rabbis saw positive aspects even in the yetzer hara: without it, humans would not be motivated to marry, bear children, or conduct business (as these activities are often motivated by lust or greed). A similar attitude appears in Hillel’s famous statement: "If I am not for myself, who will be for me? And if I am only for myself, what am I?"

According to the Talmud, just four individuals in all of history never sinned: "Benjamin, son of Jacob; Amram, father of Moses; Jesse, father of David; and Chileab, son of David". By implication, the great heroes of the Bible - including Jacob, Moses, and David, mentioned in this very passage - did sin, as does every other person in history. In fact, the whole Tanakh is full of references to sins committed by leading people, which teaches that no one is perfect, everyone stands in trials/tests, and people should try their best to learn from their own mistakes.

In Judaism, a person is not judged in comparison to an ideal of no sin, or in comparison to great figures like Moses, but rather in comparison to their own personal potential, given their abilities and circumstances. This idea is exemplified by the following story:

Zusha, the great Chassidic master, lay crying on his deathbed. His students asked him, "Rebbe, why are you so sad? After all the mitzvot and good deeds you have done, you will surely get a great reward in heaven!". "I'm afraid!" said Zusha. "Because when I get to heaven, I know God's not going to ask me 'Why weren't you more like Moses?' or 'Why weren't you more like King David?' But I'm afraid that God will ask 'Zusha, why weren't you more like Zusha?' And then what will I say?!"

== Types of sin ==
=== Sins between man and his fellow ===
Jews recognize two kinds of sin, offenses against other people, and offenses against God. As such, in Judaism the term "sin" includes violations of Jewish law that are not necessarily a lapse in morality.

According to some sources, sins between people are considered more severe than sins between man and God, as the very purpose of the Torah is to prevent suffering. (Note: "For the Holy One, Blessed be He, desires commandments by which one does favor to other people, more than commandments between man and his Creator."; "That which is hateful to you, do not do to your fellow - the rest is commentary, go and learn it!"; "'Thou shalt love thy neighbor as thyself' - Rabbi Akiva says: This is the great principal of the Torah."; "The punishment for [dishonest] measures is worse than the punishment for sexual crimes, as the latter is between man and God, while the former is between man and his fellow."; Sforno, Kavvanat haTorah, section 2-3) Other sources say it is impossible to determine the relative severity of different sins. (Note: "You do not know the amount of reward for each commandment."; "Consider that in commandments of obedience (like idolatry and sexual relations) there is kareth and stoning and other death penalties and lashes, which is not the case with commandments of social relations and character traits like gossip, slander, and theft... But this is only regarding individuals who do them, whereas if the whole community is corrupted [by such sins], we find the reverse.")

=== Many small sins vs. One big sin ===
A story is told of two Jews who visited their rebbe, seeking advice regarding sins they had committed. One had committed a large sin which seemed unforgivable, while the other was less worried, only being guilty of the usual variety of minor sins. The rebbe told them to go outside and collect stones corresponding to the number and magnitude of their sins, and then to scatter those stones again in the field. Having accomplished this, they returned to the rebbe who told them to gather the scattered stones. He who had committed a single large sin found his large stone easily, while he who had committed many sins had trouble identifying and collecting all of his stones. The rebbe stated that the stones were comparable to sins: "You who committed a great sin was aware of having sinned, and with sincere repentance can repent. But you who committed many minor sins will find it hard to catch up with your sins until you realize that even small deeds matter."

=== Contract ===
Offenses against God may be understood as violation of the contract, or covenant, between God and Israelites. The Bible records several such covenants, by which the Israelites committed to obey God's commands, and in return God promised to reward them. As such, disobeying God's commands would constitute a breach of the covenant. Similarly, the poem of Jeremiah 2:1–3:5 shows evidence of a covenant broken by Israel.

=== Other situations ===
Sforno suggests that Leviticus 4:22, which discusses a leader who has sinned, begins with the term "when" (rather than "if") in order to imply that leaders - being powerful and wealthy people - will almost inevitably sin. This Torah verse concludes with the words "realizes his guilt" because it is essential that powerful people acknowledge and feel remorse for their sin, lest they sin again.

In Judaism one is not only permitted but required to perform most sins, if necessary in order to save human life. This principle is called pikuach nefesh. The only exceptions are the three exceptional sins (murder, idolatry, and sexual misconduct), which one must die rather than commit.

== Reward and punishment ==
=== Divine punishment ===
Divine reward and punishment is a central belief in Judaism, according to which God rewards the righteous and punishes sinners for their deeds. Such punishment may occur in this world (for example by receiving a bad harvest), or in the afterlife. The issue of theodicy is discussed in the Bible as well as rabbinic literature; according to one rabbinic opinion, mostly-righteous individuals are punished in this world for the sins they have committed, in order that they may be purely rewarded in the World to Come.

=== Human punishment ===
During the time of the Temple, Jewish courts punished certain sins with varying forms of punishment depending on the exact sin, as depicted in the Torah. These punishments included lashes, fines, and execution. After the destruction of the second Temple and the Sanhedrin, physical punishments were no longer given due to the necessity of the Sanhedrin for their execution.

== Atonement ==
Judaism describes various means of receiving atonement for sin, that is, reconciliation with God and release from punishment. The main method of atonement is via repentance. Other means (e.g. Temple sacrifices, judicial punishments, and returning stolen property) may be involved in the atonement process, together with repentance.

== See also ==
- Ethical monotheism
- Forbidden relationships in Judaism
- Jewish ethics
- Reward and punishment in Judaism
- Seven Laws of Noah
- Ten Commandments
- Three exceptional sins
- aveira goreret aveira "one sin leads to another sin" (Pirkei Avot 4:2)
