= Mitzvah =

Precepts and commandments in Judaism

In its primary meaning, the Hebrew word mitzvah (/ˈmɪtsvə/; Hebrew: מִצְוָה, romanized: miṣwā, lit. 'commandment', pronounced [mit͡sˈva]; pl. מִצְווֹת, miṣwōṯ, pronounced [mit͡sˈvot]) refers to a commandment from God that is to be performed as a religious duty. Jewish law (Halakha) largely consists of discussions of these commandments. According to religious tradition, there are 613 commandments.

In its secondary meaning, the word mitzvah refers to a deed performed in order to fulfill such a commandment. Thus, the term mitzvah has also come to mean an individual act of human kindness in keeping with the law. The expression conveys a sense of heartfelt sentiment beyond mere legal duty, such as "you shall love your neighbor as yourself" (Leviticus 19:18).

For some mitzvot, the purpose is specified in the Torah; though, the opinions of the Talmudic rabbis (Chazal) are divided between those who seek the purpose of the mitzvot and those who do not question them. The former believe that if Jews understand the reason for each mitzvah, it would help them observe and perform it. The latter argue that if the purpose for each mitzvah could be determined, people might try to achieve what they see as the ultimate purpose of the mitzvah while rejecting the mitzvah itself.

== Hebrew Bible ==
The feminine noun miṣwa (מִצְוָה, mitzvah) occurs over 180 times in the Masoretic Text of the Hebrew Bible. The first use is in Genesis 26:5 where God says that Abraham has "obeyed my voice, and kept my charge, my commandments (מִצְוֹתַי miṣwothai), my statutes, and my laws". In the Septuagint the word is usually translated with entolē (ἐντολή). In Second Temple period funeral inscriptions the epithet phil-entolos, "lover of the commandments", was sometimes inscribed on Jewish tombs. Other words are also used in Hebrew for commands and statutes; the Ten Commandments (עשרת הדיברות), for example, are the "Ten Words".

== Enumeration ==
Jewish tradition states that there exist 613 commandments. This number does not appear in the Hebrew Bible. The tradition that the number is 613 is first recorded in the 3rd century CE, when Rabbi Simlai claimed it in a sermon, perhaps to make the point that a person should observe the Torah every day with his whole body.

Rabbi Simlai gave as a sermon (darash Rabi Simlai): 613 commandments were communicated to Moses, 365 negative commands, corresponding to the number of solar days [in a year], and 248 positive commands, corresponding to the number of the members [bones covered with flesh] of a man's body.

However, this opinion was not universally accepted. Abraham ibn Ezra observed that there were over a thousand divine commandments in the Bible, but fewer than 300 applied to his time. Nachmanides found that the number was in dispute and uncertain. The number 613 is a rabbinical tradition rather than an exact count.

In rabbinic literature there are a number of works, mainly by the Rishonim, that attempt to enumerate 613 commandments. Probably the most famous of these is Sefer Hamitzvot by Maimonides.

== Rabbinic mitzvot ==
The Biblical mitzvot are referred to in the Talmud as mitzvot d'oraita, translated as commandments of the Law (Torah). In addition, rabbis of later generations decreed a number of additional laws, which are known as rabbinic laws (mitzvot derabbanan). Types of rabbinic laws include the takkanah and the gezeirah.

Medieval rabbis discussed the question of why a Jew should be required to follow rabbinic mitzvot, as they were not commanded by God, but rather by the rabbis. According to Maimonides, one who keeps rabbinic mitzvot is in fact following a Biblical commandment to obey the decisions of the Jewish religious authorities (Deut. 17:11, 32:7) According to Nahmanides, there is no biblical source for the obligation to keep rabbinic mitzvot.

In addition, many of the specific details of the Biblical mitzvot are only derived via rabbinical application of the Oral Torah (Mishna/Gemarah); for example, the three daily prayers in any language and the recitation of the Shema (Deuteronomy 6:4-7) twice a day in any language, the binding of the tefillin and the fixing of the mezuzah (Deuteronomy 6:8-9), and the saying of Grace After Meals (Deuteronomy 8:10).

=== The seven rabbinic mitzvot ===
Seven notable mitzvot d'rabbanan are as follows:

- To recite a blessing for each enjoyment
- To ritually wash the hands before eating bread
- To light Shabbat candles
- To construct an eruv to permit carrying to and within public areas on Shabbat
- To recite the Hallel psalms on holy days
- To light the Hanukkah lights
- To read the Scroll of Esther on Purim

These seven rabbinical commandments are treated like Biblical commandments insofar as, prior to the performance of each, a benediction is recited ("Blessed are You, O LORD our God, King of the universe, Who has commanded us ..."). In gematria, these seven, added to the 613 Biblical commandments, form a total of 620, corresponding to the numerical value of the phrase Keter Torah ("The Crown of the Torah").

== Categories of mitzvot ==
The commandments have been divided also into three general categories: mishpatim; edot; and chukim. Mishpatim ("laws") include commandments that are deemed to be self-evident, such as not to murder and not to steal. Edot ("testimonies") commemorate important events in Jewish history. For example, the Shabbat is said to testify to the story that Hashem created the world in six days and rested on the seventh day and declared it holy. Chukim ("decrees") are commandments with no known rationale, and are perceived as pure manifestations of the Divine will.

The commandments are divided into positive ("thou shalt") and negative ("thou shalt not") commandments. According to Jewish tradition, the 613 commandments contain 365 negative commandments and 248 positive commandments.

Many commandments concern only special classes of people – such as kings, Kohanim (the priesthood), Levites, or Nazarites – or are conditioned by local or temporary circumstances of the Jewish nation, as, for instance, the agricultural, sacrificial, and Levitical laws. Some are sex-dependent: for example, women are exempt from certain time-related commandments (such as shofar, sukkah, lulav, tzitzit and tefillin).

Three types of negative commandments fall under the self-sacrificial principle yehareg ve'al ya'avor, meaning "One should let oneself be killed rather than violate it". These are murder, idolatry, and forbidden sexual relations. For all other commandments, one must violate the commandment if the only alternative is to be killed.

According to Rabbi Ishmael, only the principal commandments were given on Mount Sinai, the remainder having been given in the Tent of Meeting. Rabbi Akiva, on the other hand, was of the opinion that they were all given on Mount Sinai, repeated in the Tent of Meeting, and declared a third time by Moses before his death. According to the Midrash, all divine commandments were given on Mount Sinai, and no prophet could add any new ones.

== Six constant mitzvot ==
Out of the 613 Mitzvot mentioned in the Torah, there are six mitzvot which the Sefer Hachinuch calls "constant mitzvot": "We have six mitzvot which are perpetual and constant, applicable at all times, all the days of our lives".

1. To know God, and that God created all things.
2. Not to have any god(s) beside God
3. To know God's Oneness.
4. To fear God.
5. To love God.
6. Not to pursue the passions of your heart and stray after your eyes.

== Mitzvot and Jewish law ==
In rabbinic thought, the commandments are usually divided into two major groups– obligations (מצות עשה, mitzvot aseh) and prohibitions (מצות לא תעשה, mitzvot lo ta'aseh).

The system describing the practical application of the commandments is known as Halakha. Halakha is the development of the mitzvot as contained in the written law (Torah), via discussion and debate in the oral law, as recorded in the rabbinic literature of the classical era, especially the Mishnah and the Talmud. The halakha regulates a wide range of Orthodox Jews' behaviour.

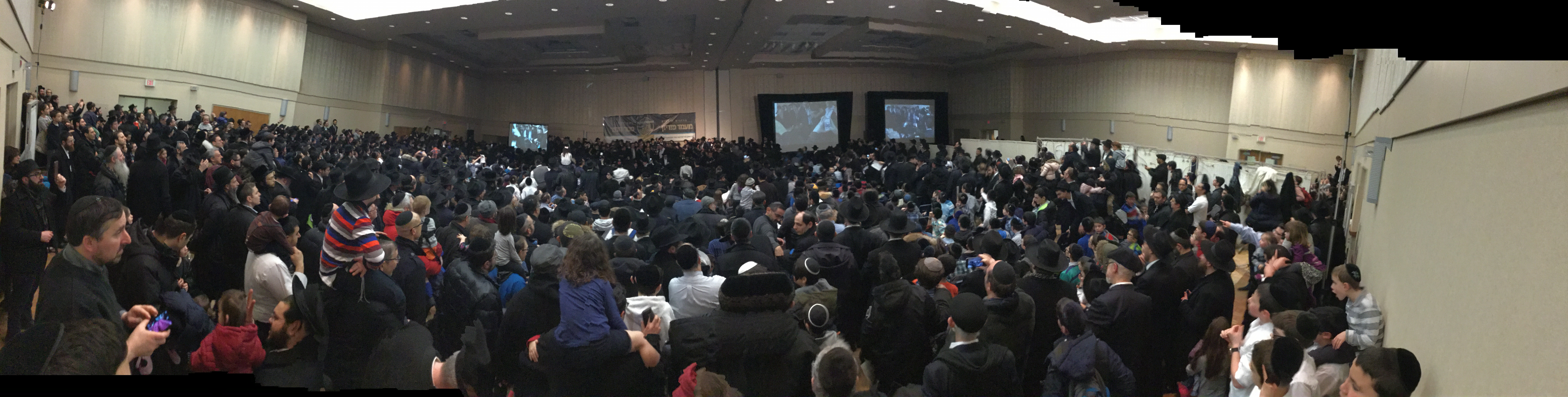
Thousands of people participate in the mitzvah of Petter Chamor in Toronto in 2017.

=== Applicability in the messianic age ===
The majority view of classical rabbis was that the commandments will still be applicable and in force during the coming Messianic Age. However, a significant minority held that most of the commandments will be nullified by, or in, the messianic era. Examples of such rabbinic views include:

- that the grain-offering of Judah and Jerusalem will be pleasing to God as in the days of old, and as in ancient years.
- that today we should observe the commandments (Babylonian Talmud, Tractate Avodah Zarah 3a, 4b); because we will not observe them in the world to come (Rashi)
- that in the future all sacrifices, with the exception of the Thanksgiving-sacrifice, will be discontinued (Midrash Vayikra Rabbah 9:7)
- that God will permit what is now forbidden (Midrash Tehillim, Mizmor 146:5)
- that most mitzvot will no longer be in force (Babylonian Talmud, Niddah 61b and Shabbat 151b).

There is no accepted authoritative answer within Judaism as to which mitzvot, if any, would be annulled in the Messianic era. This is a subject of theoretical debate and, not being viewed as an immediately practical question, is usually passed over in favor of answering questions of the practical halakha.

== See also ==
- Aveira (Transgression)
- Dharma (Hindu/Buddhist/Sikh)
- Emil Fackenheim
- Fard (Islamic)
- Law given to Moses at Sinai
- Mitzvah goreret mitzvah
- Pay it forward
- Seven Laws of Noah
- Tao (Chinese)
- Volunteerism
- Mitzvah Campaigns
