= Bemeizid =

Purposeful act in Jewish law

Bemeizid (Hebrew: בְּמֵזִיד) is used in Jewish law to indicate that something was done on purpose, "deliberately, with ill intent".

This matters in order to determine how culpable someone is for his actions. The opposite adjective is שוגג shogeg, "not on purpose."

In order to for an action to be considered deliberate, it must have been done with the knowledge that it was wrong, and with the intention of doing the action, and of his own free will.

If he did not know the action was forbidden, or if a mistake of fact concerning his circumstances led him to believe that he was permitted to take that action in that situation, he is considered to have done the action beshogeg (Hebrew: בְּשׁוֹגֵג), "not on purpose."

However, a physician or other person who causes damages may still be liable to pay damages, whether beshogeg (mere malpractice) or bemeizid (intentionally), except when the act was done to improve the world, for tikun ha'olom.

If he was forced to do the action, then it was done beones (Hebrew: בְּאֹנֶס).

== See also ==
- Animo
- Intent
- Mens rea
- Scienter
- Velleity
