= List of Karaite Jews =

This list of Karaite Jews consists of notable individuals who are associated with Karaite Judaism. It includes not only those individuals who were explicitly a part of a Karaite community, but also those Jews who held Karaite or proto-Karaite views. The association of each individual with Karaite Judaism must be explained in that individual's entry.

== Early Karaite period — 8th–9th centuries (700–899 CE) ==
- ‘Anan ben David, founder of the Annanites which would later be absorbed into Kara'ism
- Benjamin al-Nahawandi, regarded by some as the proper originator of Kara'ism as it has come down through the ages
- Abu 'Imran Musa al-Za'farani al-Tiflisi, a 9th-century founder of Karaite sect of the Tiflisites

== Golden Age — 10th–12th centuries (900–1199 CE) ==
- Aharon ben Mosheh ben Asher (died c.960 CE), refiner of the Tiberian writing system, regarded as having produced the most accurate version of the Masoretic Text
- Daniel al-Qumisi, Kara'ite scholar, polemicist, proto-Zionist, and compiler of the legal code Sefer ha-Mitzvot
- Hasun ben Mashiach, scholar who flourished in Egypt (or Babylonia) in the first half of the tenth century
- Ya'akov Qirqisani a.k.a. al-Kirkisani, dogmatist, author, and exegete of the early 10th century
- Yehudah Hadasi, 12th century scholar, philosopher, and grammarian from Constantinople
- Solomon ben Jeroham, exegete and controversialist
- Yefet ben Ali, Babylonian commentator on the Bible

== Middle period — 13th–17th century (1200–1699 CE) ==
- Aaron ben Elijah of Nicomedia (1328/9–1369), perhaps the most prominent Kara'ite theologian, considered the Kara'ite equivalent of his rabbinic contemporary, Maimonides
- Elijah Bashyazi (1420–1490), Hakham who codified Karaite laws
- Caleb Afendopolo (1430–1499), Hakham and polyhistor.
- Moses ben Elijah Bashyazi (1537–1555), wrote many Karaite books
- Yiṣḥaq b. Avraham of Troki, 16th century Lithuanian Kara'ite philosopher and writer who wrote the important apology or defense of Judaism vis-a-vis Christianity entitled Ḥizzuq Emunah (Fortification of Faith)

== Early-modern era — 18th–19th centuries (1700–1947 CE) ==
- Mordecai Sultansky (1772–1862), prominent scholar who wrote about angelology and the origin of Karaite Jews
- Abram Samoilovitch Besicovitch (1891–1970), Russian-English mathematician
- Adolph Joffe (1883–1927), Russian communist revolutionary, Bolshevik politician, Soviet diplomat
- Avraham Firkovich, famous leader of the Crimean Karaites, a very important collector of manuscripts, who was an amateur archeologist
- Shlomo ben Afeda Ha-Kohen (1826–1893), considered the last sage of the Constantinopolitan Karaites
- Solomon Krym (1864–1936), deputy in the Russian Duma
- Samuel Maykapar (1867–1938), Soviet composer
- Seraya Shapshal (1873–1961), ḥakham of the Lithuanian Karaite community
- Sima Babovich (1790–1855), ḥakham of the Crimean Karaites

== Current-modern era — 20th–21st centuries (1948 CE–present) ==
- Mordecai Alfandari (1929–1999), Ḥakham, known as the restorer of Karaism; in the years 1956-1958 published a Karaite bulletin in Hebrew called "Ha'Or" ("The Light"); he is also the author of studies on the Light of Israel website.
- Melech ben Ya'aqov, Ḥakham of the World Alliance of Qara'im and maintains the website Karaite Insights
- Moshe ben Yosef Firrouz, former Chief Ḥakham and Vice-Chancellor of Karaite Jewish University, maintains the website Universal Karaite Judaism
- Avraham Kefeli, Ḥazzan in Ashdod, Israel
- Moshe Marzouk (1926–1955), Egyptian Karaite Jew, hanged by Egypt for his participation in Israel's Operation Suzannah, also called the Lavon Affair
- Joe Pessah, Congregation leader of congregation B'nai Y'Israel in Daly City, California
- Avraham Qanaï (1946–2021), Ḥakham of the Karaite congregation “Oraḥ Ṣaddiqim” in Albany, New York
- Meir Rekhavi, Ḥakham and co-founder of the World Karaite Movement, holds the position of Chancellor for the Karaite Jewish University
