= History of the Jews in the Byzantine Empire =

Jews were numerous and had significant roles throughout the history of the Byzantine Empire.

== Background and legal standing ==
After the decline of the Greek-speaking Hellenistic Judaism in ancient times, the use of the Greek language and the integration of Greek culture into Judaism continued to be an integral part of life in Jewish communities in the Byzantine Empire. The legal standing of the Jews of the Byzantine Empire was unique throughout the empire’s history. They did not belong to the Christian Eastern Orthodox faith, which was the state church of the Byzantine Empire, nor were they, in most circumstances, grouped together with heretics and pagans. They were placed in a legal position somewhere between the two.

The place along the spectrum of social freedom in which Byzantine Jews found themselves varied somewhat, though far from drastically, over time. This status was shaped largely by three factors: the theological aim of the state to preserve Jews as a living testament to Christianity's triumph; the need to maintain state control; and the effectiveness of central rule from Constantinople in enforcing legislation.

Some Jewish communities along the Balkan frontier—particularly in Illyricum, Thrace, and Moesia—appear to have maintained distinct regional identities, shaped by local Hellenistic traditions and frontier administrative structures. These peripheral communities, while part of the Byzantine legal framework, often operated in relative isolation from the empire’s Jewish centers such as Thessaloniki or Constantinople, and may have retained older liturgical or linguistic customs.

== Foundations of the legal position of Jews: 330–404 ==
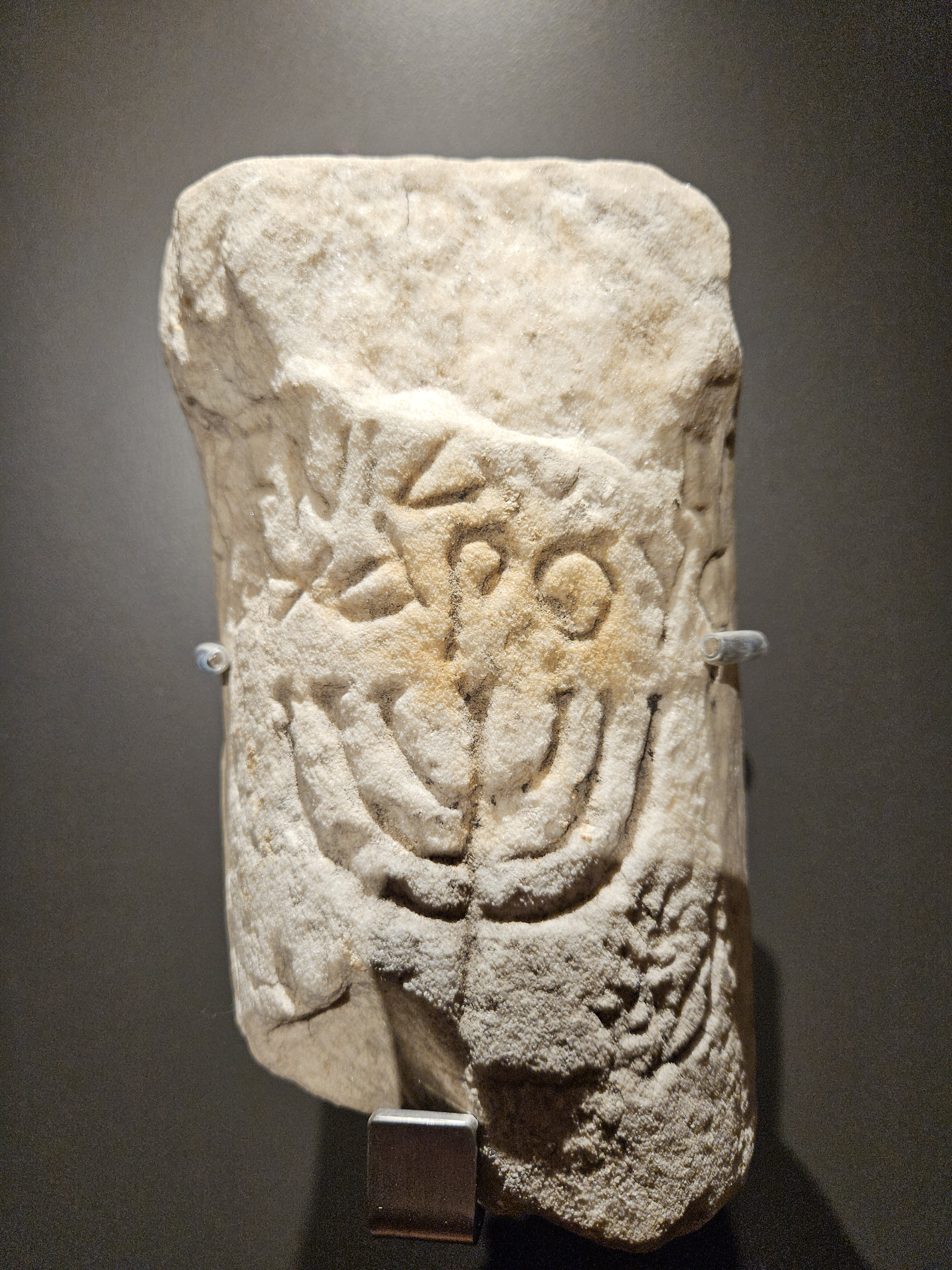
A 3rd century CE funerary inscription of a schoolmaster from Athens, possibly indicating the presence of a Jewish school in the city

In the Constitutio Antoniniana of 212, Caracalla bestowed citizenship on all residents including Jews of the Roman Empire, of which the Byzantine Empire is a continuation. This granted Jews legal equality to other citizens, and formed the foundation of their legal status in Byzantium following the founding of Constantinople in 330. Indeed, Jews enjoyed the right to practice their faith under the rule of the Byzantines, as long as they paid the Fiscus Judaicus. For example, circumcision, which was considered mutilation and therefore punishable by death if performed on a non-Jewish child, and by exile if performed on a non-Jewish adult, was legally permitted within Jewish religious practices. Byzantine law recognized synagogues as places of worship, which could not be arbitrarily molested. Jewish courts had the force of law in civil cases, and Jews could not be forced to violate Shabbat and their festivals.

In the year 390, nearly all of the territory of present-day Israel came under Byzantine suzerainty. The area was divided into the provinces of Palestina Prima, Palestina Secunda, and Palestina Tertia. These provinces were part of the Diocese of the East.

== Theodosian Code: 404–527 ==
In 404, Jews were excluded from certain governmental posts. In 418, they were barred from the civil service, and from all military positions. In 425, they were excluded from all remaining public offices, both civilian and military, a prohibition which Justinian I reiterated. Such restrictions, however, inevitably compromised the theological arguments for restricting the Jewish religion. Although they empowered the Christian citizens of the empire at the expense of its Jews, all laws dealing with the Jews implicitly recognized the continued existence and legality of the Jewish religion.

Thus Emperor Theodosius II found that he had to balance the first two of the three factors governing the treatment of Jews in the empire—theology, political pragmatism and enforceability. He could not, however, effectively control the third. In 438, Theodosius had to reaffirm the prohibition on Jews holding public office, because it had been poorly enforced. Even in 527, a decree which renewed this prohibition began by observing that "heedless of the laws' command [they have] infiltrated public offices".

There was one office, however, that Jews were not forbidden from assuming. This was the office of decurion, a tax collector who was required to pay all deficits in revenue from his own pocket. Theodosius II, who laid out much of the legal precedent and foundation for Byzantine law in his Theodosian Code, permitted Jews, like other citizens, to hire a substitute to perform the duties of decurion in their place. Justinian, whose legal code included 33 laws relating to the Jews, initially maintained this ability, but it was abolished in 537. Sharf explains that the purpose of this was so that the Jews "never enjoy the fruits of office, but only suffer its pains and penalties".

In addition to the matter of holding public office, Jews were also unequal to Christians with respect to the ownership of slaves. Restrictions on the ownership of Christian slaves by Jews were in place through the reign of many emperors, under the fear that Jews would use conversion of slaves as a means to increase their number. Additionally, this was designed to provide an incentive for non-Christian slaves to convert into Christianity, and an economic restriction on the Jews. Restrictions on slave-owning could not, however, be excessively burdensome, because slaves, although numerous, were between 10 and 15% of the population. Under the Theodosian Code, therefore, ownership of Christian slaves by Jews was not prohibited, although their purchase was. Thus, one who gained possession of a slave by means such as inheritance would remain his or her owner. Purchase of slaves was usually penalized by compelled sale at the original purchase price.

Slave ownership produces another example of the threefold balancing act of Legislation dealing with the Jewish minority of Byzantium: ownership of Christian slaves undermined the "living testament" theology, but was a pragmatic requirement of the time, and the prohibition thereof could not be entirely enforced, since freedom may not necessarily have been a desirable option for a slave who was well-treated by his masters.

The third important restriction on Judaism—in addition to the limitations on public service and slave ownership—was that the Jewish religion, though allowed to survive, was not allowed to thrive. Theologically, the victory of Christianity could be successfully asserted by maintaining a small contingent of Jews within the empire, although allowing them to become too sizable a minority would threaten the theological monopoly of Orthodox Christianity within the Empire.

One important ramification of this policy was the prohibition on the construction of new synagogues within the Empire, though the repair of old synagogues was permitted. This prohibition was difficult to enforce, as archaeological evidence in Israel indicates that illegal synagogue construction continued throughout the sixth century. The synagogue did continue to be respected as an inviolable place of worship until the reign of Justinian.

Beginning at this time, most legislation regarding the Jews—even laws which expanded the rights which they were afforded—were "prefaced by unambiguous expressions of hatred and contempt for Judaism".

== Justinian Code: 527–565 ==
The Civil Code of Justinian tightened the regulations on the ownership of Christian slaves by non-Christians. It abolished compensation for illegal purchases of Christian slaves, and added a 30 lb gold fine for this offense. Jews owning Christian slaves during the time of Justinian could be punished by execution.

In 545, Justinian legislated that the right of existence of any synagogue on land belonging to an ecclesiastical institution be nullified. He was also the first emperor to order that existing synagogues be converted into churches. There is, however, only one example of such a conversion taking place by force: the synagogue in Borem. This synagogue was most likely converted for military reasons, in light of its strategic position on the frontier with the territory of the Berber tribes. In fact, Justinian banned all non-Christian places of worship in northern Africa, in legislation that grouped Jews with pagans and heretics. This legislation was hardly enforced, but set a precedent for the violability of synagogues and the blurring of the difference between Jews and other non-Christians. Once more, this represents the divergence between the Empire's theological objectives, its pragmatic goals and its capability to enforce its legislation. The poor efficacy of legislation points to the dominating power of the latter in restraining the two former factors, which, in this case, coincided.

The Jews also found that they were positioned in law somewhere between other non-Christians and the Christian majority. For instance, Justinian demanded that Passover be shown as subservient to Easter; in cases in which the former would fall before the latter, the Jews were forbidden from celebrating it on its appointed day, and were compelled to delay it. Jews were also forbidden from giving testimony concerning Christians in a court of law—a restriction already present in the Theodosian code—although Justinian eased this restriction in 537 to allow them to testify in cases between Christian individuals and the state. This privilege was not enjoyed by any other non-Christian group. Once more, the state sacrificed the doctrinal subordination of the Jews in order to gain practical benefits, in this case testimony against those who faced it in court.

Questions of internal Jewish discourse—which could, under the Theodosian Code, be arbitrated only by Jewish courts—could, under the Justinian Code, be officiated by the state, a power which Justinian did not shy away from utilizing. In 553 for instance, Justinian required that the public reading of the Pentateuch proceed in vernacular, rather than Hebrew, and forbade altogether the reading of the Mishna. In this way, Justinian not only restricted the religious freedom of the Jews, but also expanded his own power in order to reinforce the principle that, "in theory, there is no area that falls outside of the Empire's legislative power". Justinian's restrictions were, however, poorly enforced. Ironically, what little enforcement they did enjoy contributed to a notable growth in Jewish culture and liturgy. For instance, the banning of the reading of Mishna prompted Jewish scholars to write the piyutim, important works of poetry which refer strongly to the Mishna. Because these were not banned by the Civil Code, they afforded Jews the ability to circumvent it. Accordingly, this form of religious expression flourished under Justinian.

== Punctuated tolerance, Jewish revolts, and the Crusades: 565–1204 ==
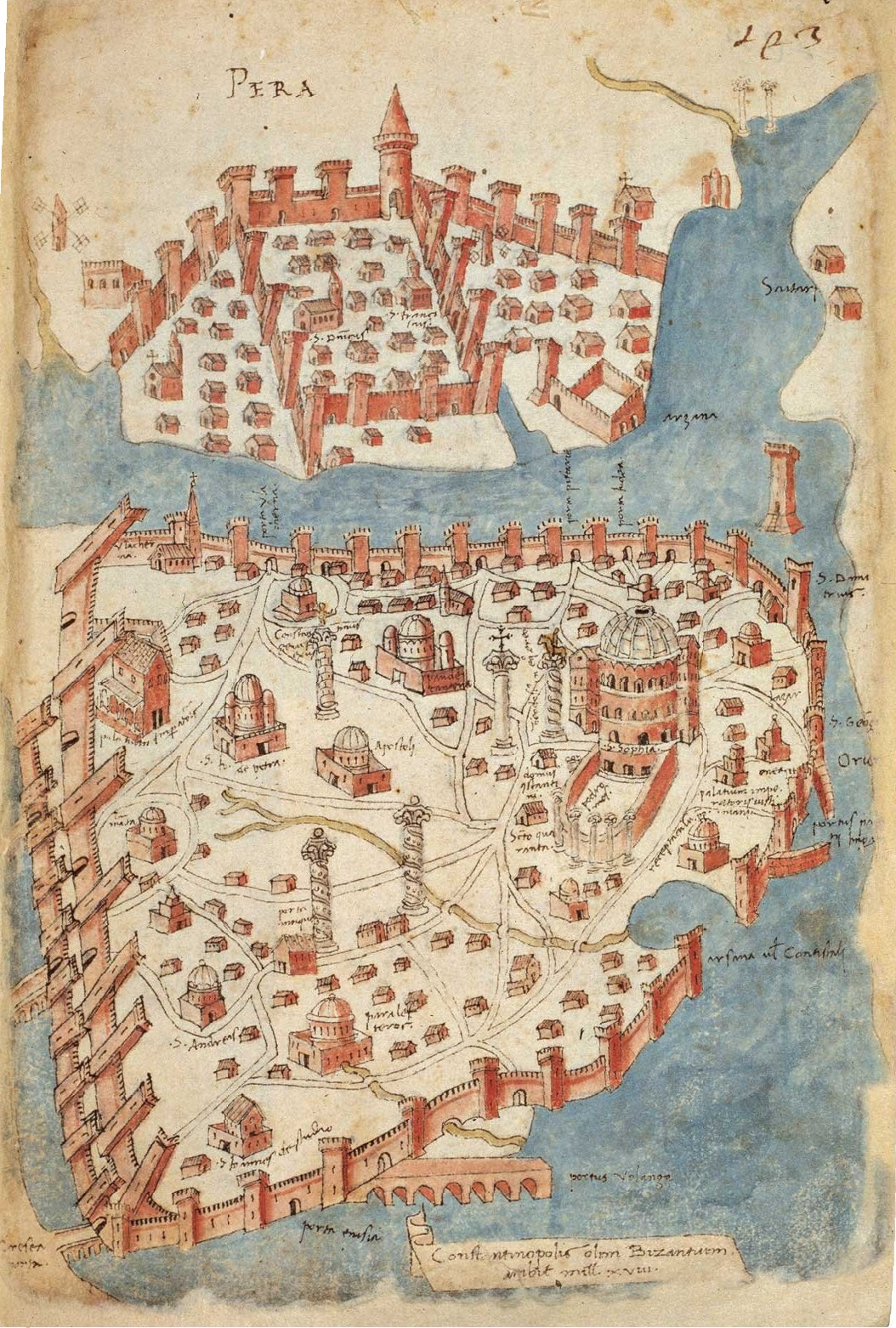
Pera became the main Jewish district after the Jews were moved there from the city proper in 11th century; after the period of Latin rule the Jews were concentrated in Vlanga on the shore of the Sea of Marmara (Volanga on the map)

Although the Justinian Code remained in force in the Eastern Empire until the ninth century, the period following Justinian's reign was generally characterized by toleration of non-Christians, particularly the Jews. However, during the Byzantine–Sasanian War of 602–628 many Jews sided against the Byzantine Empire in the Jewish revolt against Heraclius, which successfully assisted the invading Persian Sassanids in conquering all of Roman Egypt and Syria. In reaction to this, anti-Jewish measures were enacted throughout the Byzantine realm and as far away as Merovingian France. Soon thereafter, in 634 the Muslim conquests began, during which many Jews initially rose up again against their Byzantine rulers. During this time Heraclius became the first emperor to force the conversion of Jews to Christianity. Following his death, and until 1204, the Jews suffered only three notable legal persecutions, the sum of whose span was roughly fifty years. It is even debated whether the first of these—the anti-Jewish measures passed during the reign of Leo III the Isaurian—could be considered a persecution. The second of these, during the reign of Basil I from 867 to 886, briefly punctuated the tolerance of the ninth century. The last of these persecutions took place under John Tzimiskes, who reigned from 969 to 976. Accordingly, there were no recorded legal persecutions of the Jews for nearly two and a half centuries following his reign.

In fact Samuel Krauss writes in his famous work on Byzantine Jewry that Constantinople at the time of the Byzantine Empire was "the center of the Jewish, Samaritan and Karaite scholarship". Eleazar ben Killir a Byzantine Jew from a Greek-speaking area wrote his famous piyutim, which are still in use in the most Machzorim and became the teacher of all paytanim who came after him. Asaph the Jew wrote in Byzantium the first Hebrew medical treatise.

The Sefer Yosippon was written down in the 10th century in the Byzantine south Italy by the Greek-speaking Jewish community there. Judah Leon ben Moses Mosconi, a Romaniote Jew from Achrida edited and expanded the Sefer Josippon later. This community of Byzantine Jews of southern Italy produced such prominent works like the Sefer Ahimaaz of Ahimaaz ben Paltiel, the Sefer Hachmoni of Shabbethai Donnolo, the Aggadath Bereshit and many piyyutim. The liturgical writings of these Romaniote Jews, especially the piyyut were eminent for the development of the Ashkenazi Mahzor, as they found their way through Italy to Ashkenaz and are preserved to this day in the most ashkenazi mahzorim. Like in the case of the Hellenistic Jewish authorship some of the Byzantine Jewish manuscripts show the use of the Greek language in religious and communal aspects. The language of this manuscripts is not in Ancient Greek, but rather in an older form of Modern Greek. These texts are the oldest known written texts in Modern Greek. Beside these Rabbanites and as a part of the Empire's Romaniote Jews, important Karaite communities like the Constantinopolitan Karaites and the Karaites of Adrianople flourished and produced eminent personalities for the Karaite movement like Caleb Afendopolo, Elijah Bashyazi, Aaron ben Joseph of Constantinople, Aaron ben Elijah, Judah Hadassi and other.

In the twelfth century, there were about 2,500 Jews in Constantinople, 2,000 Jews in Thebes and 500 Jews in Thessalonica. Halmyrus, Rhaedestus, Chios, and Rhodes each housed 400 Jews. Also, there were about 300 Jews each in Corinth and Samos, and 200 Jews in Gallipoli.

Some Jewish families in the rural provinces of the empire, such as Thrace, Moesia, and Pannonia Secunda, appear to have maintained distinct communal practices shaped by local customs and Hellenized liturgical traditions. These frontier communities often remained outside major urban centers and were less affected by imperial persecutions or theological controversies. Archaeological and genetic studies suggest a degree of regional continuity among these populations, which may have preserved older forms of worship and maternal lineage traditions into the High Middle Ages.

It was in the 12th century that the passing Crusaders wrought havoc upon the Jewish communities of Byzantium, in a foretaste of what the later Latin occupation would bring upon the Byzantine Christians. Although most crusading bands did not adopt a policy of violence or forced conversion against the Jews, the First Crusade certainly undertook an anti-Jewish face in certain communities. Because the Crusade was undertaken with the goal of "subjugating all non-believers to the faith," many crusaders compelled Jews to convert on pain of death, and there is a large number of recorded cases of mass suicides within Jewish communities—particularly among Jewish maidens—in order to avoid such conversions.

== Latin occupation: 1204–1261 ==
The Fourth Crusade further degraded the position of Byzantine Jews. As smaller states separated from a weakened empire, the rulers of these states found themselves more capable of enforcing legislation than their Byzantine counterparts. The most powerful protection on the rights of Jews—governmental impotence to enforce laws—was thus abolished. Theodore Doukas, who crowned himself emperor of Epiros after he conquered Thessalonica, was known for his persecution of the Jews, which began in 1229, a year before the end of his reign. Theodore's disdain for the Jews is well-established. Still, his waiting until 1229—five years after capturing Thessalonica and declaring himself emperor—indicates that antisemitism may not have been the cause of his anti-Jewish edicts. Rather, they appear to have been motivated by a desire to confiscate Jewish property at a time when his empire was short of funds. This explains the expropriations of Jewish property under Theodore, as well as his regime's abstention from religious persecution for its own sake.

John Vatatzes, the emperor of Nicaea, commenced legal persecution of the Jews in 1253. Unlike Theodore, Vatatzes ordered that the Jews within the Empire of Nicaea be converted to Christianity, though he did not order the expropriation of Jewish property. Although these measures began only a year before Vatatzes' death, they seemed to have set a precedent of persecution which his son, Theodore II Laskaris, followed.

It was in this environment of persecution that the Palaiologoi rose to the imperial throne. Michael VIII Palaiologos largely ended persecution of the Jews. Bowman writes the following:

Michael VIII summoned the Jewish leaders in his realm and invited them to support him as emperor. Thus Michael's first act toward the Jews […] was the revocation of John Vatatzes's order of forced baptism. At the same time, however, he made it clear to the Jews that he expected them to show their appreciation for his assistance.

Michael's road to the throne had been of questionable legality, and that fact earned him many enemies. Additionally, he oversaw an empire which was strongly dependent on foreign powers, and had an immense need for gold to fund its great military expenses. It is not surprising, therefore, that he turned to the Jews and other minorities (most notably the Armenians) as a source of support in an embattled state of affairs, and when the ethnic majority and the mainstream elite had grown unfriendly toward him.

== A decaying empire: 1261–1453 ==
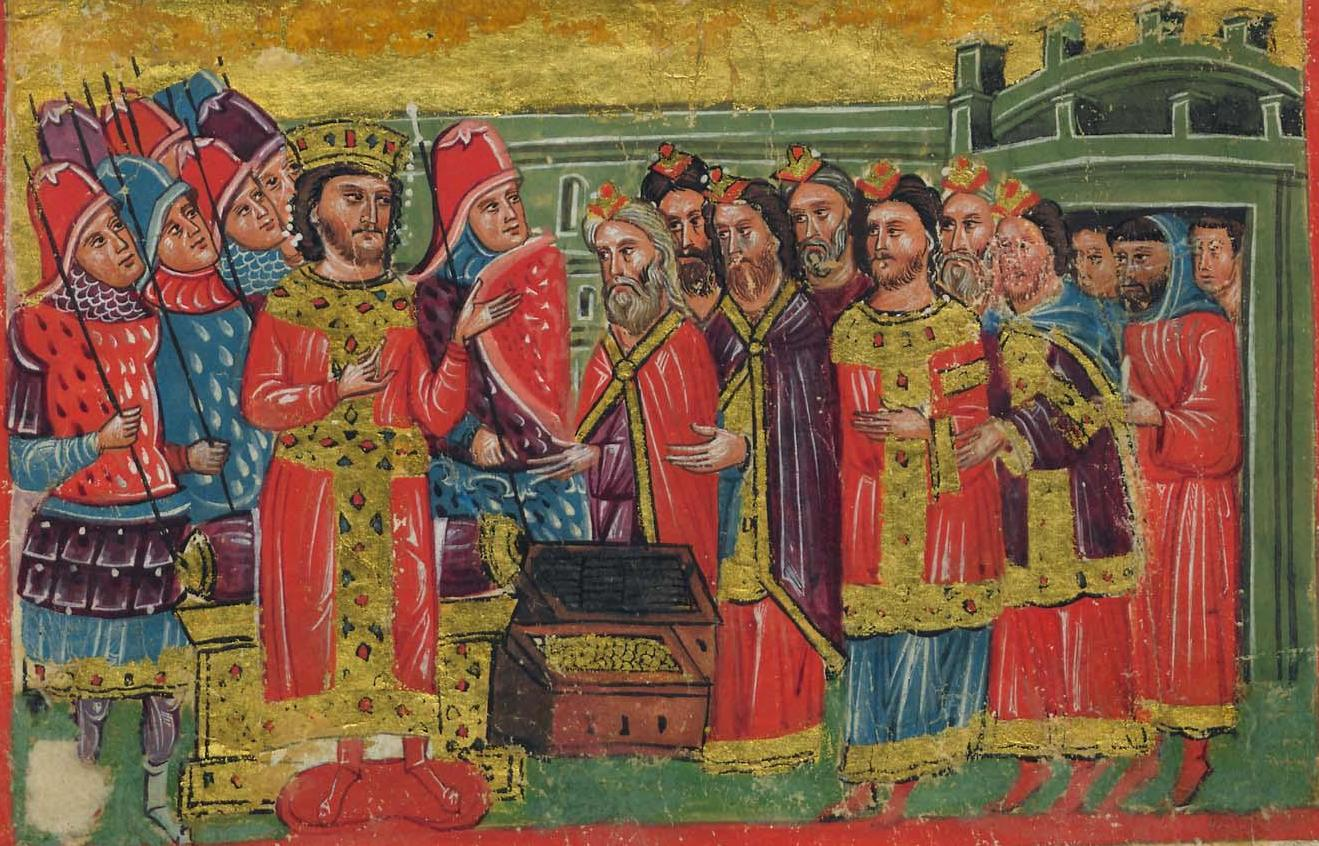
Alexander the Great, clad as a Byzantine emperor, receives a delegation of Jewish rabbis. Miniature from the 14th-century Trebizond Alexander Romance

Andronikos II Palaiologos followed his father's precedent. The tolerance of Andronikos was quite notable, even drawing condemnation from Patriarch Athanasius III of Alexandria, against what he saw as "excessive" tolerance of Jews and other non-Christians, in particular for permitting them to live amongst Christians. The patriarch's complaint indicates that, in spite of the tolerance of the Palaiologoi, the norm of imperial law was to require non-Christians to live separately from Christians. This apparent trend of segregation between the peoples of Byzantium, which certainly included the Jews, is confirmed in a letter by John, bishop of Citrus, in the latter half of the twelfth century, which declared that, "People of alien tongues and alien beliefs, such as Jews, Armenians, Ishmaelites, Hagarites and other such as these were permitted from of old to dwell in Christian countries and cities, except that they had to live separately and not together with the Christians". In Constantinople, there was a Jewish quarter near the eponymous gate in the modern Yenikapı area.

By the fourteenth century, the Jewish question of Byzantium seemed to be most concerned with Venetian Jews. Venetians had come to reside in the Empire in large numbers by the early 14th century, and treaties between the Empire and Venice granted the Venetians living in the empire, including Jews of Venetian origin, special privileges, though they also carried certain minor economic prohibitions. Under the aegis of these treaties, Venetian Jews could buy, sell or rent land anywhere in Constantinople. They also enjoyed a more favorable tax structure than Byzantine citizens, as well as the freedom of movement and settlement anywhere in the Empire.

Further complicating this legal status, some Jews obtained Venetian citizenship either "by coming from areas subject to the Republic or by purchasing naturalization", thus obtaining the same privileges as Venetian nationals in the Empire. At this time, the Empire was in rapid decay, and could not seriously enforce laws intended to curtail these rights and regain economic control within its borders. Thus, an exception to the general trend of Byzantine history emerged during this century, whereby Jews were entitled to a broader set of rights than Christians. However, these liberties were conferred based on their being Venetian, not based on their Jewish identity. Non-Venetian Jews did not profit from the Venetian-Byzantine treaties, and non-Jewish Venetians enjoyed the same liberties as their Jewish compatriots.

== See also ==
- History of the Jews in the Roman Empire
- Romaniote Jews
