= Japheth (disambiguation) =

Japheth is one of the sons of Noah in the Bible.

Japheth may also refer to:

- Japheth Kimutai (born 1978), Kenyan middle-distance runner
- Japhet Korir (born 1993), Kenyan long-distance runner and 2013 World Cross Country Champion
- Levi ben Japheth (11th century), Karaite Jewish scholar
- Israel Meyer Japhet (1818–1892), German cantor and grammarian
- Gilad Japhet, Israeli entrepreneur, genealogist, and founder of MyHeritage
- Maggott, a comic book superhero whose real name is Japheth
- Japeth Aguilar (born 1987), Filipino basketball player
- Japeth the Goat, a character in the 2005 animated film Hoodwinked!
