= Constantinopolitan Karaites =

Karaite Jewish community developed in Constantinople (modern-day Istanbul, Turkey)

Καραΐτες Κωνσταντινουπόλεως

Total population
- 130

Regions with significant populations
- Turkey: 80
- Israel: 50

Languages
- Karæo-Greek, Hebrew, Turkish

Religion
- Karaite Judaism

Related ethnic groups
- Other Jews, especially Crimean Karaites, Romaniotes

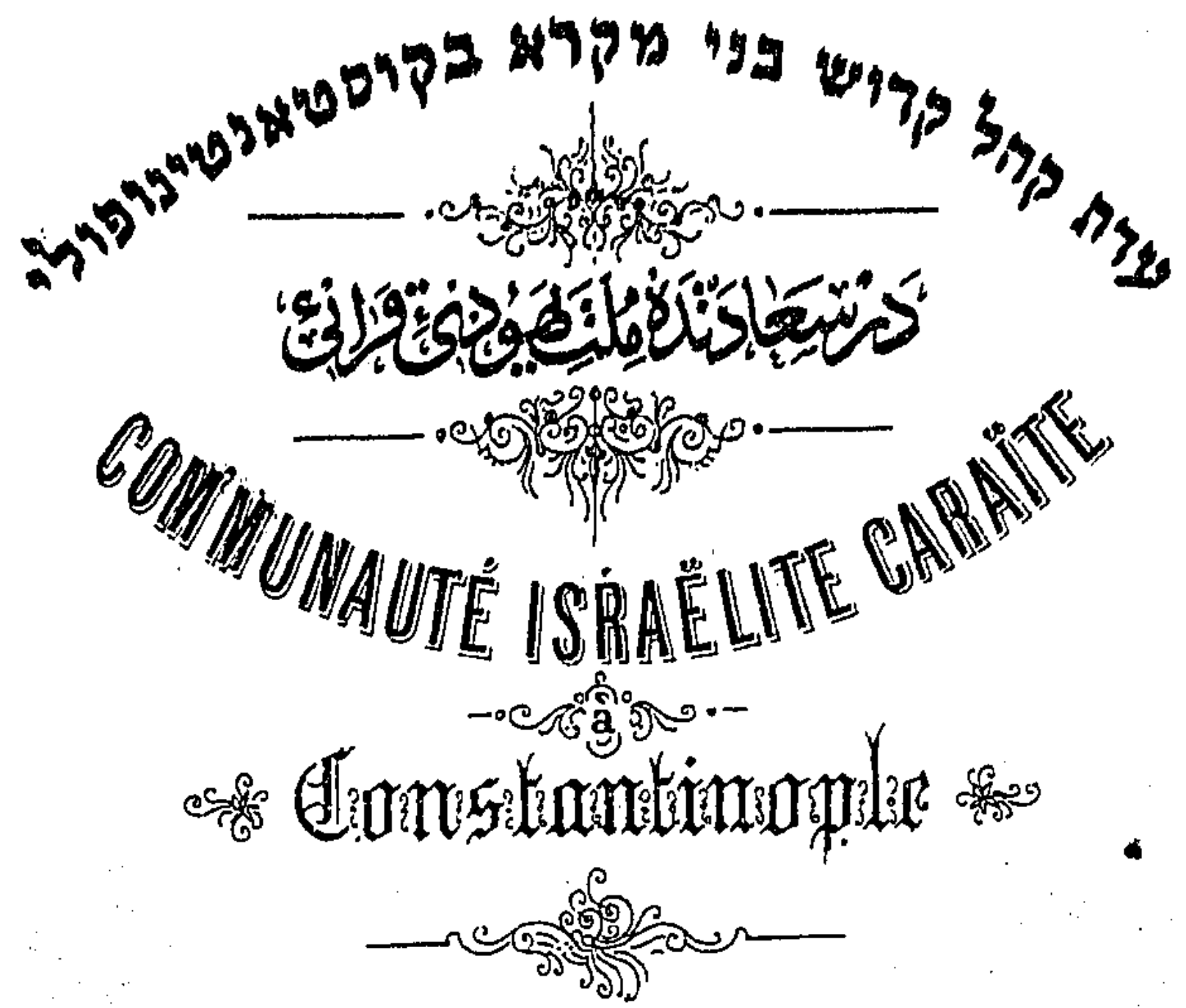
Logo on the letterheaded papers of the Karaite community in Constantinople (1880)

The Constantinopolitan Karaites or Greco-Karaites are a Karaite community with a specific historical development and a distinct cultural, linguistic, and literary heritage stemming from their residency in the capital of the Eastern Roman Empire. There are numerous commonalities between the community and the Rabbinical Romaniote Jews.

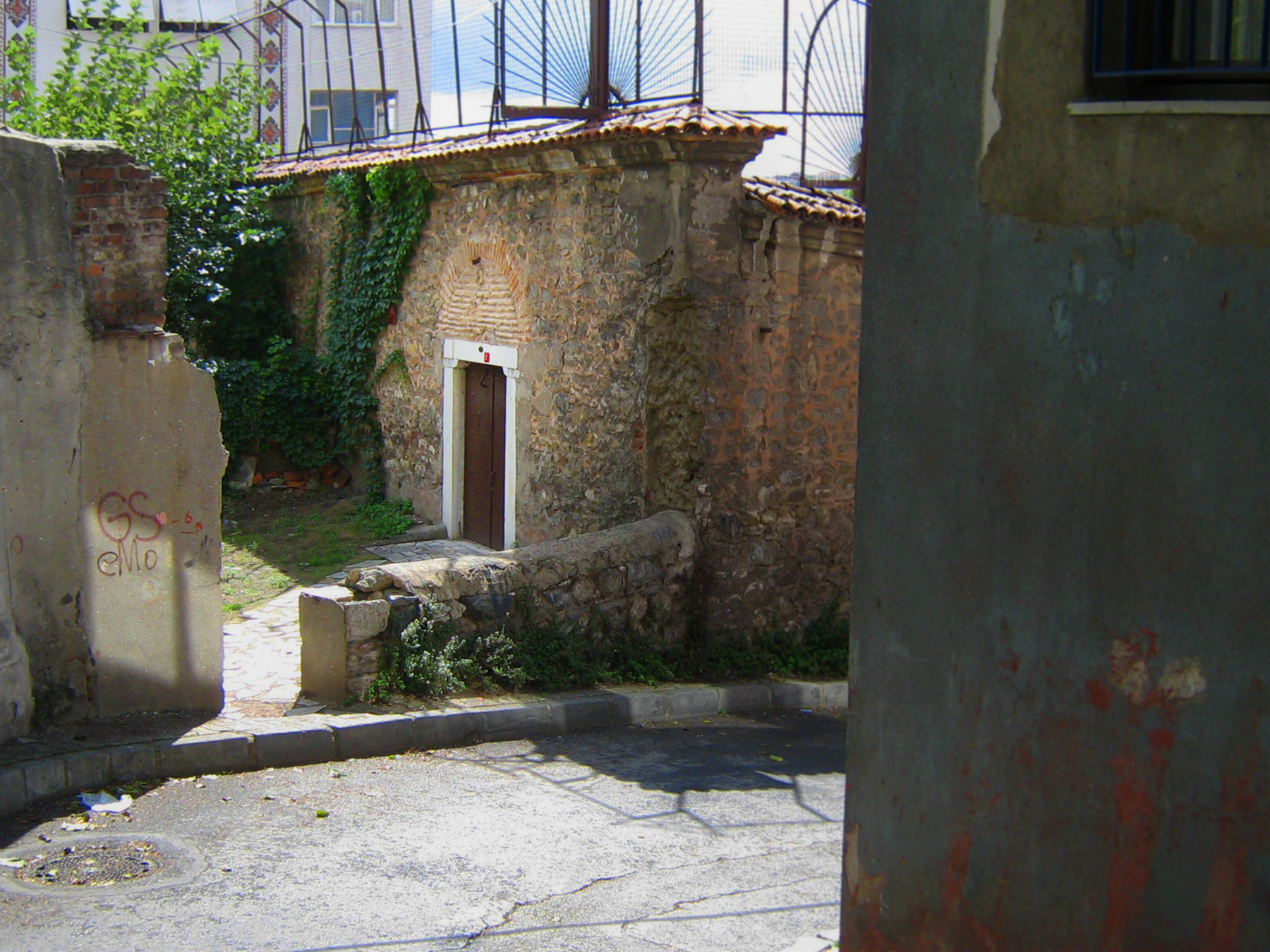
View on the Karaite Synagogue of Istanbul

== History ==
Karaites have lived in Constantinople (modern-day Istanbul) for more than a thousand years. Smaller settlements in the surrounding area of Constantinople have existed as well, such as the Karaites of Adrianople, who themselves descend from the Constantinopolitan community. While having close relations and daily interactions with the Grecophone Byzantine Christians and the Romaniote Jews, they nonetheless developed their own unique Karaeo-Greek dialect of the Yevanic language; this dialect was used by elder members of the community until recently. The Karaite Elias Afeda Beghi compiled a glossary on the Hebrew Bible with Hebrew words translated into Greek. Other works of Greco-Karaite literature are also known.

== Language ==
Until recently, the Constantinopolitan Karaites spoke Karaeo-Greek. Their Hebrew has some special features which connect them with the Tiberian Hebrew of the Tiberian Masoretes.

== Influence on Karaite Judaism ==
In spite of the small size of this community, the Constantinopolitan Karaites have had a great influence on the Karaite Judaism through their literary output. The communities of Constantinople and Adrianople produced important figures for the Karaite movement, such as Caleb Afendopolo, Elijah Bashyazi, Aaron ben Joseph of Constantinople, Aaron ben Elijah, Judah Hadassi, Moses Beghi, a 15th/16th century paytan; Judah Gibbor, a paytan and author of several writings; Judah Poki ben Eliezer (nephew of Elijah Bashyazi) a scholar; and Elijah Yerushalmi, also a scholar. These authors have produced prominent theological, liturgical and philosophical works, which have been eminent for the development of the wider Karaite Judaism. It was the work "Seder Tefillot" (Book of Prayers and Hymns) of Aaron ben Joseph of Constantinople that was adopted by most of the Karaite congregations as the standard prayer-book, and that probably earned for him the epithet "ha-Kadosh" (the Saint). In order to settle the religious laws Elijah Bashyazi compiled a code entitled "Aderet Eliyahu" (The Mantle of Elijah). This code, which contained both the mandatory and prohibitory precepts, is rightly regarded by the Karaites as the greatest authority on those matters. Shlomo ben Afeda Ha-Kohen considered the last of the Karaite sages of Constantinople wrote an abridgment of the "Aderet Eliyahu" in 1860, named "Yeriot Shelomo".

== Relations with other groups ==
There were close relations (though not always appreciative) between the Rabbanite and Karaite "Romaniotes" of Constantinople, as can be seen in the exchange of piyyutim for their liturgies, which went both ways, but consisted mostly of Karaite borrowings from the Rabbanite liturgical repertoire.

== Origin of the Crimean Karaites ==
It is possible that the Crimean Karaites are descendants of Karaite merchants who migrated to Crimea from the Byzantine Empire. In one particular incidence, migration of Karaites from Constantinople to Crimea is documented following a fire in the Jewish quarter of Constantinople in 1203.
