= Mordecai Comtino =

Turkish Jewish Talmudist and scientist (f. 15th century)

Mordecai ben Eliezer Comtino (Hebrew: מרדכי כומטיאנו; lived at Adrianople and Constantinople; died in the latter city between 1485 and 1490) was a Talmudist and scientist.

The earliest date attached to any of his writings is 1425. The form of his family name is doubtful, and has been transcribed by modern scholars as "Comtino." Mordecai's biographer, Jonah Hayyim Gurland, uses the form "Kumatyano," a name which he found still in use in Turkey (Geiger, in "Wiss. Zeit. Jüd. Theol." iii.445; idem, "Melo-Chofnajim," p. 13). He was the pupil of Enoch Saporta, a distinguished Talmudist, known for his cultivation of the sciences and his tolerance toward the Karaites.

== Life and career ==
Mordecai was the teacher not only of Elijah Mizraḥi, but also of the Karaites Elijah Bashyaẓi and Caleb Afendopolo. Though an opponent of their teachings, Mordecai was held in honor by the Karaites, two of his piyyuṭim being included in their Siddur (Landshut, "'Ammude ha-'Abodah," p. 200).

Most of his works have come down in manuscript, selections from which have been published by Gurland, in his "Ginze," part iii., 1866. The scientific bent of his mind is shown in his commentary to the Pentateuch (MSS. Paris, Nos. 265, 266; St. Petersburg, No. 51), in the preface to which he speaks of his researches in grammar, logic, physics, astronomy, arithmetic, geometry, and metaphysics. This commentary, in which he especially criticized Abraham ibn Ezra, was attacked by Shabbethai ben Malchiel Kohen ("Hassagot," c. 1460), which attack Mordecai answered in his "Teshubot Hassagot" (Steinschneider, "Cat. Codicum Hebr. Bibl. Acad. Lugduno-Batavæ," pp. 202–207). He also wrote commentaries to Ibn Ezra's treatises "Yesod Morah" (dedicated to his pupil Joseph Rachizi), "Sefer ha-Shem," and "Sefer ha-Eḥad" (MS. Paris, No. 661; compare Adolf Neubauer, "Cat. Bodl. Hebr. MSS." col. 436), and a commentary to Maimonides's "Millot ha-Higgayon," printed in Warsaw, 1865.

Mordecai was a teacher of mathematics, and did much to advance the study of the exact sciences in Turkey. In his commentaries to Ibn Ezra he has often occasion to touch upon such subjects. His chief works in this branch are: a treatise in two parts on arithmetic and geometry, in which he follows partly the Greek and Latin authors, partly the Mohammedan (MSS. Berlin, No. 49; Brit. Mus. 27,107 A; Paris, 1031, 5; St. Petersburg, 343, 344, 345, 346); "Perush Luḥot Paras," a commentary written in 1425 on the astronomical tables of Yezdegerd, tables already treated of by Solomon b. Elijah Sharbiṭ ha-Zahab (MSS. Paris, Nos. 1084, 1085; St. Petersburg, 359); glosses to Euclid (MS. Günzburg, No. 340, 5); an essay upon the construction of the astrolabe, "Tiḳḳun Keli ha-Neḥoshet," as a complement to the Hebrew works on the subject, which he found to be superficial; an essay (1462) upon the construction of the astronomical instrument ("Al-Ẓafiḥah") invented by Al-Zarkala, written at the request of his pupil Menahem (MSS. Munich, No. 36, 13; Paris, 1030, 5; St. Petersburg, 353); an essay upon the construction of an instrument for measuring time (sun dial), which can be made in two different ways (MS. St. Petersburg, No. 361).
