= Benjamin Nahawandi =

Persian Jewish scholar on Karaite Judaism

Benjamin Nahawandi or Benjamin ben Moses Nahawendi (Persian: بنیامین نهاوندی Nahāwandī; Hebrew: בנימין אלנהאונדי) was a prominent Persian Jewish scholar of Karaite Judaism. He was claimed to be one of the greatest of the Karaite scholars of the early Middle Ages. The Karaite historian Solomon ben Jeroham regarded him as greater even than Anan ben David. His name indicates that he is originally from Nahawand, a town in Iran (Persia).

== Works ==
Benjamin's work is, for the most part, known only in quotations made by subsequent Karaite writers. Yefet ben Ali, in the introduction to his commentary on the minor prophets, wrote that Benjamin was the author of several works, mostly in Judeo-Arabic:

- a commentary on the Torah, in which he frequently refers to Oriental customs;
- a commentary on Isaiah;
- a commentary on the Book of Daniel, in which the word yamim (days)—in the verse "Blessed is he that waiteth, and cometh to the thousand three hundred and five and thirty days" (xii. 12)—is explained by "years," pointing thus to the year 1010 as the epoch of the arrival of the Messiah;
- a commentary on Ecclesiastes and Song of Songs.
- Sefer Mitzvot ("Book of Commandments");
- Sefer Dinim or "Mas'at Binyamin" ("Book of Laws", or "Gift of Benjamin"), written in Hebrew, and published at Koslov (Eupatoria) in 1834—containing civil and criminal laws according to Holy Writ.

== Rabbinical ordinances ==
One of Benjamin's innovations was the adoption of many rabbinic ordinances, previously rejected by the Karaites. Unlike the rabbis, however, he left to the free choice of individual Karaites to reject or adopt these regulations. His opinion on these matters is summed up in his writing, Sefer Dinim (Book of Rules), in which he wrote "As for other rules, which are observed and recorded by the Rabbanites and for which I could find no pertinent biblical verse, I have written them down also, so that you might observe them likewise if you so desire."

For example, Benjamin promoted the rabbinic idea of cherem, with the caveat that the wrongdoer would have to be cursed for seven days following his refusal to obey a judge's summons, to give him a chance to repent and obey (Mas'at Binyamin 2a).

Ironically, some dispute his authorship of the commentary on Isaiah and instead regard it as the work of Saadia Gaon, one of the greatest opponents of Karaism.

== Biblical Exegesis ==
Benjamin at times approached the Rabbinites in Biblical exegesis also, and combated Anan's interpretations. Thus he maintained with the Rabbinites, against Anan, that the obligation to marry the widow of a childless brother extended only to the brother of the deceased and not to his further relations. He adopted the Talmudical interpretation of the Biblical words concerning the Sabbath—"Abide ye every man in his place" (Ex. xvi. 29)—maintaining that the prohibition herein expressed has reference, not to the residence, but to a distance beyond 2,000 yards of the town (cf. Elijah Bashyazi, "Adderet," p. 63).

== Freedom in thought ==
However, in spite of many concessions to Rabbinism, Benjamin adhered firmly to the principle, expressed by Anan, of penetrating research of the Scripture. In Benjamin's opinion one ought not to tie oneself down to the authorities, but to follow one's own convictions: the son may differ from the father, the disciple from the master, provided they have reasons for their different views. Inquiry to Benjamin was a duty, and he held that errors arrived at through sincere inquiry do not constitute a sin (compare Yefet ben Ali's commentary, cited in Dukes's "Beiträge," ii. 26).

== Philosophy of the Bible ==
Benjamin seems to have written a work in which he expounded the philosophical ideas contained in the Bible. Judging from the quotations made by later Karaite writers, such as Jacob al-Qirqisani, Yefet ben Ali, and Hadassi, Benjamin betrayed the influence of Philonic ideas, while he adopted the Motazilite theories on the divine attributes, free-will, and other questions of a like character expounded before by Anan. God, he holds, is too sublime to mingle with the material world; and the idea that matter proceeded directly from God is inadmissible. God created first the Glory ("Kabod"), then the Throne ("Kisse"), and afterward an Angel. This Angel created the world, in which he is the representative of God. God Himself never came in contact with men, nor did He speak to Israel on Mt. Sinai. The Law and the communications to the Prophets proceeded from the Angel, to whom are referable all the anthropological expressions concerning God found in the Bible (Hadassi, "Eshkol," 25b). The soul forms a part of the body, and is therefore perishable. The Biblical references to reward and punishment can be applied only to the body (Saadia, "Emunot we ha-De'ot," vi. 4).

This theory of an intermediary power, and the system of allegorizing all the Biblical passages concerning God, upon which Benjamin insists again and again in his commentaries on the Bible, were borrowed from the writings of the etc. Magâriyah (Men of the Caves). This etc., the establishment of which, in consequence of a confusion in the text of Shahrastani, has been wrongfully attributed to Benjamin, is identified with the Essenes by Abraham Harkavy, who shows that they were called "The Men of the Caves," because they lived in the desert. Benjamin wrote his halakhic works in Hebrew.

== See also ==
- List of Iranian scholars and philosophers
- Persian Jews
