= Levi ben Japheth =

Levi ben Japheth, born Abu Said al-Lawi ibn Hasan al-Basri (Arabic: أبو سعيد اللهوي/لاوي إبن حسن البصري, d. 11th-century CE), was a prominent Jewish Karaite scholar who flourished in the first half of the 11th century CE, probably at Jerusalem or Ramleh. He is the author of Kitab an-Ni'ma (The Book of Grace), which is the earliest known Karaite compendium of Mu'tazilite thought.

Although, like his father, Japheth ben Ali, he was considered one of the greatest authorities among the Karaites, who called him al-Shaikh (the master), no details of his life are found in the Karaite sources. There is confusion in regard to his identity; in some sources he is confounded with his brother, his son Sa'id (comp. Pinsker, "Liqqute Qadmoniyyot," p. 119), or with Muslim scholar Abu Hashim (Aaron ben Joseph, "Mibhar," Paris MS.). Levi wrote a comprehensive work in Arabic on the precepts, parts of a Hebrew translation ("Sefer ha-Mitzvot") of which are still extant in manuscript. This work, which was used by nearly all the later Karaite codifiers, contains valuable information concerning the differences between the Karaites and the Rabbinites (in whose literature the author was well versed) and the dissensions among the Karaites themselves. Thus, in the section dealing with the calendar, in which the year 1007 is mentioned, Levi states that in Iraq the Karaites, in their determination of Rosh ha-Shannah, resembled the Rabbinites in that, like them, they took for their basis the autumnal equinox, while in some places the Karaites adopted the Rabbinite calendar completely.

Levi distinguishes between the views, in regard to the calendar, of the earlier and later Rabbinites and counts Saadia, whom he frequently attacks, among the latter. In a treatise on tzitzit, Levi says that he drew his material from the works of his father and his predecessors. He excuses the inadequacy of treatment marking some parts of the work on the ground of the lack of sources and of the various trials and sicknesses he had suffered during its composition.

Levi's "Muqaddimah," an introduction to the pericopes of the Pentateuch, is no longer in existence. A fragment, on Deut. i., of the Hebrew translation of Moses ben Isaiah Firuz was in the Firkovich collection and was published by Pinsker, but was lost during the Crimean war. He wrote also a short commentary on the Earlier Prophets, a fragment of which, covering the first ten chapters of Joshua, still exists (Brit. Mus. Or. No. 308). Steinschneider believes it possible that Levi was also the author of the short commentary on Psalms found in the British Museum (No. 336). According to Ali ben Sulaiman, Levi made a compendium of the lexicon "Agron" of David ben Abraham; however, this is contested by Abu al-Faraj, who asserts that the compendium was prepared by David himself.

== Resources ==
- Kohler, Kaufmann and Isaac Broydé. "Levi ben Japheth (halevi) Abu Sa'id." Jewish Encyclopedia. Funk and Wagnalls, 1901–1906; which contains the following bibliography:

- Pinsker, Liḳḳuṭe Ḳadmoniyyot, p. 64 and Index;
- Julius Fürst, Geschichte des Karäerthums. 1862, ii. 143 et seq.;
- Moritz Steinschneider Polemische und Apologetische Literatur, p. 336;
- Moritz Steinschneider Die Hebräischen Übersetzungen des Mittelalters und die Juden als Dolmetscher. Berlin, 1893, p. 945
- Moritz Steinschneider Die Arabische Literatur der Juden, § 46.K. I. Br.
