= Hasun ben Mashiach =

10th-century Karaite scholar

Hasun ben Mashiach was a Karaite scholar who flourished in Egypt (or Babylonia) in the first half of the tenth century. According to Steinschneider, "Hasun" is a corrupted form of the Arabic name "Hussain," the ו being easily confounded in manuscript with the י Hasun, or, as he is generally quoted by the Karaite authorities, ben Mashiah, was a younger contemporary of Saadia Gaon, whom, according to Sahl ben Matzliah in his Tokahat Megullah, he once challenged to a religious controversy. Hasun was the author of a polemical work, written probably in Arabic, in which he refuted one of Saadia's unpublished anti-Karaite writings, which came into his possession after the death of the author. Owing to a misunderstanding of a passage (§ 258) in the Eshkol ha-Kofer of Hadassi, Ḥasun was erroneously credited with the authorship of the anonymous chapter on theodicy, entitled Sha'ar Tzedek (St. Petersburg, Firkovich MSS. Nos. 683, 685), in the religio-philosophical work "Zikron ha-Datot," and of Quppat ha-Rokelim. Simḥah Isaac Luzki attributes to Ḥasun also a work on the precepts (Sefer ha-Mitzvot). Abraham ibn Ezra, in his introduction to the commentary on the Pentateuch, quotes a Karaite scholar named Ben Mashiah, who is probably identical with Hasun.

== Resources ==
, which cites the following bibliography:

- Pinsker, Liḳḳuṭe Ḳadmoniyyot, p. 114;
- Julius Fürst, Geschichte des Karäerthums. ii. 46;
- Avrom Ber Gotlober, Bikoret le-Toledot ha-Kara'im ביקורת לתולדות הקראים, Vilna, 1865, p. 168;
- Steinschneider, Hebr. Bibl. iv. 48;

- idem, Cat. Bodl. p. 2169;
- idem, Cat. Leyden, p. 390;
- idem, Hebr. Uebers. p. 460;
- idem, Die Arabische Literatur der Juden, § 41.S. I. Br
