= William Zeitlin =

Russian scholar and bibliographer

- Born: c. 1850; Gomel, Mogilev Governorate, Russian Empire
- Died: 1921 (aged 70–71); Leipzig, Saxony, Weimar Republic

Academic work
- Notable works: Kiryat Sefer (1891–95)

William Zeitlin (Hebrew: זאב צייטלין, romanized: Ze'ev Tseitlin; c. 1850 – 1921) was a Russian scholar and bibliographer.

== Biography ==
William Zeitlin was born in Gomel, Mogilev Governorate, into a prominent Jewish family from Shklov.

His major work was Kiryat Sefer, or Bibliotheca Hebraica Post-Mendelssohniana (Leipzig, 1891–95), a bibliographical dictionary of Hebrew literature of the Haskalah from the beginning of Moses Mendelssohn's epoch until 1890. It indexes not only works in book form, but also important periodical articles, biographical sketches, and scientific essays, in addition to giving biographical notes on several authors. The compilation of this work occupied Zeitlin for twenty years. He made extensive use of Isaac Benjacob's Otzar ha-Sefarim and of Julius Fürst's Bibliotheca Judaica, and visited Vilna and Warsaw, the centres of the Hebrew book market, as well as many university cities—such as Königsberg, Berlin, Geneva, and Paris—from the libraries of which he gathered additional material for his work.

Zeitlin had previously prepared an index of works written on the Hebrew calendar, in which he enumerates seventy-seven Hebrew works; this index was published by Hayyim Jonah Gurland in Yevreiski Kalendar (St. Petersburg, 1882). In the Zeitschrift für Hebräische Bibliographie (IX. 3–4), Zeitlin published an alphabetical list of anagrams and pseudonyms of modern Hebrew writers; he was also a contributor to several Hebrew periodicals, writing mostly biographical articles.
