= Moshe ben Yosef Firrouz =

Israeli Karaite hakham

Moshe ben Yosef Firrouz משה בן יוסף פירוז
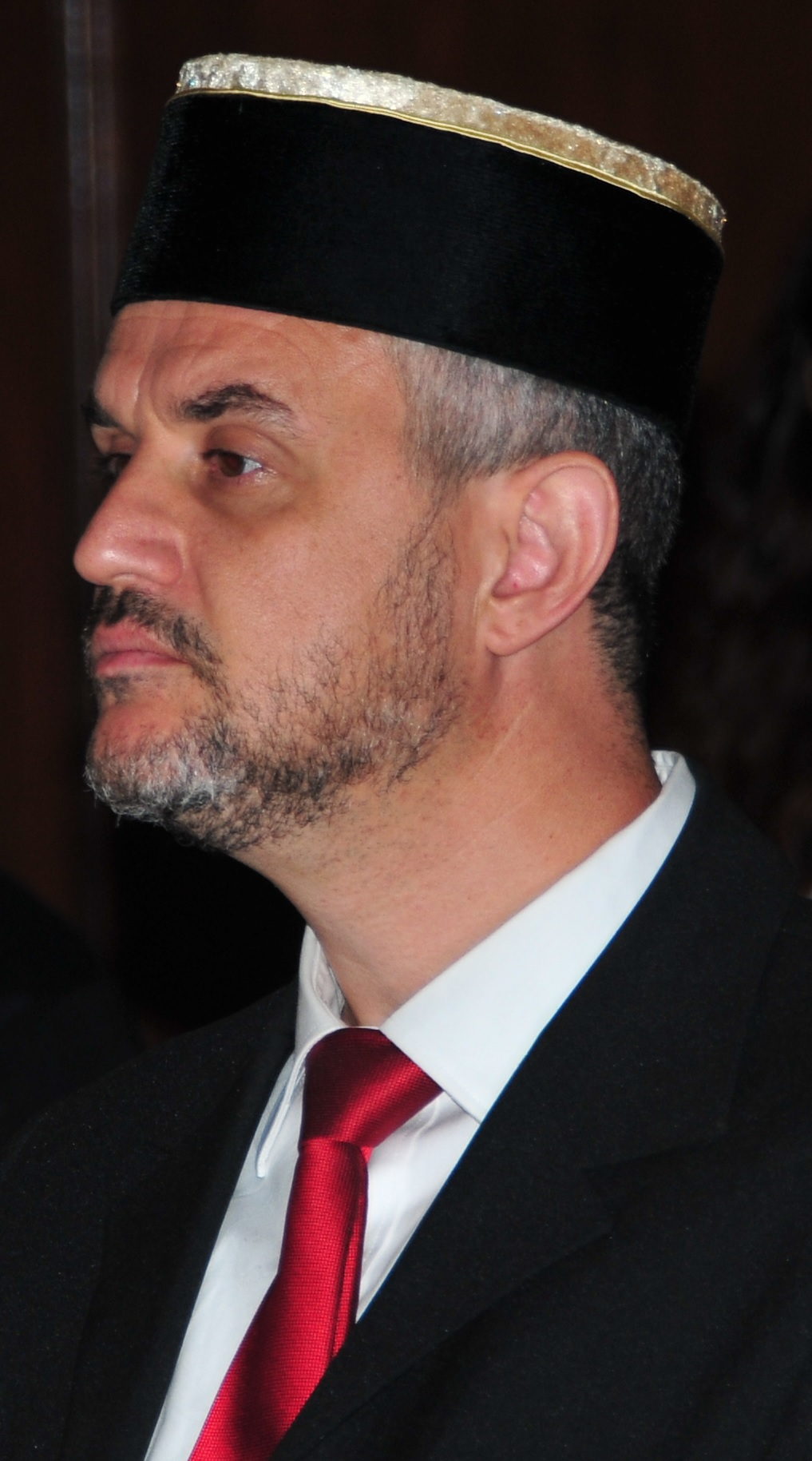

Personal life
- Born: 1972 (age 53–54)

Religious life
- Religion: Judaism

Ḥakham Moshe ben Yoseph Firrouz (Hebrew: משה בן יוסף פירוז; born 1972) is an Israeli Karaite Hakham and Torah scholar (sage). He is the former Chief Ḥakham (spiritual leader) as well as Registrar of Marriage and Divorce of Israel's traditional Karaite Jewish Community. He served as Chairman of the Council of Sages of World Karaite Judaism and its religious council. Though Karaites do not have Rabbis, he is considered a Rabbi for the purpose of accommodating the Israeli authorities.

== Biography ==
A child of Jewish refugees from Egypt, Moshe Firrouz was born in 1972 in Or Yehuda, and as a child moved to Bat Yam. He fulfilled his military service in the Air Force, after which he earned a BA in nuclear engineering and a master's degree in management and safety engineering at Ben Gurion University of the Negev.

After his arrival in Beer–Sheva's Karaite community he began attending Torah classes and seminars that took place in the local Karaite Beth Midrash. After studying under the guidance of Ḥakham Yoseph Morad and Ḥakham Magdy Shemu'el, he was ordained, proclaimed a Ḥakham by the Council of Sages and served as its secretary. Since his ordination, in 2007, he has been teaching various Tanakh lessons held across the country and has taught prospective converts to Judaism through the Karaite movement in his capacity as Vice-Chancellor of the Karaite Jewish University (an online school that teaches Karaite Judaism to both Jews and gentiles). Between late 2004 and 2015 Firrouz operated the first Karaite website in Hebrew that included a forum. Additionally, he has held religion classes and sessions in Renan and acts as a certified ritual slaughterer.

In 2011 he was elected Chief Ḥakham by the Council of Sages and served in this position until January 2021, when he stepped down due to ill health. In this role he was appointed by former prime minister Benjamin Netanyahu registrar of marriage and divorce to Israel's Karaite Community and has held together with other Karaite Ḥakhamim wedding ceremonies according to Karaite Biblical tradition. Firrouz was succeeded in the role of Chief Ḥakham by Simhon Firrouz, and currently still serves as a Karaite Ḥakham.

Starting in 2016, alongside his religious responsibilities, he has been employed as a computer systems engineer at Ben Gurion University of the Negev, where he previously held a position in the chemistry department.

He holds a Ph.D degree from the Faculty of Sciences – Humanities and Social Sciences in the Department of Jewish Thought in Israel. His research deals with the most important book authored by Ḥakham Yehudah Hadassi, "Eshkol HaKofer".

Firrouz is married to Yael, lives in Beer-Sheva and is the father of four children.

== Research ==
- Moshe Firrouz, The Karaite Jewish Community in Israel (20th and 21st Centuries), Karaite Archives 1 (2013), pp. 1–9 .
- Mourning : customs and laws : According to the custom of the Karaite Jews (Karaite Judaism worldwide, Tsha"g 2012).
