= Solomon ben Elijah Sharbit =

Jewish astronomer, poet, and grammarian

Solomon ben Elijah Sharbit Ha-Zahab was a Jewish astronomer, poet, and grammarian; he lived at Salonica and later at Ephesus, in the second half of the fourteenth century.

Moritz Steinschneider supposes that the name "Sharbiṭ ha-Zahab" is the Hebrew equivalent of the Greek name "Chrysakokka," borne by the translator of the Persian "Astronomical Tables," which Solomon rendered into Hebrew, perhaps under the title "Mahalak ha-Kokabim" (Paris, Bibliothèque Nationale, MS. No. 1042; Vatican MS. No.393). Another of Solomon's translations from the Greek, still extant in manuscript in various libraries, is the treatise of Ptolemy on the astrolabe.

In addition to these translations, Solomon wrote "Ḥesheḳ Shelomoh," a grammatical treatise (Bibliothèque Nationale MS. No. 1042); a commentary written at the request of some prominent Jews of Ephesus on the "Sefer ha-Shem" of ibn Ezra; and a great number of liturgical poems, some of which are found in the Roman Maḥzor. Several of Solomon's poems (among which one on the alphabet, entitled "Otiyyot ha-Ḳodesh Meribot Zu 'im Zu," is a masterpiece of elegance) have been published by David Kohen ("Aḥiasaf,"1893).

Solomon wrote also a commentary on the Pentateuch, in which he vehemently attacked Karaite Biblical interpretations. Against these attacks was directed the "Iggeret ha-Ẓom" of Elijah Bashyaẓi.
