= Jacob Alsari =

Jacob Alsari (Hebrew: יעקב אלעזרי) was a darshan, teacher, and Hebrew grammarian, who for eighteen years lectured in Hebrew in Zerkowo, Prussian Poland. Jacob Alsari wrote Dore Ma'alah on Angelology and on accents. He was also the author of a religious poem and notes to the Targumim. None of these works has been published.

His son Joseph, born in Zerkowo in 1805, claims to have translated the family name (said to be originally Arabic) into German, and acquired a reputation as Julius Fürst.
