= Moses ben Elijah Bashyazi =

Karaite scholar (1537–1555)

Moses ben Elijah Bashyazi (1537–1555) was a Karaite scholar and great-grandson of Elijah Bashyazi. He was born in Constantinople and at 16 years of age, he displayed a remarkable degree of learning and a profound knowledge of foreign languages. He undertook for mere love of knowledge a voyage to the Land of Israel and Syria in order to explore these countries and to collect old manuscripts. Though he died at such an early age, he had composed many works, four of which are extant in manuscript:

1. "Sefer Yehudah" or "Sefer 'Arayot," on prohibited marriages. In this work he enumerates former authors who had written on the same subject, such as Joseph ben Abraham, Jeshua ben Judah, and Aaron ben Elijah.
2. "Zebach Pesach" (The Passover Sacrifice), on the celebration of the festival days, in which he quotes many passages from the Arabic originals of Jeshuah ben Judah's commentary upon the Torah, from the commentary of Jacob Qirqisani, from Jeshuah ben Judah's other works, and from the "Sefer ha-Mizvot" of Daniel al-Kumisi.
3. "Matteh Elohim" (The Rod of God), which contains a history of the Karaite-Rabbinic schism; the chain of Karaite tradition, which the author claims to have received from Japheth ibn Saghir; interpretation of the Torah, and particularly of the precepts which are arranged in numbers according to the Ten Commandments.
4. "Sefer Reuben" (The Book of Reuben), on dogmas and articles of belief.
