= Hayyim Jonah Gurland =

Russian and Hebrew writer

Jonah Hayyim Gurland
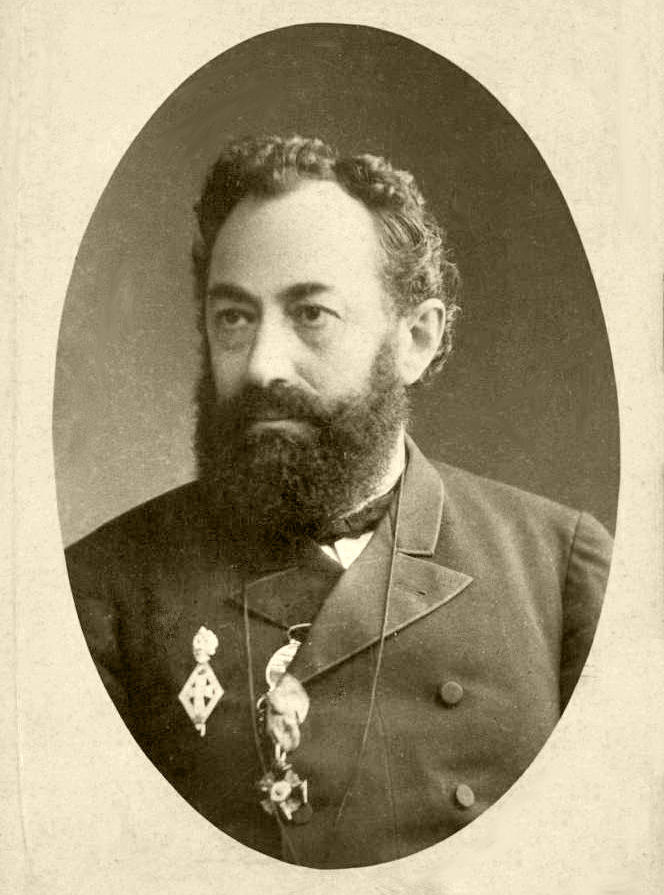
- Haim Jonah Gurland (1885, Odesa)
- Born: 1843
- Died: March 14, 1890 (aged 46–47)
- Occupation: Writer

Jonah Hayyim Gurland (1843 – March 14, 1890) was a Russian and Hebrew writer born at Kleck, government of Minsk. At the age of 10, Gurland entered the rabbinical school of Wilna, from which he graduated as rabbi in 1860. He then went to St. Petersburg and was admitted to attend the lectures of the philological faculty, devoting himself to the study of Semitic languages under the direction of Daniel Chwolson.

During his stay at the university, Gurland translated the fables of Lokman into Russian and published a dissertation on the influence of Arabian philosophy on Moses Maimonides, a subject proposed by the faculty. For his treatment of this, Gurland received a gold medal. In 1864, on obtaining his first degree ("candidatus") from the university, Gurland devoted three years to the study of the Firkovich collection of Karaite manuscripts in the Russian Imperial Library. The result of this study was the publication, in Russian, of a work on the life of Mordecai Comtino and his contemporaries. For this, Gurland was awarded the degree of "magister". Gurland was then charged with the cataloging of the Hebrew books of the Imperial Library.

In 1869, he went to Yekaterinoslav where he was appointed examining magistrate in one of the precincts. In 1873, Gurland was appointed inspector of the normal colleges for teachers at Jitomir, a position which he held for seven years. The government conferred upon him two orders and the title of "college councilor". In 1880, as a consequence of illness, Gurland went to Germany, where he sojourned for three years. On his return, he settled at Odessa and founded there a classic and scientific college of eight classes, with a curriculum including Jewish history and Hebrew literature. In 1888, Gurland was elected government rabbi of Odessa. He died there on March 14, 1890.

== Works ==
Gurland was the author of the following works:

- O Vliyanii Filosofii Musulmanskoi Religii na Filosofiyu Religii Moiseya Maimonida, St. Petersburg, 1863.
- Ma'amar ha-Tammuz, Chwolson's explanation of the term "Tammuz" as it is used by the prophet Ezekiel, translated from German into Hebrew, Lyck, 1864.
- Ginze Yisrael be-Sankt Petersburg, on the Karaite manuscripts of the Imperial Library of St. Petersburg. The work is divided into four parts, containing the following subjects:
1. A description of voyages to Palestine made by three Karaites of the Crimea in the 17th century and 18th century, published at Lyck, 1865
2. A description of the manuscripts of the Imperial Library dealing with mathematics, astronomy, and astrology, published in Russian and German, St. Petersburg, 1866
3. Extracts from the writings of Mordecai Comtino, Caleb Afendopolo, and Abraham Bali, published as an appendix to Gurland's dissertation Novyye Materially dlya Istorii Yevreiskoi Literatury XV Stolyetiya. M. Kumatiano, Yevo Zhizn, Sochineniya i Sootechestvenniki, St. Petersburg, 1866
4. Penine ha-Meliẓot, a collection of sentences, proverbs, and maxims of divers sages, ib. 1867
- Tif'eret le-Mosheh, Gloire à Moïse, in honor of Moses Montefiore, St. Petersburg, 1867.
- Luaḥ Yisrael, a Jewish almanac in Russian and Hebrew, published first (only Russian) at Kiev, 1877; secondly, at Warsaw, 1878; thirdly, at St. Petersburg, 1879; fourthly, ib. 1880.
- Luaḥ Yeshurun, Hebrew and Russian calendar for the year 1884, St. Petersburg, 1883.
- Le-Ḳorot ha-Gezerot be-Yisrael, a collection of memoirs, documents, and elegies on the persecutions of the Jews in Poland in 1648, with historical annotations, published in Oẓar ha-Sifrut, 1887-89.

His brother, Jacob Gurland, rabbi of Poltava, is the author of Kebod ha-Bayit, on the rabbinical school of Wilna, 1858.

== Jewish Encyclopedia bibliography ==
- Sokolov, Sefer Zikkaron, pp. 133 et seq.;
- William Zeitlin, Bibliotheca Hebraica Post-Mendelssohniana p. 131.
