= Israel Meyer Japhet =

Israel Meyer Japhet (7 March 1818—10 November 1892) was a teacher, choir director, and grammarian. He was choir director at the Realschule (Adass Jeschurun) in Frankfurt am Main under Rabbi Samson Raphael Hirsch, and composed music for synagogue use, many pieces of which are still in use today.

== Biography and career ==
Israel Meyer Japhet was born in Kassel, Germany. His parents were Meyer Japhet (1782–1866) and Deborah Weinberg (1783–1843).

At age 17, he attained his first position as a choral director and religious teacher in Wolfhagen. Subsequently, he held a similar position in Gudenberg, where he came into contact with Rabbi Mordechai Wetzlar. Wetzlar had a strong influence on Japhet's development and outlook.

From 1852 to 1892, he was choir director and religious instructor for the Orthodox congregation in Frankfurt am Main.

For his works on grammar he used new methods of teaching in his textbooks.

In Germany, the Reform movement in Judaism was having a great effect on synagogue music. Composers such as Solomon Sulzer and Louis Lewandowski, wanting to emulate the use of music in churches, incorporated organs and mixed choirs into the liturgy of the Reform, and developed an elaborate compositional style. (Orthodox halakha forbids the use of women's voices and the use of musical instruments on the Shabbat.) Japhet introduced choral singing as well, since he agreed that the use of a choir provided a revitalization of synagogue prayer. In keeping within halakha, his choirs consisted solely of men and boys. Aside from halakhic issues, Japhet felt that instruments and elaborate compositions could not compare with the feelings inspired by simple melodies and music. He felt that tunes used by previous generations can be a source of great inspiration, and retained many known liturgical tunes. His liturgical musical compositions were favored because of their simplicity (making them easy to sing), and because so many were based on existing synagogue tunes that were like folk songs. When he published his musical compositions, Shire Jeschurun, the introduction had commendations from noted composers such as Ignaz Lachner, Giacomo Meyerbeer, Louis Spohr, and others.

Japhet died in Frankfurt am Main.

== Family ==
Japhet married Katherine Therese Seckel (1822–1899) and had 2 children, Mathilde (1852–1931) and Samuel (1858–1954). Mathilde married Hermann Schwab (1851–1919), who would edit several later editions of Japhet's publications.

== Publications ==
Nearly all of Japhet's publications were reprinted in later editions (some with revisions) through the 1920s. Listed below are dates of first publication.

- Pi Ollalim: Hebraische Lesefibel. Kassel : T. Fischer, 1839.
- Worte der Wahrheit, oder: Der Thalmud und seine Feinde. Eine Erwiderung auf das von dem Rechtskandidaten F. Eisenberg, unter dem Titel: Dr. Frankel, der Thalmud und die Israëliten, in die Rheinische Zeitung, vom 8. Januar d.J. eingerückte Inserat. Cassel : M.S. Messner [1843?]
- Schire Jeschurun : Gottesdienstliche Gesänge : Eingeführt in die Synagoge der israelitischen Religionsgesellschaft zu Frankfurt am Main. Frankfurt a.M. : Kauffmann
  - Erste Sammlung [1st part]: 1856
  - Zweite Sammlung [2nd part]: 1864. (1st and 2nd parts reprinted together several times through the 20th century)
- Tefilot Yeshurun : meturgamot Ashkenazit milah be-milah ... = Izraʼeliṭishez gebeṭbukh, mit ṿorṭlikhʻer iberzeṭtsung. Frankfurt am Main : Isaak Kauffman, 1857
- Einladugsschrift zu der ... Prüfung der Unterrichts-Anstalt. Frankfurt a.M. : Druckerei von F. Wörner, 1864.
- Über den deutschen Sprachunterricht. Frankfurt a.M., Unterrichts-Anstalt d. Israelit. Religions-Gesellschaft, Schulprogr., 1864
- Metek Sefatayim: Hebräische Sprachlehre mit praktischen Aufgaben; nebst einem Vorkursus und Vokabularium. Frankfurt am Main : Kauffmann, 1868. (10 edition revised by Hermann Schwab, 1921)
- Hebraische Sprachlehre : mit praktischen Aufgaben zum Gebrauche beim Unterrichte in der hebräischen Sprache. Frankfurt am M. : J. Kauffmann, 1878. (4th ed.)
- Ha-Hagadah le-lel Shimurim = Haggadah für Pesach. Frankfurt am Main : J. Kauffmann, 1884. (Revised by Hermann Schwab, 1925).
- Moreh HaKoreh: Die Accente der heiligen Schrift : mit Anschluss der Bücher emet. Frankfurt a.M. : J. Kauffmann, 1896.
