= Abraham Kirimi =

14th-century Crimean rabbi

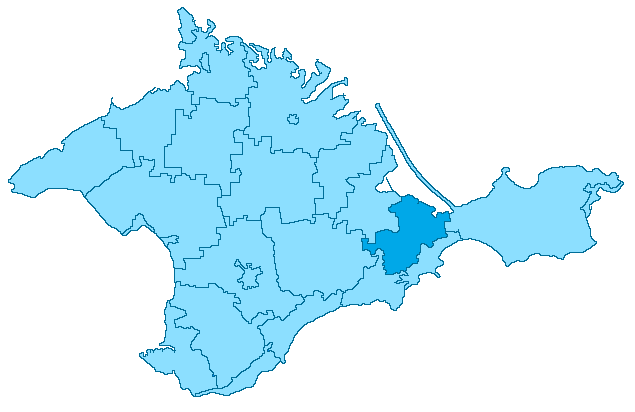
Qırım

Abraham Kirimi (Hebrew: אברהם קירימי; born 1358 in Solhat) was a 14th-century Crimean rabbi.

== Biography ==
According to Firkovich ("C. I. H." No. 50), Kirimi was a proselyte and a student of Aaron ben Joseph the Karaite. He derived his name from his native town of Qırım or Solhat (today's Stary Krym), in Crimea.

Kirimi was the author of Sefat Emet (not to be confused with the book of the same name by Rabbi Yehudah Aryeh Leib Alter), a commentary on the Pentateuch, in which he tries to refute the interpretations of the Karaites when they are in contradiction to those of the Rabbinites. Kirimi says in the preface that he wrote the work at the request of many notable Jews and especially of his Karaite pupil Hezekiah b. Elhanan ha-Nasi,

A part of the preface is in verse, the last two lines of which may be translated:

To the one who asks for the author's name, answer:
Abraham who was born at Kirim. His date is 5118 (1358).
