= Avraham Qanaï =

American Karaite hakham (1946–2021)

Avraham Ben-Raḥamiël Qanaï (אברהם בן-רחמיאל קנאי) (November 25, 1946 - May 30, 2021), whose original surname was Blank, was born to an Ashkenazi Jewish family that hailed from Brooklyn, New York. Qanaï was on his way to India in 1968 with a stopover in Israel when the late Ḥakham Mordecai Alfandari (1929–1999) met him - the first Karaite he came in contact with in his life - and convinced him of the view that Karaite Judaism was the truth. The late Ḥakham Immanuel Massouda (the first Chief Karaite Ḥakham in Israel since 1948) met him shortly afterward and gave him a Ḥakham's cap (hat) as a gift. Qanaï fabricated a story where this registered as his being proclaimed a Ḥakham by Massouda, but this was not at all Massouda's intention (source: Ḥakham Meir Rekhavi).

Avraham Qanaï was the leader of the Congregation Oraḥ Ṣaddiqim in Albany, New York, and a proponent of Karaite Judaism in the United States. He was considered a Ḥakham by many Karaites and Karaite Jewish aspirants. However, the Qaraite Community as a whole and its leadership never recognized him as such.

Qanaï was, from 2005 until 2010, branch secretary of the James Connolly Upstate New York Regional GMB, Industrial Workers of the World of Albany, New York.

Qanaï claimed his original surname was "Bölekçan", but never found/had sources to prove this statement. his presently defunct Karaite community's website. He is a co-author of the book An Introduction to Karaite Judaism: History, Theology, Practice and Custom, which discusses historical and modern Karaite Judaism, as well as editor of numerous Karaite texts published by al-Qirqisani Center for the Promotion of Karaite Studies (http://www.karaitejudaism.com/books/publications.shtml), and translator of numerous Karaite texts, including the Karaite Haggadah, © 2000 & 2003 (ISBN 0-9700775-3-X (pbk.)), The Abbreviated Shabbat Prayer-book According to the Custom of the Karaite Jews (July 2001), and research papers, including A Hebrew Poem by Hakham Shabetai Ben Mordekhai Tiro and Crimean Karaite Jewish Identity in the 20th Century (published in Eastern European Karaites in the Last Generations, ed. D. Y Shapira and Daniel J. Lasker (copyright Jerusalem 2011, Ben-Zvi Institute for Study of Jewish Communities in the East of Yad Ben-Zvi and the Hebrew University of Jerusalem) ISBN 978-965-235-156-2.
