= Elijah Bashyazi =

Crimean Karaite hakham (1420–1490)

Elijah ben Moses Bashyazi of Adrianople or Elijah Bašyazi (in Hebrew: אליהו בן משה בן מנחם; c. 1420 in Adrianople – 1490 in Adrianople) was a Karaite Jewish hakham of the fifteenth century. After being instructed in the Karaite literature and theology of his father (Moses Bashyazi) and grandfather (Menahem Bashyazi), both learned hakhams of the Karaite community of Adrianople, Bashyazi went to Constantinople, where, under the direction of Mordecai Comtino, he studied rabbinical literature as well as mathematics, astronomy, and philosophy, in all of which he soon became most proficient.

== Hakham at Adrianople ==
In 1460 Bashyazi succeeded his father as hakham of the Karaite community at Adrianople. From the many letters addressed by him as representative of the Karaite community of Constantinople, from 1480 to 1484, to Karaim communities in Lutsk and Trakai. Neubauer concludes that Bashyazi resided for most of the time in Constantinople. In these letters he appears as a warm-hearted defender of the Karaite faith. He urges his coreligionists to send young men to Constantinople to study their religious authorities, lest their faith die out, and to lead a pious life; otherwise he would pronounce an anathema on those derelict in their duties. He devoted himself to the improvement of the intellectual condition of the Karaite etc., which, in consequence of internal dissensions on religious matters, was at that time very low.

== Aderet Eliyahu ==
In order to settle the religious laws he compiled a code entitled Aderet Eliyahu (The Mantle of Elijah). This code, which contained both the mandatory and prohibitory precepts, is rightly regarded by the Karaites as the greatest authority on those matters. In it Bashyazi displays a remarkable knowledge, not only of the earliest Karaite writings, but also of all the more important rabbinical works, including those of Saadia Gaon, Abraham ibn Ezra, and Maimonides, whose opinions he discusses.

The "Aderet" is divided into subjects and these again are subdivided into chapters. The subjects treated are: (1) the fixation of the months (42 chapters); (2) the Sabbath (22 chaps.); (3) Passover (10 chaps.); (4) matzah (7 chaps.); (5) the Feast of Weeks (10 chaps.); (6) Rosh Hashannah (2 chaps.); (7) Yom Kippur (5 chaps.); (8) Sukkot (5 chaps.); (9) prayer. This last subject comprises three parts: theology; ethics; and laws concerning prayers, synagogues, slaughtering, clean and unclean, prohibited degrees in marriage, niddah, the years of release and jubilee, the prohibition of Shatnez, and oaths. The last three subjects were completed, after Bashyazi's death, by his disciple, Caleb Afendopolo.

== Theological System ==
Bashyazi's theological system is a masterpiece of clarity and logical precision. Following the example of Judah Hadassi and probably of still older masters of Karaism, he set up ten articles of belief, the veracity of which he demonstrates philosophically as follows:

=== Physical existence ===
(1) All physical existence—that is to say, the celestial spheres and all that they contain—has been created.

==== Views on creation ====
There are two kinds of creations: creation from something else, and creation from nothing. The things now existing are creations from something else, such as the chicken created from the egg; but creation from nothing is by the will of God alone. All compound beings have been produced from the elements and the first matter by the movement of the spheres. But the question is whether the spheres and the first matter were created. The philosophers assert that they are eternal, because, they say, "nothing can be created from nothing." In Bashyazi's opinion this is an error arising from judging the past by the present. The philosophers, knowing of no creation from nothing in their own experience, conclude that such a creation never could have been. Supposing then that they had never seen the chicken emerge from the egg, they might as well maintain that the chicken was eternal, because they could not explain how it lived in the egg. The fact is that inferior beings can not be compared with superior ones which the reason is unable to conceive. In these things reliance must be placed upon revelation, which even philosophyadmits to be true; and all prophets declare that the spheres have been created from nothing.

==== Relies upon Philosophy ====
However, not satisfied with religious proofs only, Bashyazi tries to give philosophical arguments, and being unable to furnish them in the strictly Peripatetic way, he demonstrates his article of belief by Avicenna's theory of "the necessary" and "the possible," which he wrongly attributes to Aristotle. Since philosophy proves that the existence of all beings, except God, is only "possible," the spheres, as well as the first matter, must have been created; otherwise their existence would be a "necessary" one like that of God.

=== God ===
(2) All beings have a creator who has not created himself. This is the corollary of the first article of belief. As it was demonstrated that beings were created, they must have had a creator. All movement presupposes a motor either physical or spiritual. As the heavens are moved by a physical motor, this motor in its turn must have another motor; and so forth until the Prime Mover, God, is reached.

(3) That God has no likeness and is absolutely one. The fact that the existence of God only is necessary proves that He has no likeness. He must also be one; for if there were two beings whose existence was necessary, one of them must have been the cause of the other. In that case there would be only one whose existence was necessary. On the other hand, in supposing each of them to be his own cause, one must have a distinguishing quality which the other does not possess; for if both were identical in all things they would form one; and a being to whom qualities can be attributed is necessarily composed, and must therefore have a creator. As for the attributes of God found in the Bible they must be taken negatively.

=== Prophecy and law ===
(4) God sent Moses. Bashyazi examines prophecy from the philosophical point of view; and, demonstrating it to be true, he claims that there is no hindrance to a belief in Moses' mission.

(5) That He gave through Moses His Torah, which is perfect.

(6) That the believer should know the language and the interpretation of the Law. All the existing translations of the Law have in many passages altered the sense; therefore, the believer must learn the Hebrew language in order to be able to read the Law in the original.

(7) That God inspired the other prophets.

=== Eschatology, reward and punishment ===
(8) That God will raise up the dead on the Day of Judgment. Bashyazi did not undertake to prove article 8 philosophically, accepting the tradition as satisfactory. Moreover, it is made plausible by the fact that God made Adam of clay.

(9) That God rewards and punishes every one according to his merits or demerits. This article of belief being in close connection with Providence and Omniscience, Bashyazi refutes the opinion of certain philosophers who assert that God's knowledge bears only upon the universalities and not upon individual things.

(10) That God did not reject the exiled [Jews], and that although they are suffering, they should hope every day for their deliverance by the Messiah, the son of David.

== Bashyazi's other works ==
The other works of Bashyazi are: (1) Iggeret ha-Tzom (Letter on Fasting on Saturday), divided into three sections. This letter was directed against Solomon Sharbit ha-Zahab, who opposed the opinion of Aaron ben Elijah the Karaite. (2) Iggeret Gid ha-Nashh (Letter on the Sinew Which Shrank, Gen. xxxii. 33), discussing the question whether the prohibition extends to fowl. This, too, was directed against Solomon Sharbit ha-Zahab. (3) Iggeret ha-Yerushah (Letter on Inheritance). These three works have been published by Abraham Firkovich (Eupatoria, 1835) with the second edition of the Aderet. (4) Haluqat ha-Karaim (The Schism of the Karaite). (5) Keli Nehoshet (Tool of Copper), on the use of the astrolabe and its construction, together with a treatise on astronomy. (6) Melitzat ha-Mitzvot (The Precepts in Verses), imitated from the Azharot of Solomon ibn Gabirol. This was published in the Karaite siddur, ed. Vienna, ii. 175. Bashyazi wrote also many prayers which were embodied in the Karaite prayer-book (ed. Vienna, iii. 226).

== Family ==
Elijah Bashyazi's great-grandson was Moses ben Elijah Bashyazi, who was also a Karaite scholar.

== Resources ==
- Mikdash Me'at: An English Language Abridgement of Adderet Eliyahu Translation with commentary, by Tomer Mangoubi, of Khacham Elijah Bashyazi's 15th century masterpiece of Jewish law.
- The Adderet Eliyahu text in Hebrew
- The Yeriot Shelomo text in Hebrew, written by Solomon Afeda Cohen in 1860, which is a widely used Hebrew language abridgment of the Adderet Eliyahu text.
- ; which cites:
  - Julius Fürst, Geschichte des Karäerthums. 1862, pp. 304-310;
  - Avrom Ber Gotlober, Bikoret le-Toledot ha-Kara'im ביקורת לתולדות הקראים, Vilna, 1865, p. 158;
  - Isaak Markus Jost: Geschichte des Judenthums und seiner Sekten, Leipzig, Dörffling und Franke, 1857, ii. 331 et seq.;
  - P. F. Frankl, "Karaiten", in Ersch and Gruber, Encyklopädie, p. 18, note, 1883;
  - Neubauer, Aus der Petersburger Bibliothek, 1866, pp. 60, 140 et seq.
