= Shlomo ben Afeda Ha-Kohen =

Crimean Karaite hakham (1826–1893)

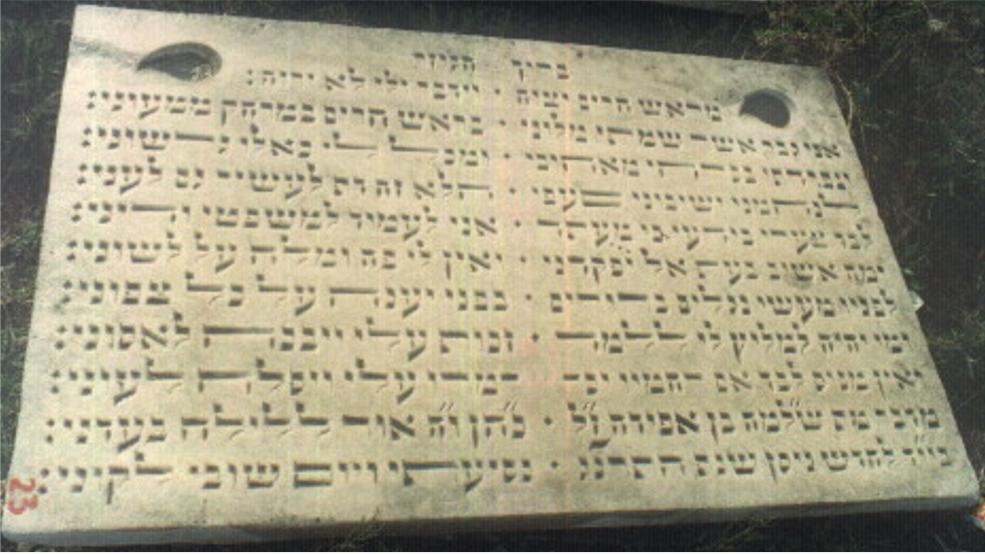
- Tombstone of Solomon Afeda in the Istanbul Karaite Cemetery
- Born: 1826 (or 1836); Constantinople (modern-day Istanbul, Turkey)
- Died: 1893 (aged 66–67); Constantinople
- Notable work: Yeriʻot Shelomoh, Gefen ha-Adderet, Safa Berura
- Family: Family of Shlomo-Yedidia ben Eliezer Afeda Yerushalmi Kohen
- Region: Middle Eastern philosophy
- Main interests: Religious law, Halakha

Shlomo ben Afeda Ha-Kohen or Solomon Afeda Cohen (in Hebrew: שלמה בן אפידה הכהן) (1826–1893) was a Karaite hakham of the 19th century considered the last of the Karaite sages of Constantinople.

He is famous for his two abridgements of Elijah Bashyazi's masterpiece "Aderet Eliyahu" (The Mantle of Elijah): Sefer Gefen Ha-Adderet composed in 1860 and Sefer Yeriot Shelomoh composed in 1862.

Solomon Cohen proposed shortening the prayers of the Karaite festivals with the aim to attract more Karaites to the temple (Knessa). He also worked as a scribe and composed many poems.

== Biography ==
His biography has been reported by Abraham Danon in 1925. He was born in Constantinople in 1826 (5586 in the Hebrew calendar). He learned to read and write in the small communal school from a teacher whose knowledge did not go beyond reading and he left school at a young age. Driven by the love of Jewish studies, he returned to student life under the supervision of his uncle Isaac Cohen who was a hakham. After that, Solomon Cohen did not have recourse to any teacher but studied by himself all the works of the Karaite authors, both printed and manuscript, as well as the works of the Jews of Spain, which he said were "truly inspired by God".

In 1860 and 1862, he wrote his most famous works on the Karaite Halakhah. Having given up his small business to devote himself definitively to his literary career, he was appointed head of the community of the Constantinopolitan Karaites, as well as officiating minister and teacher.

He resigned in 1870 and was replaced by Sabbatai Mengoubi (born about 1835). The following year he left for Cairo (History of the Jews in Egypt Egypt), where he was appointed head of the local Karaite community, and remained there until 1874. His successor, Sabbatai Mengoubi, resigned from his post in Constantinople and went to Cairo to take his place. Solomon Cohen then returned to Constantinople and was again appointed head of the community there (1874–1881).

== Family ==
Shlomo ben Afeda Ha-Kohen and Shlomo-Yedidia ben Eliezer Afeda Yerushalmi Kohen belong to the same family. They belong to the Beghi family of Karaite scholars from Constantinople.

== Resources ==
- Constantinopolitan Karaites
- Mikdash Me'at: An English Language Abridgement of Adderet Eliyahu Translation with commentary, by Tomer Mangoubi, of Khacham Elijah Bashyazi's 15th century masterpiece of Jewish law.
- The Yeriot Shelomo text in Hebrew
- Sefer ha-mitsṿot Gefen ha-Adderet
- Sefer ha-mitsṿot Yeriʻot Shelomoh
