= Salmon ben Jeroham =

10th-century Karaite scholar

Salmon ben Jeroham (Hebrew: שלמון בן ירוחם), also known in Arabic as Sulaym ibn Ruhaym, was a Karaite exegete and controversialist who flourished at Jerusalem between 940 and 960. He was considered one of the greatest authorities among the Karaites, by whom he is called "the Wise" ("HaHakham"), and who mention him after Benjamin Nahawendi in their prayers for their dead great teachers (Karaite Siddur, i. 137b). His principal work, one of several treatises entitled Milhamoth Adonai, was an attack on Saadia Gaon.

== Response to Saadia ==
In a work entitled Milḥamot Adonai, (not to be confused with other books of the same title) of which he produced an Arabic version as well that is no longer in existence, Salmon attempts to counter Rabbinic Judaism, in particular the thinker Saadia Gaon. It is written in verse and is divided into 19 chapters, each of which contains 22 four-lined strophes. After having endeavored in the first two chapters to demonstrate the groundlessness of the Oral Torah, he attempts to refute the seven arguments advanced in its behalf by Saadia in the introduction to his commentary on the Torah. Then he criticizes Saadia's views on the Hebrew calendar, on incest, the celebration of the second days of the feasts, and accuses him of terms of having, in his polemics against the Karaites, used arguments which are in direct opposition to the teachings of the Mishnah and the Talmud, and which consequently he must have known to be false. Most of the book is ad hominem attacks against Saadia.

The Milḥamot Adonai is extant in manuscript in various European libraries; parts of it have been published by Simhah Pinsker, Abraham Geiger, and Raphael Kirchheim.

== Bible commentaries ==
Commentaries on Psalms, Lamentations, Song of Songs, Ecclesiastes and Esther are extant in manuscript. He is known to have composed lost commentaries to Job, Daniel, Ruth, Proverbs, and probably Isaiah and the Pentateuch. Published editions include:

- Psalms 1-10 (Alobaidi 1996) 42-72 (Marwick 1956)
- Lamentations (Feuerstein 1898; Abdul-Karim 1976, dissertation)
- Ecclesiastes (Fraenkel 1903; (Note: Misattributed to Saadia Gaon.) Vajda 1971; Riese 1973, dissertation)
- Esther (Wechsler, forthcoming 2024)
- Ruth (lost; Markon 1927 includes the commentary of Yefet ben Ali, misattributed)
