= Caleb Afendopolo =

Jewish polymath (1464–1523)

Caleb Afendopolo (born at Adrianople December 1, 1464; lived some time at Belgrade, and died March 1523 at Constantinople) was a Karaite polyhistor. He was the brother of Samuel ha-Ramati, ḥakam of the Karaite congregations in Constantinople and of Judah Bali, brother-in-law and disciple of Elijah Bashyatzi.

According to a notice found in a Paris manuscript, he supported himself by giving private instruction; but this is questioned by Steinschneider. A pupil of Mordecai Comtino at Adrianople, Afendopolo attained great proficiency in science, and, while lacking depth and originality of thought, distinguished himself by prolific literary production, based on his large library, that included rare manuscripts, partly bought, partly copied by himself. He continued Adderet Eliyahu (Elijah's Mantle), a work on Karaite law left unfinished in his charge by his teacher, Bashyatzi, in 1490.

The wife of Bashyatzi, who was Afendopolo's sister, having died before her husband, Afendopolo no longer referred to Bashyatzi as his brother-in-law, but called him teacher. Afendopolo died before completing Bashyatzi's treatise.

== Works ==
Afendopolo's own works give a fair insight into the erudition of the Karaites. Fragments only of many of them have been brought to light by Jonah Hayyim Gurland in his Ginze Yisrael (Lyck, 1865), and less exactly by A. Firkovitch. His writings are:

- An introductory index to Aaron ben Elijah's Eẓ ha-Ḥayyim (1497), giving the contents of each chapter under the title, "Derek Eẓ ha-Ḥayyim," published by Delitzsch in his edition (1840) of this work.
- A similar introductory index to Judah Hadassi's Eshkol, under the title Naḥal Eshkol (Koslov, 1836).
- Gan ha-Melek (Garden of the King), his principal work, finished in 1495, a diwan, or collection of poetical essays on love, medicine, and the active intellect.
- 'Asarah Mamarot (Ten Discourses), containing homilies on the Passover lesson (Ex. xii.14); on the Song of Songs as read on the seventh Passover Day; on Psalm cxix, read, according to Karaite custom, on the seven Sabbaths between Passover and Pentecost; and on the Pentecost lesson dealing with the Sinaitic revelation. The introductory chapter, much of which is reproduced by Mordecai ben Nissim in his Dod Mordecai, dwells on the origin of the Karaite schism and the main questions at issue between the Karaites and the Rabbinites (see especially Steinschneider, Leyden Catalogue, pp. 127 et seq.). Afendopolo's view of Jesus given therein is remarkable for its impartial tone. He places Jesus, it is true, a century before the Common Era, but adds: "He was, according to the opinion of the lovers of truth, a wise man, pious, righteous, God-fearing, and shunning evil. Neither did he ever teach any law or practice contrary to the written law. Only after his death, a quarrel arose between his followers and those who had opposed him because of his wisdom, which was rooted in the law and not in their rabbinical additions; and many of these disciples of his, sent forth in his name, introduced practices and teachings altogether foreign to him, removing thereby the corner-stone of the Law, though winning the multitudes. Thus the New Testament originated, which separated the Christians from the Jews."
- Abner ben Ner (1488), a series of Hebrew makamas, or short, rhymed narratives, introducing Saul, David, and the queen of Sheba into the dialogue.
- Under the same title, an allegory on the Song of Songs, the same being applied to the relation of God to Israel.
- Iggeret ha-Sheḥiṭah (1497), a work on the rites used in slaughtering animals, in the form of letters addressed to his son-in-law, Jacob ben Judah; the same in condensed form written at Kramaria near Constantinople (1497).
- Seder 'Inyan Sheḥiṭah, a similar work in rhyme, is extant in manuscript (Firkovitch's MS. No. 569).
- On the use of arrack (in which the passage Deut. xxxii.38 is applied to the Moslems, and the Christian sacrifice is alluded to; see Steinschneider, Leyden Catalogue, p. 233; Polemische Literatur, p. 374).
- Iggeret ha-Kimah (Letter on the Pleiades), treating of forbidden marriages, and directed against Joshua's work on the subject.
- Patshegen Ketab ha-Dat (1496), on the Pentateuch lessons and the Hafṭarot and other Bible selections.
- A rejoinder to Maimonides in defense of the Karaite calculation of the seven weeks (Steinschneider, Hebr. Bibl. vii.11).
- A defense of Aaron ben Elijah's Gan Eden against Moses ben Jacob ha-Ashkenazi (Steinschneider, Hebr. Bibl. xx.122).
- A commentary on the Hebrew translation of the arithmetic of Nicomachus of Gerasa (first or second century), made from the Arabic by Kalonymus ben Kalonymus in 1317. The manuscript is in the Berlin Royal Library (Steinschneider, in Monatsschrift, xxxviii.76). Afendopolo has attached to this commentary a sort of general encyclopedia of the sciences. He commences with an analysis of the eight books of Aristotle's Logic. Practical science, as he calls it, deals with man himself, with the house (family), and the state. Speculative science comprises physics, geometry, and metaphysics. In the same manner he runs through the other sciences, giving their various subdivisions. The highest science is theology, which treats of the soul, of prophecy, and of eschatology. The course of instruction which Afendopolo lays down follows that of Plato; namely, logic, arithmetic, geometry, astronomy, music, the science of aspects, metrology, physics, and metaphysics. After discussing future bliss, he deals with two other sciences—law, especially as regards the relation of faith to works, and controversy (Ḥokmat ha-Debarim). In the latter he cites freely from Batalyusi, without, however, giving his authority (Steinschneider, in Monatsschrift, xl.90 et seq.).
- An astronomical treatise, largely made up of a commentary on the portion of Elijah's Gan Eden (Neubauer, Catalogue, No. 2054), under the title Miklal Yofi.
- Iggeret ha-Maspeḳet, a work on astronomical terminology, and on the construction of sundials, improving upon the method of his teacher, Comtino, by adding the odd hours (Gurland, Ginze Yisrael, iii.18, 19).
- Tiḳḳun Keli Rob ha-Sha'ot (1487), which was known also to Joseph del Medigo.

Afendopolo also wrote some penitential hymns which are to be found in the Karaite Maḥzor (Neubauer, Catalogue, No. 2369, 3; Zunz, G. V., p. 425; idem, 2nd ed., p. 440); but most of these hymns were taken from Rabbinite poets (see David Kahana in Oẓar ha-Sifrut, vol. v, Cracow, 1896). Afendopolo had intended to translate the Elements of Euclid, and to write commentaries on Jabir ibn Aflaḥ's Kitab al-Ḥiyyah (Compendium on Astronomy) and on Ptolemy's Almagest.

== Jewish Encyclopedia bibliography ==
- Julius Fürst, Geschichte des Karäerthums. 1862, ii.301-316;
- Isaak Markus Jost, Gesch. d. Judenthums und seiner Sekten, ii.367;
  - idem, Gesch. d. Israeliten, ix, appendix p. 96;
- Adolf Neubauer. Aus der Petersburger Bibliothek: Beiträge und Documente zur Geschichte des Karäerthums und der karäischen Literatur. Oskar Leiner, 1866. chap. i;
- Gurland, Ginze Yisrael, Lyck, 1865;
- Moritz Steinschneider, in Ersch and Gruber's Encyklopädie, xxvii;
  - idem, Hebr. Uebers. pp. 508, 519, 524, 544;
- Monatsschrift, xxxviii.76;
- Neubauer, Cat. Bodl. Hebr. MSS. Index, col. 928
