= Gudenberg =

Mountain in Germany

Highest point
- Coordinates: 51°21′58.9″N 9°16′17.6″E

Geography
- Location: Hesse, Germany

Gudenberg is a mountain of Hesse, Germany.
