= Adolf Neubauer =

Hungarian Jewish academic (1831–1907)

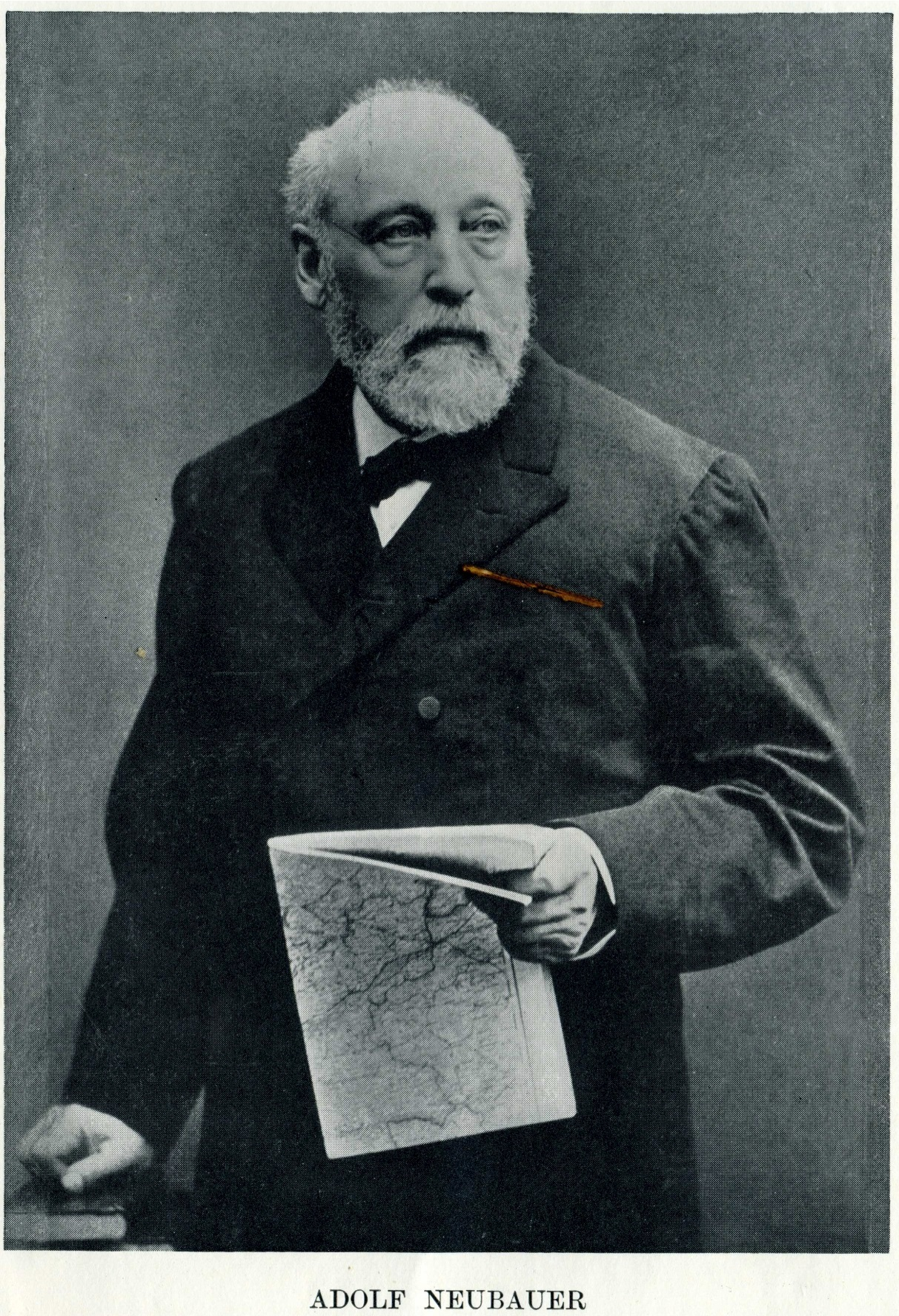
- Born: 11 March 1831; Bittse, Kingdom of Hungary
- Died: 6 April 1907 (aged 76); London, United Kingdom

Academic background
- Education: Oxford University

Academic work
- Discipline: Rabbinic literature
- Institutions: Bodleian Library, Oxford University

Adolf Neubauer (11 March 1831 – 6 April 1907) was a Hungarian-born sublibrarian at the Bodleian Library and reader in Rabbinic Hebrew at Oxford University.

== Biography ==
He was born in Bittse (Nagybiccse), Upper Hungary (now Bytča in Slovakia). The Kingdom of Hungary was then part of the Austrian Empire. He received a thorough education in rabbinical literature.

In 1850, he obtained a position at the Austrian consulate in Jerusalem. At this time, he published articles about the situation of the city's Jewish population, which aroused the anger of some leaders of that community, with whom he became involved in a prolonged controversy.

In 1857, he moved to Paris, where he continued his studies of Judaism and started producing scientific publications. His earliest contributions were made to the Allgemeine Zeitung des Judenthums and the Journal Asiatique (Dec. 1861).

== Works ==
In 1865, he published a volume entitled Meleket ha-Shir, a collection of extracts from manuscripts relating to the principles of Hebrew versification. In 1864, Neubauer was entrusted with a mission to Saint Petersburg to examine the numerous, hitherto unpublished Karaite manuscripts preserved there. As a result of this investigation he published a report in French, and subsequently Aus der Petersburger Bibliothek (1866).

The work which established his reputation, however, was La Géographie du Talmud (1868), an account of the geographical data scattered throughout the Talmud and early Jewish writings and relating to places in the Land of Israel.

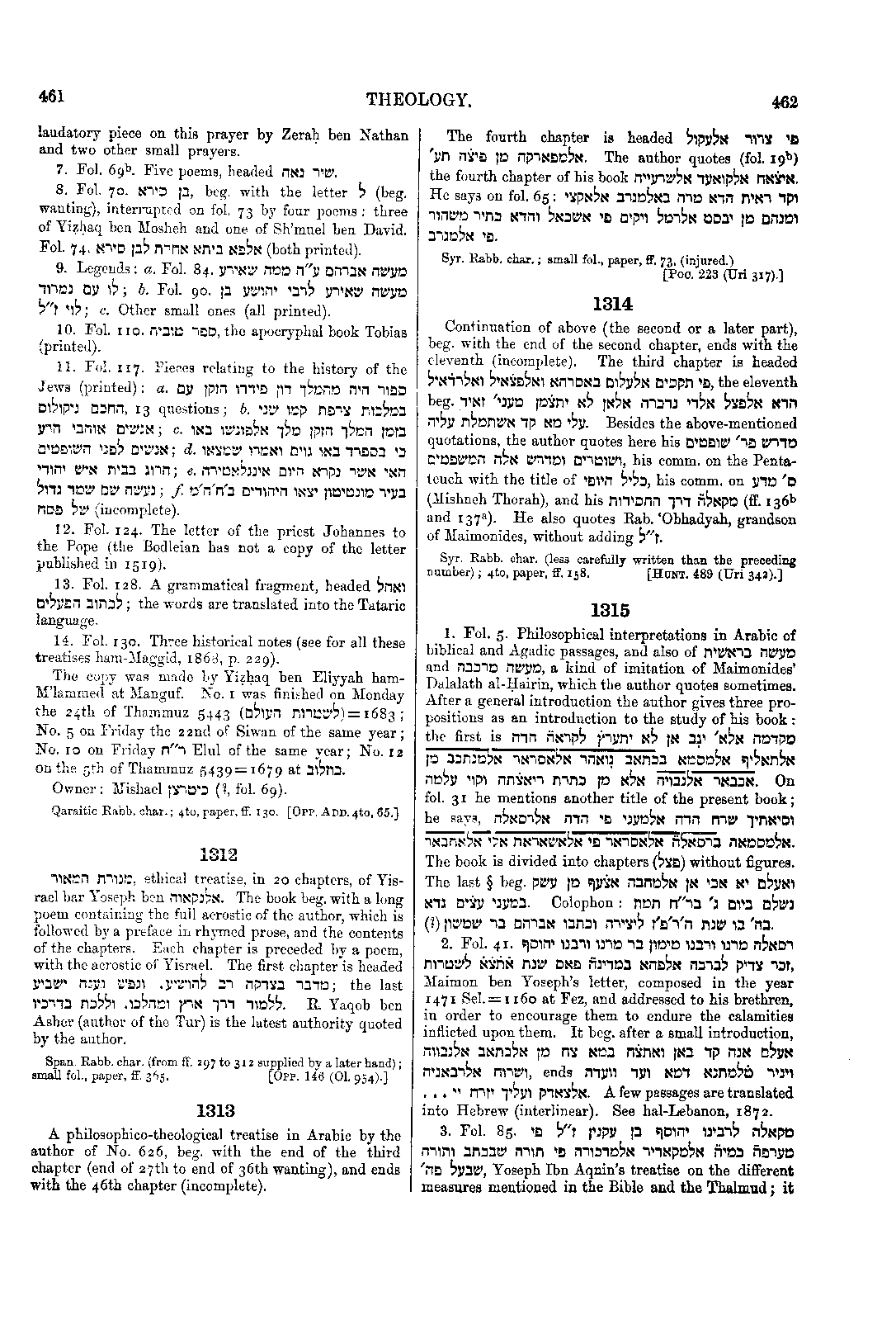
The Catalogue of the Hebrew Manuscripts in the Bodleian Libraries of Oxford by Neubauer (1886). Volume 1 contains approximately 900 such pages.

Starting in 1865, he lived in England and in 1868 his services were secured by the University of Oxford for the task of cataloging the Hebrew manuscripts in the Bodleian Library. The catalog appeared in 1886 after 18 years of preparation. The volume includes more than 2,500 entries, and is accompanied by a portfolio with forty facsimiles.

While engaged in this work Neubauer published other works of considerable importance. He purchased a manuscript of the Samaritan Tolidah for the Bodleian and published its text in 1869. In 1875, he edited the Arabic text of the Hebrew dictionary of Abu al-Walid (the Book of Hebrew Roots), and in 1876 published Jewish Interpretations of the Fifty-third Chapter of Isaiah, which was edited by Neubauer and translated by Samuel Rolles Driver jointly in 1877.

Also in 1877, he contributed Les Rabbins Français du Commencement du XIVe Siècle to L'Histoire Littéraire de la France, though, according to the rules of the French Academy, it appeared under the name of Renan.

In 1878, Neubauer edited the Aramaic text of the Book of Tobit; in 1887, the volume entitled Mediæval Jewish Chronicles (vol. ii., 1895); and in 1897, with Cowley, The Original Hebrew of a Portion of Ecclesiasticus.

In 1892, together with Stern, he published a German translation of a medieval chronicle of the First Crusade: Hebräische Berichte über die Judenverfolgungen Während der Kreuzzüge.

He was the first to discover a fragment of the Hebrew text of Ben Sira.

In 1884, a readership in Rabbinic Hebrew was founded at Oxford, and Neubauer was appointed to the post, which he held for 16 years until failing eyesight compelled his resignation in May 1900. Neubauer's chief fame has been won as a librarian, in which capacity he enriched the Bodleian with many priceless treasures, displaying great judgment in their acquisition. Among other things he acquired manuscripts from the Cairo geniza as well as Yemenite manuscripts.

He received the M.A. degree at Oxford in 1873 and was elected an honorary fellow of Exeter College in 1890. In the latter year, he received the honorary degree of PhD from the University of Heidelberg and was made an honorary member of the Real Academia de la Historia at Madrid.
