= Yefet ben Ali =

10th-century Karaite Bible commentator

- Era: 10th century CE
- Known for: Commentator on the Bible

Yefet ben Ali (Hebrew: יפת בן עלי הלוי (הבצרי)) was perhaps the foremost Karaite commentator on the Bible, during the "Golden Age of Karaism". He lived about 95 years, c. 914-1009. Born in Basra in the Abbasid Caliphate (now in Iraq), he later moved to Jerusalem between 950 and 980, where he died. The Karaites distinguished him by the epithet maskil ha-Golah (teacher of the Exile).

His commentaries were written in Judeo-Arabic, and covered the entire Hebrew Bible. They were accompanied by a very literal translation of the Hebrew text, which often violated the rules of Arabic grammar. These writings influenced the rabbinical sage Abraham ibn Ezra, who quotes Yefet forty-two times in his commentary of the minor prophets.

== Approach ==
Yefet's commentary is largely a compilation of others' views, though he also includes many original interpretations, but in general his Karaite sources are lost. Unlike his Karaite predecessors in the field of Bible exegesis, Yefet realized the importance of grammar and lexicography for the interpretation of Scripture, although he did not excel in either. The interest which his commentaries present lies chiefly in the accumulation of material for the history of the differences between traditional Judaism and the Karaites; for he enters into lengthy disputes with traditional rabbis, especially with Saadia, from whose commentaries on the Bible and polemical works, including some no longer in existence, he gives many extracts. Thus in regard to Ex. xxxv. 3 he discusses with Saadia the kindling of a fire by a non-Jew on Sabbath, a practise which the Karaites considered to be forbidden. Yefet reproaches Saadia with being unfaithful to the principles he himself had laid down for the interpretation of the Law, according to which no deductions by analogy are admissible in definite revealed precepts. On Lev. xxiii. 5 Yefet cites fragments from Saadia's "Kitab al-Tamyiz", a polemical work against Karaism, in which the author states that there are three sects which are divided on the question of the new moon: (1) the Rabbinites, who, except in special cases, determine it by the molad; (2) the sect of the Tiflis, which follow the molad absolutely; and (3) a sect which is guided by the first appearance of the moon.

== Exegesis ==
Yefet claims full freedom for the exegete, refusing to admit any authority for the interpretation of the Torah; and, although he sometimes uses the thirteen hermeneutic rules laid down in the Mishnah, he denies their authority: they are to be applied, he claims, only when it is not possible to explain the passage literally. Thus, notwithstanding his veneration for Anan ben David, the founder of Karaism, and for Benjamin Nahawandi, he often rejects their interpretations. He follows the Targum very closely (he is the first known Karaite commentator to do so), though he never acknowledges it as a source, and he quotes Talmudic teachings frequently, likewise without attribution. In his style and idioms also he bears a deep debt to Talmudic writings, and his interpretations are very often borrowed from the exegetical works of Saadia Gaon or the doctrines of Mutazilism.

Yefet was an adversary of the philosophico-allegorical treatment of scripture. He, however, symbolizes several Biblical narrations, as, for instance, that of the burning bush, in which he finds a representation of Jews, whom enemies can not annihilate; and he admits that the Song of Songs is an allegory.

Yefet attacked Islam with the greatest violence. For him the words of Isaiah, "Ha, you ravager" (Book of Isaiah 33:1), refer to Muhammad, who robbed all nations and dealt treacherously with his own people, and Isaiah 47:9 ("Suddenly, in one day: / Loss of children and widowhood / Shall come upon you in full measure") to the downfall of Islam. In the following verse, he sees an allusion to the sufferings inflicted by Muslim rulers on the Jews, who are loaded with heavy taxes, compelled to wear badges, forbidden to ride on horseback, etc.

Yefet was no less bitter in his attacks on Christianity and on rabbinic Judaism, to which he refers many prophecies. Unlike his predecessors, he was not an opponent of secular science. To him the word "da'at" (Proverbs 1:7) denotes "the knowledge" of astronomy, medicine, mathematics, etc., the study of which is to be undertaken before that of theology.

== Influence ==
Yefet's commentaries were much used by succeeding Karaite exegetes and were often quoted by Abraham Ibn Ezra. Written in Arabic, some of them were rendered into Hebrew either in full or abridged.

== Editions ==
Nearly the whole Arabic text on all the Biblical books is extant in manuscripts in European libraries (Leiden, Oxford, British Museum, London, Paris, Berlin, etc.). The parts which have been published are:

- Genesis 1:1-5 (Stroumsa 2000) 11:10-25:18 (Zawanowska 2012) Joseph Narratives (Polliack, announced) Babel and Binding of Isaac (Zawanowska 2022)
- Numbers Balaam poetry (Avni 2003)
- Deuteronomy 32 (Sokolow 1974, dissertation)
- Joshua (Robinson 2015)
- Judges (Wechsler, announced)
- Jeremiah (P. D. Wendkos 1969, dissertation; Joshua A. Sabih 2009, 2013)
- Hosea (Schroeter 1867; (Note: Then anonymous.) Tottermann 1880; Birnbaum 1942, dissertation; Polliack and Schlossberg 2009)
- Joel (Schroeter 1871; (Note: Then anonymous.) Klein 1897; Lehrman 1927, dissertation; Marwick 2003)
- Amos (Tomal 2000, dissertation; Marwick 2003; Nadler-Akirav 2009, dissertation, 2021)
- Obadiah (Friedmann 1901; (Note: Then anonymous.) Polliack and Schlossberg 2002)
- Jonah (Marwick 2003; Schlossberg 2004; Andruss 2007, M.A. thesis)
- Micah (Szadzunski 1937, dissertation; (Note: Eleazar Iser Szadzunski is the E. Lawrence Marwick whose preliminary edition of the commentary to the Minor Prophets was published posthumously in 2003. His dissertation is possibly lost.) Marwick 2003)
- Nahum (Hirschfeld 1911)
- Habakkuk (Livne-Kafri 1993)
- Zephaniah (Heisz 1902; (Note: Then anonymous.) Polliack and Schlossberg, 2020)
- Haggai (Nadler-Akirav 2021)
- Zechariah (de Vreugd, announced)
- Malachi (Nadler-Akirav 2021)
- Psalms (Bargès 1846, 1861; ben-Shammai 1976)
- Proverbs (Z. Auerbach 1866; E. Günzig 1898; Sasson 2015)
- Job (ben-Shammai 1969, M.A. thesis; Hussain 1987, dissertation; Sadan 2020)
- Song of Songs (Jung 1867; Bargès 1884; Alobaidi 2010)
- Ruth (N. Schorstein 1903, dissertation; Markon 1927; (Note: Byzantine translation of, misattributed to Salmon ben Yeruham.) Nemoy 1952; Butbul 2003)
- Ecclesiastes (Bland 1966; Vajda 1971; ben-Shammai 1976)
- Esther (Wechsler 2006, dissertation, 2008)
- Daniel (Margoliouth 1889)

== Other works ==
He was also known for his expertise of Hebrew grammar, and for his polemics against Rabbinic Judaism, Islam, and Christianity. One of his comments about the Rabbanites, writing on his Arabic commentary on Isaiah, Yefet ben Ali digresses as follows: "This section refers to the people of the Diaspora and to the best among them as well. They are at present divided into four classes :

1. The Exilarchs who pretend to be the possessors of knowledge;
2. The common people who neither desire wisdom nor think about it; they know no more about religion than to go to the Synagogue from Sabbath to Sabbath and to say "Amen" and "Shema Yisrael";
3. The studious among the common people, whom the Exilarchs teach them the nonsense of the Talmud, and sorcery, instead of what might profit them;
4. The "Maskilim" (Karaite teachers) who, endowed with the knowledge of the Torah, are generous with the dissemination of their wisdom, in return for which they accept no recompense).

Before devoting himself to Biblical exegesis Yefet wrote several other works of lesser importance. Among these were:

- an epistle in rimed prose refuting the criticism on Karaism by Jacob ben Samuel, surnamed by the Karaites "ha-'Iḳḳesh" (= "the intriguer"), published by Pinsker in his "Liḳḳuṭe Ḳadmoniyyot", p. 19. Yefet endeavors in this epistle to demonstrate that there is no trace of oral tradition in Scripture, and consequently the Mishnah, Talmud, and other rabbinical writings fall under the prohibition "Ye shall not add unto the word which I command you" (Deut. iv. 2).
- "Sefer ha-Miẓwot", treating of the precepts, and containing many controversies with the Rabbinites; mentioned by Yefet in the commentaries to I Sam. xx. 27; Dan. x. 3. Some fragments of this work were found in the Library of St. Petersburg and published by A. Harkavy.
- "'Iyyun Tefillah", in ten chapters, treating of all that pertains to prayer; extant in manuscript (Paris MS. No. 670).
- "Kalam", perhaps a liturgical work, extant in manuscript. Levi, Yefet's son, mentions in his "Muḳaddimah" to Deuteronomy another work by his father, entitled "Safah Berurah", the contents of which are unknown (the supposition of Fürst that it was a grammatical treatise is considered to be erroneous).
