= Aaron ben Elijah =

Karaite theologian (1328/29–1369)

- Born: c. 1328; Nicomedia (now İzmit, Kocaeli, Turkey)
- Died: 1369; Constantinople (modern-day Istanbul, Turkey)
- Known for: Karaite theology

Aaron ben Elijah (Hebrew: אהרון בן אליהו האחרון 1328/1329 – 1369) is often considered to be the most prominent Karaite Jewish theologian. (Note: ...theologian of Constantinople (now Istanbul), the only scholar to seek a philosophical basis for Karaite beliefs.) He is referred to as "the Younger" to distinguish him from Aaron ben Joseph of Constantinople. Even though Aaron lived for much of his life in Constantinople, it was the centre of Karaism and he is sometimes distinguished from another theologian known as Aaron ben Elijah of Constantinople by the title "of Nicomedia" another place he lived.

== Background ==
He was born in Nicomedia. While little is known about his personal life, he is considered by Karaites to be the equivalent of his contemporary, Maimonides, the most distinguished Jewish scholar of the time and an outspoken critic of the Karaites. In fact, it seems likely that Aaron made it his ambition to rival Maimonides by defending the Karaites from his attacks. To achieve this, he studied the extensive religious literature of both rabbinical Judaism and Islam, as well as that of the Karaites.

The result of his studies was the 1346 Etz HaChayyim "Tree of Life", a philosophical work modeled after Maimonides' Guide to the Perplexed) One of the chief criticisms of the work is that it attempts to imitate Maimonides' Guide far too slavishly in terms of structure and style. In 1354, while living in Constantinople, he composed his second major work, Gan Eden "Garden of Eden", about the commandments of the Hebrew Bible and an attempt to defend the Karaite legal code and in 1362 he wrote Keter Torah "Crown of the Torah", a comprehensive commentary on the Hebrew Bible using a literal interpretation of the writings. He died in Constantinople in the Byzantine Empire.

Aaron was neither as profound nor independent-minded as Maimonides, for whom he maintained great esteem even when opposing him. Nevertheless, he was a versatile compiler and eclectic, if not always original, philosopher who restored some prestige to the Karaite community, which had declined since it was forced to fend off the attacks of Saadia Gaon. Furthermore, some of his critiques of the Maimonidean worldview can be considered reasonable and sound.

== Aaron's philosophy ==
Aaron ben Elijah was heavily influenced by the works of Aristotle. Unlike Maimonides, however, Aaron accepted the Muslim Motazilite philosophical system of Kalam, combining atomism with Aristotelian views to reconcile revelation with philosophy — in this, he differed not only from Maimonides but also from Aaron Ben Joseph, the Elder, who sided with Maimonides in this debate. According to the younger Aaron, in the first chapters of Etz HaChayyim, the theology of the Kalam is the natural religion arrived at by Abraham through meditation and systematized by the Mosaic Law; while Greek philosophy, adopted by Christianity because of its hostility to Judaism, is a heterogeneous foreign product, harmful to the development of the Torah in its purity. He then declares that the object of his work is to restore the theology of the Kalam by presenting it in a clear manner.

=== Etz HaChayyim ===
The book Etz HaChayyim (Tree of Life) was written in 1346 and consists of 114 chapters:

- Chapters 1–15 discuss the doctrine of God's existence, God's incorporeality, and the creation of the world. Like Maimonides' Guide, he considers the heavenly spheres to be governed by separate intelligences, or angels. By showing that his conclusions are nothing more than logical deductions, Aaron argues that they precede his own work, which is nothing more than the confirmation of established truths.
- Chapters 16–62 discuss biblical anthropomorphism, explaining them as figurative expressions of Divine energy and activity. In these chapters, he often cites Maimonides verbatim, but claims that Maimonides himself was simply following an even earlier work, Ha-Eshkol, by Judah Hadassi. Aaron follows Maimonides' example in stating that Ezekiel's theophany of the Divine Chariot, like the descriptions of the Tabernacle and its symbolism, has a physical meaning.
- Chapters 63–77 discuss the unity of God. Here Aaron opposes the approach of both Maimonides and Hadassi, who reject all but God's negative attributes (God is not...). According to Aaron, however, power, knowledge, life, will, and existence are all positive attributes inseparable from the very essence of God and in no way infringing upon His unity. This leads him to an explanation of the usual names of God denoting God's activity, as distinguished from the Tetragrammaton, which denotes the essence of God as the author of all existence.
- Chapters 78–94 discuss the concept of Divine Providence. Special emphasis is placed on the fourfold nature of evil: physical, psychical, moral, and non-moral. This was a favorite topic of older Karaite philosophers such as Joseph al-Bazir (and of Maimonides), that evil is only a defect inherent in matter, and therefore not to be ascribed to God, unless God makes it the means of man's moral improvement. While Maimonides assumes that God's providence extends only to rational human beings, Aaron extends Divine providence to all beings, since God's universal knowledge embraces all. Whereas Maimonides sees Divine action as guides by God's wisdom, according to Aaron, it is guided by God's justice.

Accentuating the superiority of moral over intellectual power, Aaron takes a higher view of the question of why the righteous suffer than either Maimonides or some of his own Karaite predecessors. He rejects the concept of temurah, or compensation for grief, postulating instead that all trials imposed on people are for their spiritual benefit (citing Abraham and Job as examples of this). Humanity is incapable of comprehending the purpose of Creation, being limited to conceiving of its own role in the world as God's servant.

- Chapters 95–114 discuss revelation, the Divine Law of the Torah, the perfection of the soul, and its immortality. The two trees in the Garden of Eden are seen as metaphors for the higher and the lower spheres of human existence. After the Fall, the commandments of the Torah become necessary means of restoring humanity to its true, twofold nature. This leads to a discussion of the nature of prophecy in general and its highest degree, as attained by Moses. It continues by explaining the objectives of the Torah and its commandments as means of achieving the perfection of both the individual and of humanity as a whole.

According to an ancient tradition of both Karaite and Rabbinic Jews and cited by Aaron, the Torah was intended for and offered to all nations. It can never be changed, improved, or (in contrast to Rabbinic Judaism) augmented by an Oral Law. Essentially different from the attitude of Maimonides, and in fact from that of all Aristotelian thinkers, is Aaron's attitude toward immortality, which he bases chiefly upon moral grounds, citing the idea of retribution. For this reason, however, his eschatology is rather obscure, being a semi-rational, semi-mystical blend of many different beliefs. He concludes his work with a call to repentance.

=== Gan Eden ===
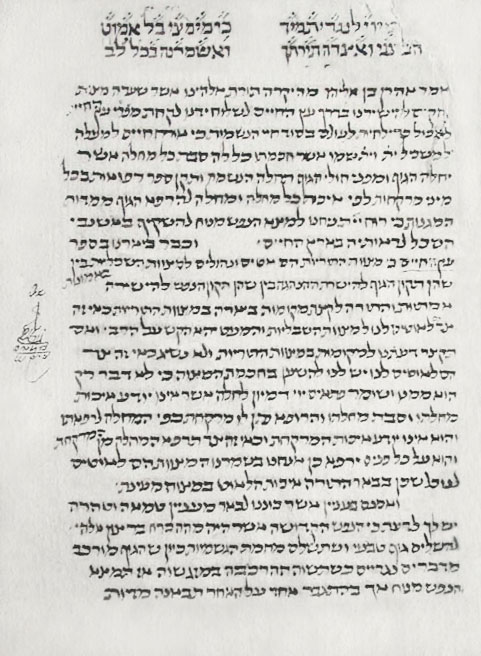
Gan Eden, by Aaron ben Elijah. Manuscript on paper, dating around the 14th or 15th century. Oriental semi-cursive script.

Aaron's work on the Commandments, entitled Gan Eden (The Garden of Eden), consists of twenty-five sections and 194 chapters, as well as nine smaller juridical articles, which became of paramount importance to the Karaites. It was written in 1354. He follows a rational approach to the commandments, similar to the one espoused by Maimonides. He opens with the principle that instilling the belief in God's unity, and especially in His government of the world, is the ultimate purpose of every commandment, so that it is the duty of humanity to seek the underlying objective of each commandment. For example, the goal of the Sabbath is inculcating a belief in the Divine creation and guidance of the world; other festivals are intended to counteract the influences of paganism and fatalism.

Two parts of Gan Eden have appeared as separate books:

- One, consisting of five sections and twenty-two chapters on shechita (the laws of slaughtering animals for food)
- Tzafnat Paneach ("Discloser of Secrets") consists of eight chapters on incestuous marriages.

In its entirety, Gan Eden is probably the best and most comprehensive exposition of the Karaite system of the Law, presenting the opinions of all Aaron's predecessors with impartial and frank criticism. It is mainly because of this work that Aaron continues to wield such a great influence upon the Karaites.

=== Keter Torah ===
His third book was titled Keter Torah (Crown of Law) and was written in 1362. This is a commentary on the Torah, styled after Abraham Ibn Ezra's earlier work. Like all of Aaron's earlier writings, it also contains a review of the philosophical and exegetical interpretations given by his predecessors, with critiques of their views where necessary. Particularly interesting is his "Preface," in which he states the main differences between the approach to biblical exegesis of Rabbinic and Karaite Judaism.

== Editions of Aaron's works ==
The 'Etz ha-Ḥayyim, of which many manuscripts exist in Leiden, Munich, Vienna, and Leipzig, was first published, with a large commentary (Or ha-Ḥayyim) by Luzki, in Koslov, 1835. A critical edition, with valuable information and a summary of the one hundred and fourteen chapters in Hebrew by Caleb Afendopulo, and one in German by the editor, Franz Delitzsch, appeared in Leipzig, 1841. Of the Keter Torah there is extant a Eupatoria edition (1866), besides manuscripts in the Bodleian Library, Oxford, in Vienna, and in Leipzig; The Gan Eden was published in Eupatoria at 1866. Manuscripts exist in Leiden and Leipzig and more. Portions of the latter have been published by Schupart, Trigland, Danz, and Langhausen.
