= Judah Hadassi =

12-century Karaite scholar and liturgist

Judah ben Elijah Hadassi (in Hebrew, Yehuda ben Eliyahu) was a Karaite Jewish scholar, controversialist, and liturgist who flourished at Constantinople in the middle of the twelfth century. He was known by the nickname "ha-Abel," which signifies "mourner of Zion." Neubauer thinks that "Hadassi" means "native of Edessa"

Nothing of Hadassi's life is known except that he was the pupil of his elder brother Nathan Hadassi.

He dealt with Hebrew grammar, Masorah, theology, and philosophy, and knew Arabic and Greek well.

== Eshkol ha-Kofer ==
Hadassi acquired his reputation through his treatise Eshkol ha-Kofer or Sefer ha-Peles, on which he began work on 10 November 1148.

It is a treatise on the Ten Commandments, in which the author endeavored to explain them philosophically, and in which he applied all his analytical talent and scholarship. He starts from the premise that all laws contained in the Pentateuch, and those added by the Rabbis, as well as the minor ethical laws by which the Jews regulate their daily life, are implied in the Ten Commandments. Hadassi enumerates, under the head of each of the Ten Commandments, a complete series of coordinate laws; and the whole work is mapped out according to this plan.

The work embodies not only much of the science of his time, but even legends and folk-lore, so that it has appropriately been termed "a sea of learning."

It is written in rhymed prose, the general rhyme throughout the work being ך; and the initial letters of the successive verses form alternately the acrostics of אבגד and תשרק, repeated 379 times. The alphabetic chapters 105-124 are, however, in the regular form of poems.

The first commandment (alphabets 1-95) affirms the existence of God and covers the duties of the created toward the Creator, dealing, for instance, with prayer, repentance, future punishment and reward, and resurrection. Beginning with alphabet 35, Hadassi considers the nature of God, of creation, of angels, of the celestial bodies, etc. In fact, this part of the work is a compendium of religious philosophy, astronomy, physics, natural history, geography, and folk-lore.

The second commandment (alphabets 96-129) affirms the unity of God. Here Hadassi refutes the views of other sects; for example, the Christians, Rabbinites, Samaritans, and Sadducees, who maintain the eternity of the world. He is indignant at those who identify the Karaites with the Sadducees, and shows great animosity toward the Rabbinites. Alphabets 99-100 contain a violent attack upon Christianity.

The third commandment (alphabets 130-143) and the fourth commandment (alphabets 144-248) cover laws concerning the Sabbath, and the holidays and the laws connected with them, as those relating to sacrifices, which include all laws concerning the kohanim, slaughtering, tzitzit, etc.

This part is the more important as it contains Hadassi's views on exegesis and grammar. To be able to discuss with the Rabbinites the kinds of work permitted or forbidden on the Sabbath, he was obliged to state his own exegetical rules and show that Karaites are not inferior to the Rabbinites as exegetes. After giving the thirteen rules ("middot") of R. Ishmael ben Elisha and the thirty-two of R. Eliezer ben Jose ha-Gelili, he gives his own, dividing them into two groups, one of sixty and one of eighty, and finding allusion to them in the Song of Solomon vi. 8. The sixty "queens" denote the sixty grammatical rules, headed by five "kings" (the five vowels); the eighty "concubines" denote the eighty exegetical rules; and the "virgins without number" represent the numberless grammatical forms in the Hebrew language.

Considering phonetics as necessary for the interpretation of the Law, Hadassi devotes to this study a long treatise, in the form of questions and answers.

The fifth commandment (alphabets 249-264) covers laws regulating the relations between parents and children, inheritance, mourning, etc.

The sixth commandment (alphabets 265-274) and the seventh commandment (alphabets 275-336) cover laws concerning adultery, incest, cleanliness and uncleanliness, women in childbirth, and the fruit of the first three years.

The eighth commandment (alphabets 337-353) covers laws on the different kinds of theft and fraud.

The ninth commandment (alphabets 354-362) discusses all kinds of false witnesses, including false prophets.

Finally, the tenth commandment (alphabets 363-379) deals with the laws implied in the prohibition against covetousness.

Hadassi illustrates his explanations with examples interspersed with tales and legends.

== Model and sources ==
Obviously his model was Nissim ben Noah's Bitan ha-Maskilim, or Peles Bi'ur ha-Mitzvot, written 370 years earlier.

The sources upon which he drew included the Ma'aseh Bereshit of R. Ishmael ben Elisha; the Baraita of R. Samuel of Nehardea, for astronomy; the Josippon for history; David ben Merwan al-Mukkamas' work on the sects; Eldad ha-Dani, for legends; while for grammar he utilized especially the Karaite grammarians, though he also made use of the Rabbanites, quoting Judah Hayyuj and ibn Janah. One should also note that Hadassi included in his "Eshkol" the first grammatical work of Abraham ibn Ezra, without acknowledgment.

In attacking the Rabbanites, he followed the example of his predecessors, as Solomon ben Jeroham, Japheth ben Ali, Sahl ben Matzliah, and others.

This work was printed at Eupatoria (1836), with an introduction by Caleb Afendopolo entitled Nahal Eshkol. Alphabets 99-100 and part of 98 were excluded from this edition by the censor, but have been published by Bacher in J. Q. R. Hadassi mentions a previously written work of his entitled Sefer Teren bi-Teren, a collection of homonyms which, he says, was an addition to the eighty pairs of Ben Asher (alphabets 163 ב, 168 ס, 173 נ). There exists also a fragment which Abraham Firkovich entitled Sefer ha-Yalqut and attributed to Hadassi, while Pinsker regarded it as an extract from Tobiah's Sefer ha-Mitzvot. P. F. Frankl, however, agreed with Firkovich in regarding it as a part of the "Eshkol ha-Kofer," which Hadassi had previously written in prose.

In the Karaite Siddur there are four piyyutim by Hadassi.

== Resources ==
, which cites the following bibliography:

- Pinsker, Liḳḳuṭe Ḳadmoniyyot, p. 223; Supplement, p. 93;
- Isaak Markus Jost: Geschichte des Judenthums und seiner Sekten, Leipzig, Dörffling und Franke, 1857, ii. 352 et seq.;
- Julius Fürst, Geschichte des Karäerthums. 1862, ii. 211 et seq.:
- P. F. Frankl, in Monatsschrift, xxxi. 1-13, 72-85;
- Bacher, ib. xl. 14, 68, 109;
- J. Q. R. viii. 431 et seq.;
- Avrom Ber Gotlober, Bikoret le-Toledot ha-Kara'im ביקורת לתולדות הקראים, Vilna, 1865, p. 172;
- introduction to Eshkol ha-Kofer by Caleb Afendopolo, entitled Nahal Eshkol
