= Julius Fürst =

Jewish German orientalist (1805–1873)

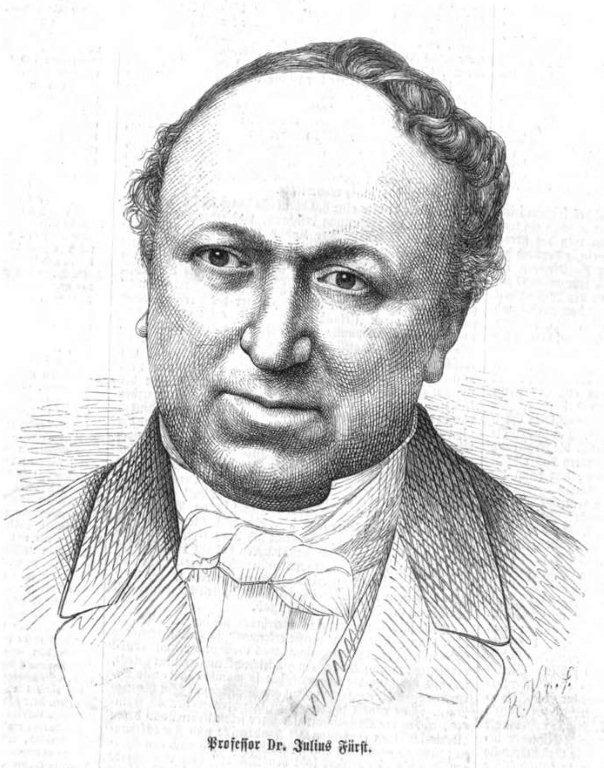
Julius Fürst

Julius Fürst (German: [fʏʁst]; 12 May 1805, Żerków, South Prussia – 9 February 1873, Leipzig), born Joseph Alsari, was a Jewish German orientalist and the son of noted maggid, teacher, and Hebrew grammarian Jacob Alsari. Fürst was a distinguished scholar of Semitic languages and literature. During his years as professor in the department of oriental languages and literature at the University of Leipzig (1864–1873), he wrote many works on literary history and linguistics.

== Biography ==
His father was Hebrew grammarian Jacob Alsari. At an early age, Fürst had a remarkable knowledge of Hebrew literature, Old Testament scriptures and oriental languages. In 1825, after having studied at Berlin, where Hegel and Neander were among his teachers, he took a course in Jewish theology at Posen. In 1829, after having abandoned his Jewish orthodoxy, he went to Breslau, and in 1831 to Halle. Here he took his degree in oriental languages and theology under Gesenius in 1832.

In 1833 he became a journalist in Leipzig, later securing a position as tutor and lecturer (privat-docent) in the university there (lecturing on Chaldaic, Syriac, Hebrew grammar and literature, Biblical exegesis, etc.), from which position he was promoted in 1864 to professor of oriental languages and literature. He filled this post until his death, and during his tenure there he was also elected to several scientific societies.

As one of the exponents of the University of Leipzig's academic scholarly milieu throughout his adult life he was also a contemporary, a friend, and a sometimes collaborator of Leipzig's own native Lutheran scholar and professor Franz Delitsch. Fürst was 8 years Delitsch's senior.

Fürst was chief editor of Der Orient (Leipzig 1840-1851), a periodical dedicated to scientific study of the language, literature and history of the Jews.

== Works ==
- Lehrgebäude der aramaischen Idiome ("A system for Aramic dialects," 1835)
- Concordantiae librorum Sacrorum veteris Testamenti Hebraicae et Chaldaicae (1837–40)
- Kultur and Literaturgeschichte der Juden in Asien ("Cultural and literary history of Jews in Asia," 1849)
- Hebräisches und Chaldäisches Handwörterbuch ("Portable dictionary for Hebrew and Chaldaic," 1857-61)
- Geschichte des Karäerthums (1862–65)
- Fürst, Julius (1863). Bibliotheca Judaica (in German). Vol. 1 (New ed.). Leipzig: Wilhelm Engelmann.
- Fürst, Julius (1863). Bibliotheca Judaica (in German). Vol. 2 (New ed.). Leipzig: Wilhelm Engelmann.
- Fürst, Julius (1863). Bibliotheca Judaica (in German). Vol. 3 (New ed.). Leipzig: Wilhelm Engelmann.
- Geschichte der biblischen Litteratur und des jüdisch-hellenistischen Schrifttums ("History of Biblical literature and Jewish-Hellenic writings," 1867-70)
