= Crimean Karaites =

Ethnoreligious group

Karaites къарайлар, karajlar
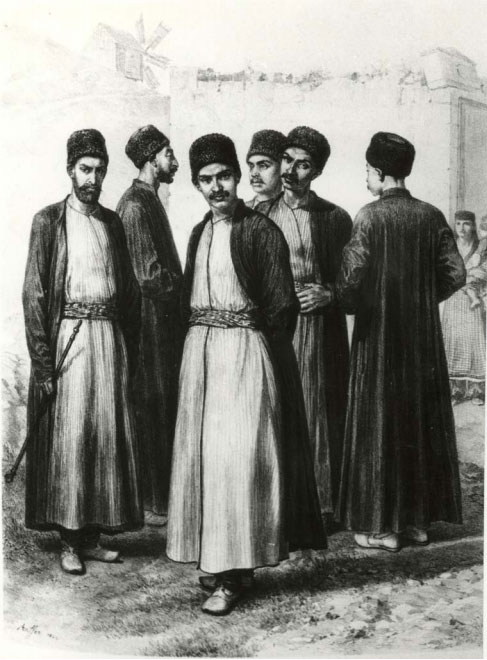
- Karaite men in traditional garb, Crimea, 19th century.

Total population
- 1,600+

Regions with significant populations
- Israel: ~500
- Ukraine (excluding Crimea): 481
- Crimea: 295
- Poland: 346
- Kazakhstan: 231
- Russia: 215
- Lithuania: 192

Languages
- Karaim, Crimean Tatar, Lithuanian, Polish, Russian

Religion
- Majority: Karaite Judaism; Minority: Sunni Islam and Eastern Orthodoxy

Related ethnic groups
- Crimean Tatars, Crimean Urums, Crimean Roma, Crimean Armenians; Other Jews, especially other Karaim (particularly Egyptian and Constantinopolitan Karaites), Krymchaks, Ashkenazim, Sephardim, Mizrahim

Crimean Karaites or simply Karaites (Crimean Karaim: Кърымкъарайлар, Qrımqaraylar, singular къарай, qaray; Trakai dialect: karajlar, singular karaj; Crimean Tatar: Qaraylar), also known more broadly as Eastern European Karaites, are a traditionally Turkic-speaking Judaic ethnoreligious group native to Crimea. Nowadays, most Karaim in Eastern Europe speak the dominant local language of their respective regions.

They have lived alongside Krymchaks. Most Karaites in the region do not consider themselves to be Jews, associating the ethnonym with Rabbinical Jews alone, but rather consider themselves to be descendants of the Khazars, non-Rabbinical Judeans, or other Turkic peoples.

Research into the origins of the Karaites indicates they are of ethnic Jewish origin and are genetically closely related to other Jewish diaspora groups. Some researchers believe they originated in Constantinople and later settled in the Byzantine Principality of Theodoro.

A closely related group, the Slavic Karaites, were formally accepted into the Karaite ethnoreligious community of Crimea after the deposition of Tsar Nicholas II in 1917. They are descendants of ethnic Russian Subbotniks. However, most Slavs claiming to be Karaites in Eastern Europe are not members of the Karaite ethnoreligious community, and are not accepted as legitimate Karaites.

== Origins ==
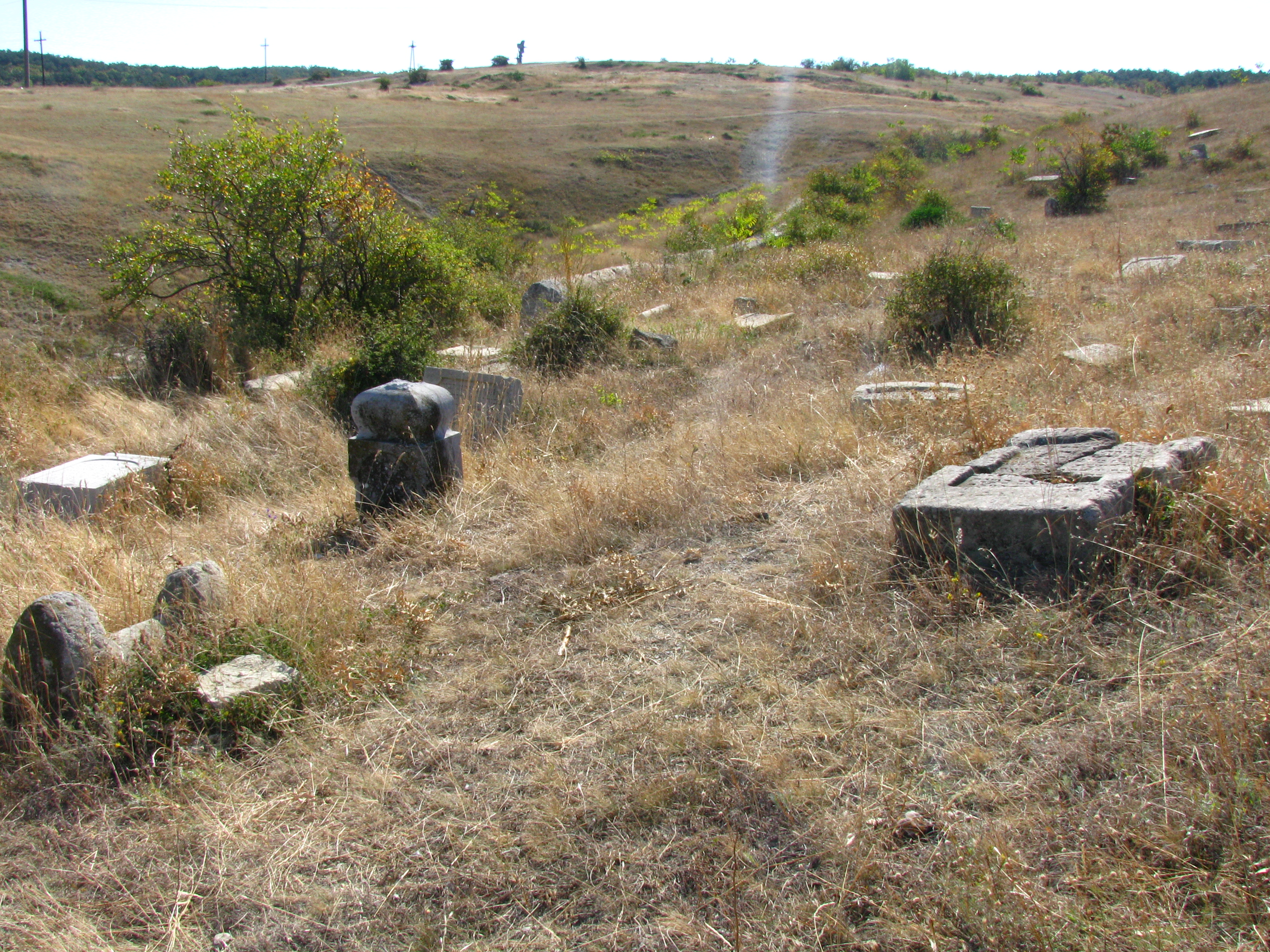
Cemetery near Feodosia (Crimea)

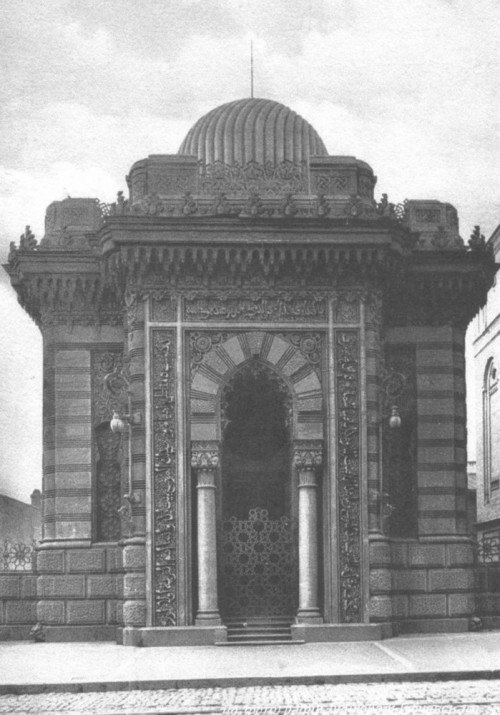
Former Karaim Kenesa in Kyiv

Turkic-speaking Karaite Jews (in the Crimean Tatar language, Qaraylar) have lived in Crimea for centuries. Most modern scientists regard them as descendants of Karaite Jews who settled in Crimea and adopted a Kypchak language. Others view them as descendants of Khazar or Cuman, Kipchak converts to Karaite Judaism. Today, many Crimean Karaites reject ethnic Semitic origins theories and identify as descendants of the Khazars. Some specialists in Khazar history question the Khazar theory of Karaim origins, noting the following:

- the Karaim language belongs to the Kipchak language subgroup of Turkic, and the Khazar language arguably belongs to the Oghuric group; there is no close relationship between these two Turkic languages;
- According to the Khazar Correspondence, Khazar Judaism was, most likely, Rabbinic Judaism. The tradition of Karaite Judaism ranks only the Tanakh as a holy book and does not recognize the Talmud;
- Khazars disappeared in the 11th century. But, the first written mention of the Crimean Karaites was in the 13th century;
- Anthropologic researches show similarity between Crimean Karaites of Lithuania and Egyptian Karaite Jews.

In 19th century Crimea, Karaites began to distinguish themselves from other Jewish groups, sending envoys to the czars to plead for exemptions from harsh anti-Jewish legislation. These entreaties were successful, in large part due to the tsars' wariness of the Talmud, and in 1863 Karaites were granted the same rights as their Christian and Tatar neighbors. Exempted from the Pale of Settlement, later they were considered non-Jews by Nazis. This left the community untouched by the Holocaust, unlike other Turkic-speaking Jews, like the Krymchak Jews that were almost wiped out.

Miller says that Crimean Karaites did not start claiming a distinct identity apart from the Jewish people before the 19th century, and that such leaders as Avraham Firkovich and Sima Babovich encouraged this position to avoid the strong antisemitism of the period.

From the time of the Golden Horde onward, Karaites were present in many towns and villages throughout Crimea and around the Black Sea. During the period of the Crimean Khanate, they had major communities in the towns of Çufut Qale, Sudak, Kefe, and Bakhchysarai.

== History ==
=== Grand Duchy of Lithuania and Polish–Lithuanian Commonwealth ===
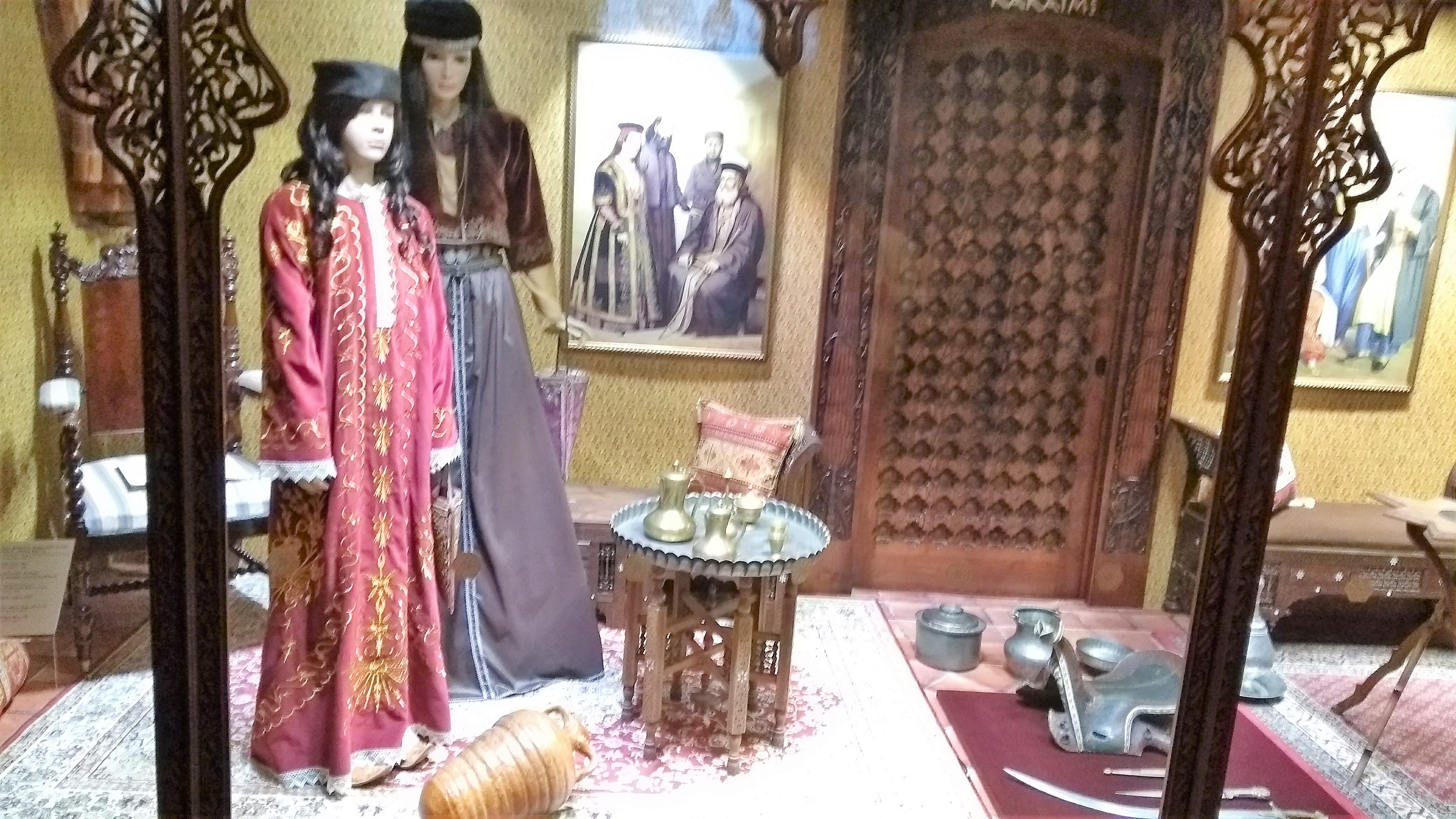
Showcase of the Crimean Karaites traditional lifestyle in Trakai, Lithuania

According to Karaite tradition, Grand Duke Vytautas of the Grand Duchy of Lithuania relocated one branch of the Crimean Karaites to Lithuania ordering to build them a town, called today Trakai. There they continued to speak their own language. This legend originally referring to 1218 as the date of relocation contradicts the fact that the Lithuanian dialect of the Karaim language differs significantly from the Crimean one. The Lithuanian Karaites settled primarily in Vilnius and Trakai, as well as in Biržai, Pasvalys, Naujamiestis and Upytė – smaller settlements throughout Lithuania proper.

The Lithuanian Karaites also settled in lands of modern Belarus and Ukraine, which were part of the Grand Duchy of Lithuania. The Karaite communities emerged in Halych and Kukeziv (near Lviv) in Galicia, as well as in Lutsk and Derazhne in Volhynia. Jews (Rabbinites and Karaites) in Lithuanian territory were granted a measure of autonomy under Michel Ezofovich Senior's management. The Trakai Karaim refused to comply, citing differences in faith. Later all Jews, including Karaites, were placed under the authority of the Rabbinite "Council of Four Lands" (Vaad) and "Council of the Land of Lithuania" taxation (1580–1646). The Yiddish-speaking Rabbinites considered the Turkic-speaking Karaites to be apostates, and kept them in a subordinate and depressed position. The Karaites resented this treatment. In 1646, the Karaites obtained the expulsion of the Rabbinites from Trakai. Despite such tensions, in 1680, Rabbinite community leaders defended the Karaites of Shaty near Trakai against an accusation of blood libel. Representatives of both groups signed an agreement in 1714 to respect the mutual privileges and resolve disputes without involving the Gentile administration.

According to Crimean Karaite tradition, which developed in the 20th century interwar Poland their forefathers were mainly farmers and members of the community who served in the military forces of the Grand Duchy of Lithuania and the Polish–Lithuanian Commonwealth, as well as in the Crimean Khanate. But according to the historical documents of the Grand Duchy of Lithuania, the chief occupation of the Crimean Karaites was money lending. They were granted special privileges, including exemption from the military service. In the Crimean Khanate, the Karaites were repressed like other Jews, with prohibitions on behavior extended to riding horses.

Some famous Karaim scholars in Lithuania included Isaac b. Abraham of Troki (1543–1598), Joseph ben Mordecai Malinovski, Zera ben Nathan of Trakai, Salomon ben Aharon of Trakai, Ezra ben Nissan (died in 1666) and Josiah ben Judah (died after 1658). Some of the Karaim became quite wealthy.

During the times of the Polish–Lithuanian Commonwealth, the Karaim suffered severely during the Khmelnytsky Uprising of 1648 and the wars between Russia and the Commonwealth in the years 1654–1667. The many towns plundered and burnt included Derazhne and Trakai, where only 30 families were left in 1680. The destruction of the Karaite community in Derazhne in 1649 is described in a poem (both in Hebrew and Karaim) by a leader of the congregation, Hazzan Joseph ben Yeshuah HaMashbir. Catholic missionaries worked to convert the local Karaim to Christianity, but were largely unsuccessful.

=== Russian Empire ===
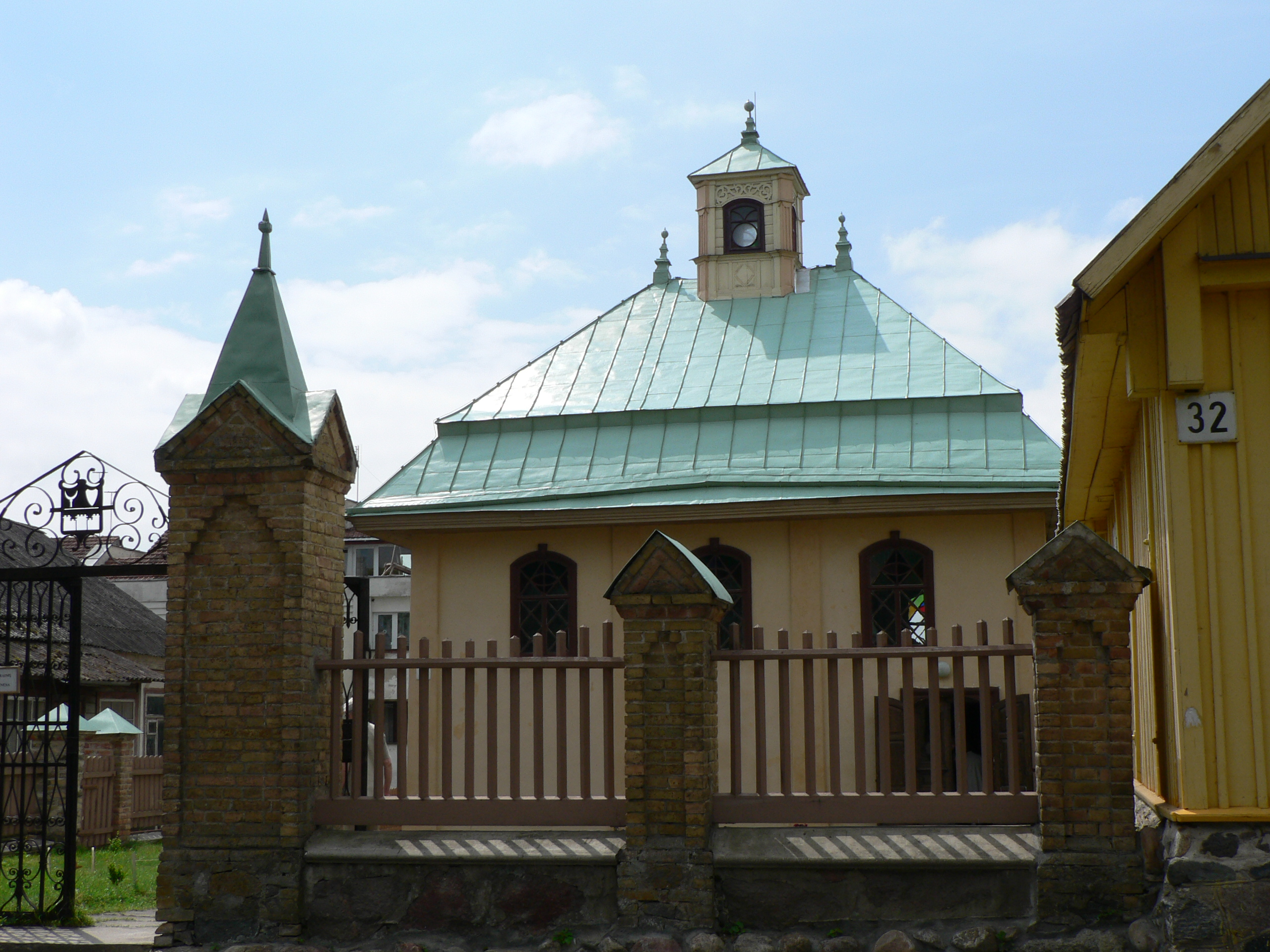
Karaim kenesa in Trakai (modern day Lithuania).

19th century leaders of the Karaim, such as Sima Babovich and Avraham Firkovich, were driving forces behind a concerted effort to alter the status of the Karaite community in eyes of the Russian legal system. Firkovich in particular was adamant in his attempts to connect the Karaim with the Khazars, and has been accused of forging documents and inscriptions to back up his claims.

Ultimately, the Tsarist government officially recognized the Karaim as being innocent of the death of Jesus. So they were exempt from many of the harsh restrictions placed on other Jews. They were, in essence, placed on equal legal footing with Crimean Tatars. The related Krymchak community, which was of similar ethnolinguistic background but which practiced rabbinical Judaism, continued to suffer under Tsarist anti-Jewish laws.

Solomon Krym (1864–1936), a Crimean Karaite agronomist, was elected in 1906 to the First Duma (1906–1907) as a Kadet (National Democratic Party). On November 16, 1918 he became the Prime Minister of a short-lived Crimean Russian liberal, anti-separatist and anti-Soviet government also supported by the German army.

Since the incorporation of Crimea into the Russian Empire the main center of the Qarays is the city of Yevpatoria. Their status under Russian imperial rule bore beneficial fruits for the Karaites decades later.

=== During the Holocaust ===
In 1934, the heads of the Karaite community in Berlin asked the Nazi authorities to exempt Karaites from the anti-Semitic regulations based on their legal status as Russians in Russia. The Reich Agency for the Investigation of Families determined that, from the standpoint of German law, the Karaites were not to be considered Jews. The letter from the Reichsstelle für Sippenforschung (de) officially ruled:

The Karaite sect should not be considered a Jewish religious community within the meaning of paragraph 2, point 2 of the First Regulation to the Reich Citizenship Law. However, it cannot be established that Karaites in their entirety are of blood-related stock, for the racial categorization of an individual cannot be determined without … his personal ancestry and racial biological characteristics

—

This ruling set the tone for how the Nazis dealt with the Karaite community in Eastern Europe. At the same time, the Nazis had serious reservations about the Karaites. SS Obergruppenfuhrer Gottlob Berger wrote on November 24, 1944:

"Their Mosaic religion is unwelcome. However, on grounds of race, language and religious dogma... Discrimination against the Karaites is unacceptable, in consideration of their racial kinsmen [Berger was here referring to the Crimean Tatars]. However, so as not to infringe the unified anti-Jewish orientation of the nations led by Germany, it is suggested that this small group be given the opportunity of a separate existence (for example, as a closed construction or labor battalion)..."

Despite having exempt status, groups of Karaites were massacred in the early phases of the war. German soldiers who came across Karaites in the Soviet Union during the invasion of Operation Barbarossa, unaware of their legal status under German law, attacked them; 200 were killed at Babi Yar alone. German allies such as Vichy France began to require the Karaites to register as Jews, but eventually granted them non-Jewish status after getting orders by Berlin.

When interrogated, Ashkenazi rabbis in Crimea told the Germans that Karaites were not Jews, in an effort to spare the Karaite community the fate of their Rabbanite neighbors. Many Karaites risked their lives to hide Jews, and in some cases claimed that Jews were members of their community. The Nazis impressed many Karaites into labor battalions.

According to some sources, Nazi racial theory asserted that the Karaites of Crimea were actually Crimean Goths who had adopted the Crimean Tatar language and their own distinct form of Judaism.

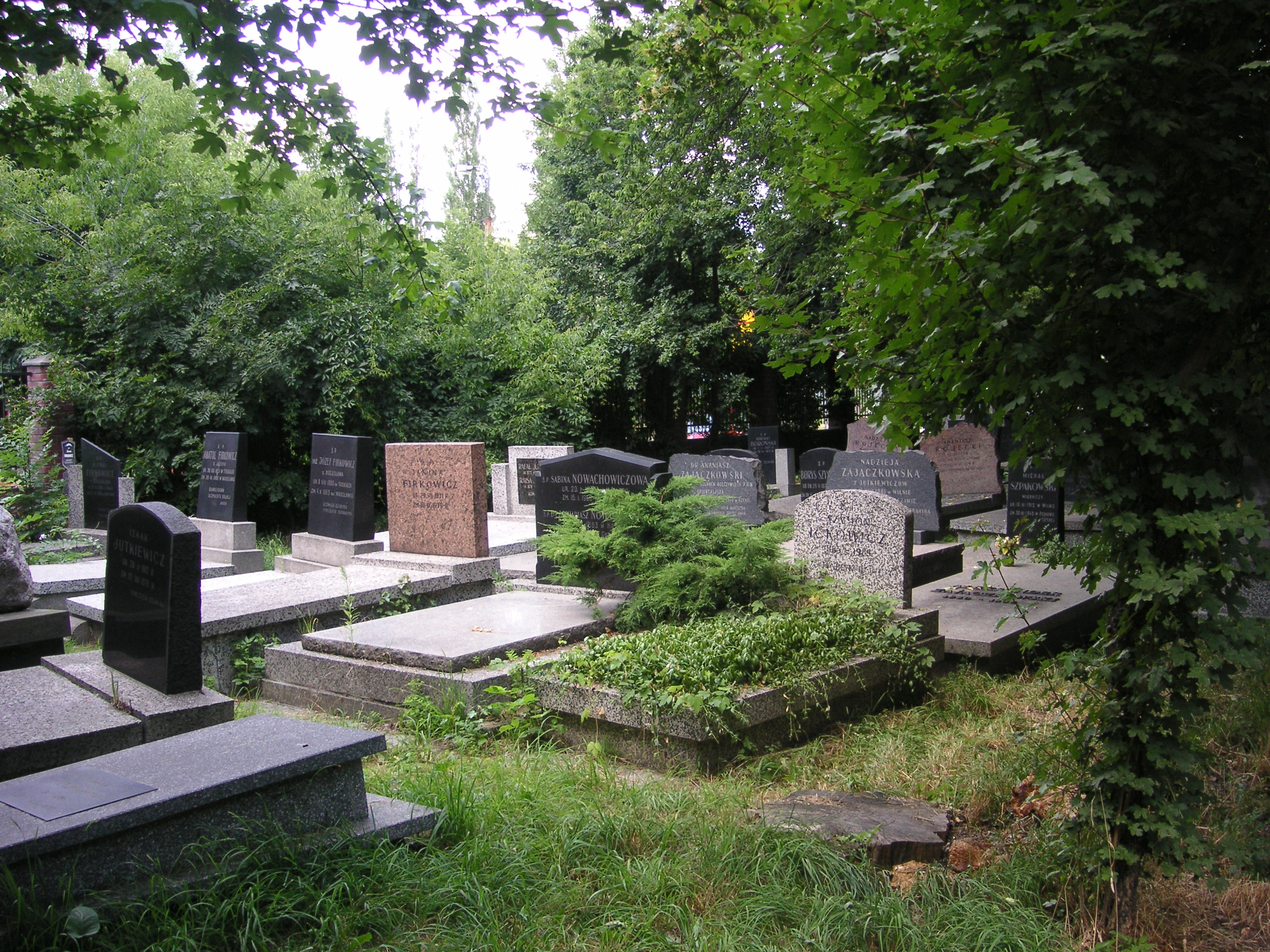
Karaim cemetery in Warsaw, established in 1890.

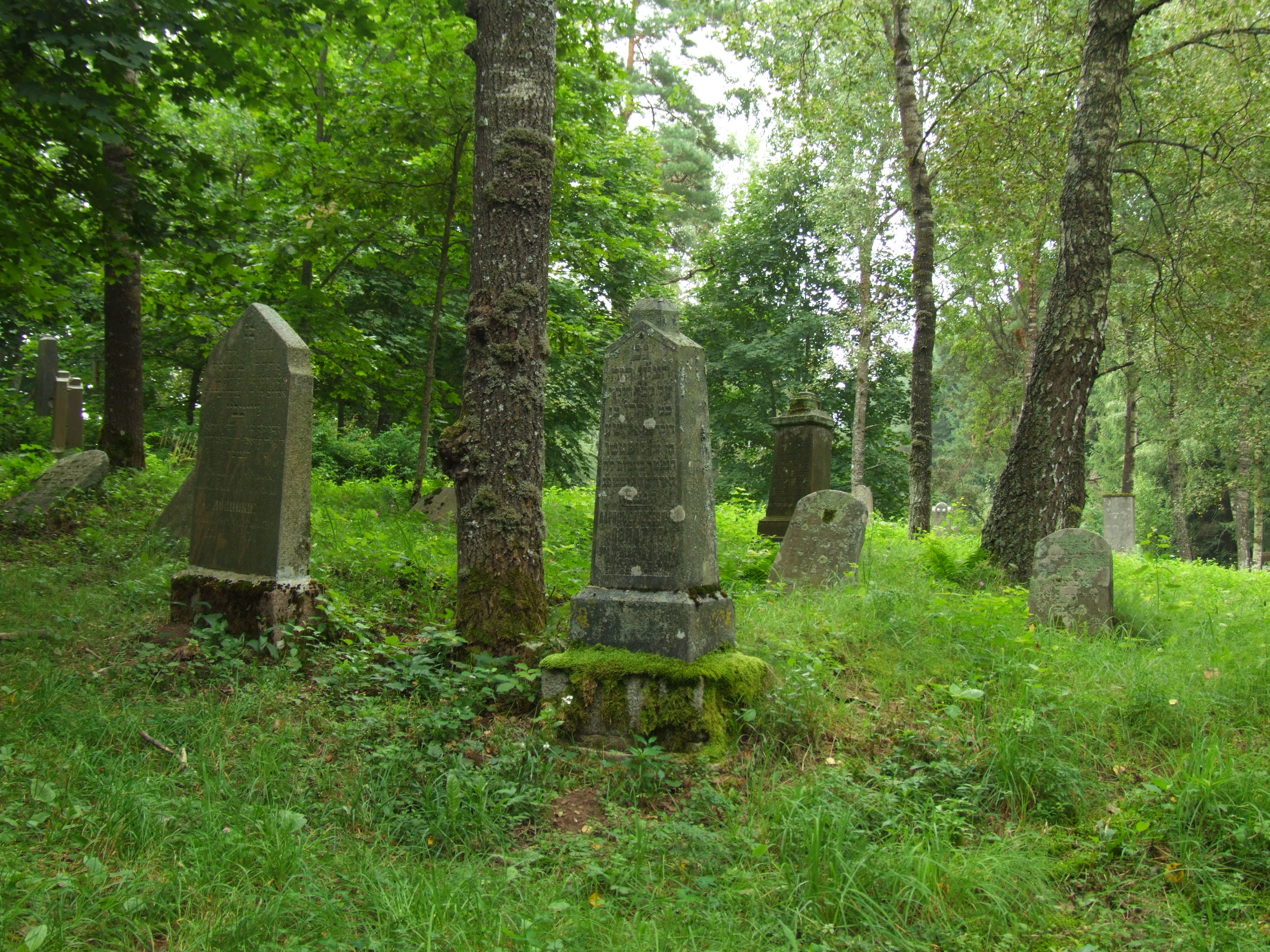
Karaim cemetery in Trakai.

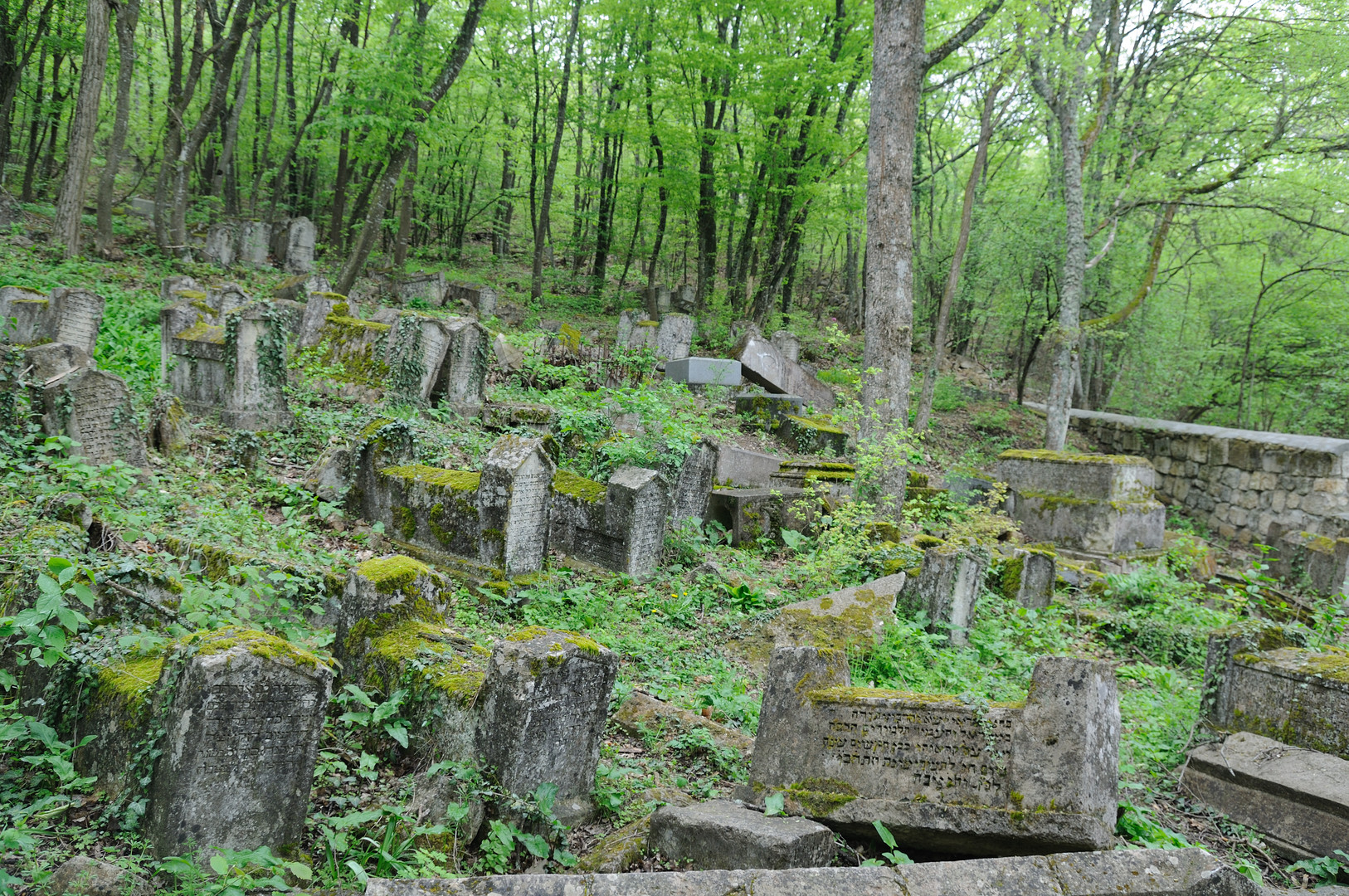
Karaim cemetery in Bakhchysarai, Crimea.

In Vilnius and Trakai, the Nazis forced Karaite Hakham Seraya Shapshal to produce a list of the members of the community. Though he did his best, not every Karaite was saved by Shapshal's list.

=== Post-WWII ===
After the Soviet recapture of Crimea from Nazi forces in 1944, the Soviet authorities counted 6,357 remaining Karaites. Karaites were not subject to mass deportation, unlike the Crimean Tatars, Greeks, Armenians and others the Soviet authorities alleged had collaborated during the Nazi German occupation. Some individual Karaites were deported.

Assimilation and emigration greatly reduced the ranks of the Karaite community. A few thousand Karaites remain in Lithuania, Belarus, Ukraine, Poland and Russia. Nowadays, the largest communities exist in Israel and the United States; however, these communities are almost entirely Egyptian in origin and ethnically and liturgically distinct from Crimean Karaites. There is also a community of fewer than 100 Karaites in Turkey.

In the 1990s, about 500 Crimean Karaites, mainly from Ukraine, emigrated to Israel under the Law of Return. The Israeli Chief Rabbinate has ruled that Karaites are Jews under Jewish law.

== Geographic distribution ==
Traditionally, Crimean Karaites had three major subdivisions, each of which maintained their own dialect of the Karaim dialect: the Crimean Karaites, the Galician Karaites, and the Lithuanian Karaites. Today, the distribution is different. The largest number is probably now in Israel; some other Crimean Karaites have left to America or elsewhere. These Karaites are mostly joining non-Crimean-Karaite communities.

According to Karaite tradition, all the Eastern European Karaite communities were derived from those in the Crimea, but some modern historians doubt the Crimean origin of Lithuanian Karaites. Nevertheless, the name "Crimean Karaites" is used for the Turkic-speaking Karaites community supposed to have originated in Crimea, distinguishing it from the historically Aramaic, Hebrew, and Arabic-speaking Karaites of the Middle East.

=== Kazakhstan ===
In 2009, 231 people in Kazakhstan identified as Karaites. This was an unusual jump from the 28 Karaites recorded in 1999.

=== Lithuania ===
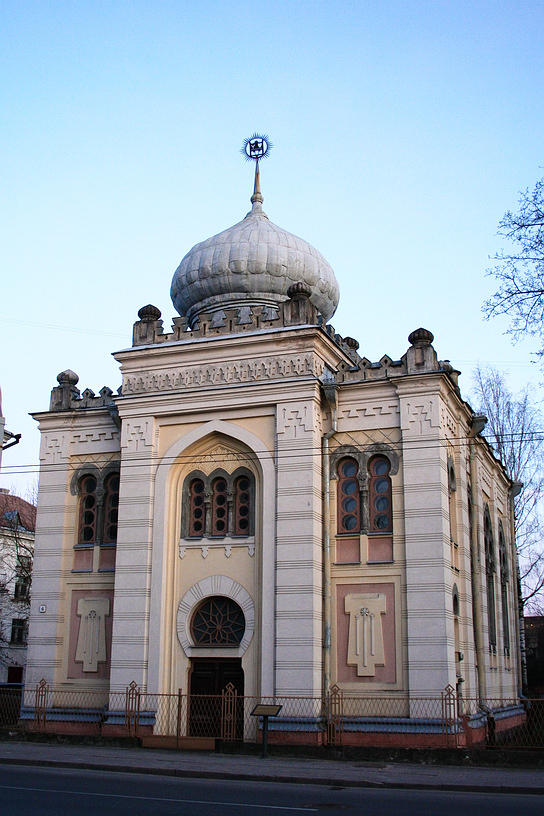
Kenesa in Vilnius

Karaite communities still exist in Lithuania, but have experienced a steep decline in numbers in recent decades. Historically, they lived mostly in Panevėžys and Trakai, but now most live in Vilnius, where they have a kenesa. There is also a kenesa in Trakai; the Panevėžys community has declined to only a handful of people and does not maintain a house of worship.

Within living memory, the community was many times larger than it is today. The 1979 census in the USSR showed 3,300 Karaim. Lithuanian Karaim Culture Community was founded in 1988. According to the Lithuanian Karaim website the Statistics Department of Lithuania carried out an ethno-statistic research entitled "Karaim in Lithuania" in 1997. It was decided to question all adult Karaim and mixed families, where one of the members is a Karaim. During the survey, for the beginning of 1997, there were 257 people of Karaim ethnicity, 32 of whom were children under 16. A similar survey was done in 2021, in honour of the 625th anniversary of Karaite settlement in Lithuania. This coincided with the 2021 national census.

In 2011, 423 individuals identified as Karaims in the Lithuanian census. By 2021, this had dropped to 192, a decline of around 55 percent in a single decade.

=== Poland ===
In 2011, 346 people in Poland identified as Karaites.

=== Russia ===
Outside Russian-occupied Crimea (see Ukraine, below), there are 205 self-identifying Karaites as of 2021, nearly all of whom speak Russian as a first language. There are no significant concentrations; the largest community numbers over 60 people in Moscow.

=== Ukraine ===
Crimea was traditionally the centre of the Crimean Karaite population. In the Ukrainian census of 2010, just under 60 percent of Ukraine's Karaite population, 715 individuals, lived in Crimea, representing around 30 percent of the global population at the time. However, between the Russian invasion of 2014 and the Russian census of 2021, the population dropped to 295, a fall of almost 60 percent. The war of 2022 may have caused further disruption. This means that the Crimean population is no longer the largest, and is almost certainly smaller than the populations of mainland Ukraine, Poland, and Israel.

Outside Crimea, Karaites historically settled in Galicia, particularly in Halych and Lutsk. However, there is only one Karaite left in Halych today, and the kenesa was shut down in 1959 and eventually demolished. The Galician community had its own dialect of Karaim. The largest contemporary Karaite community is in Kyiv; smaller ones exist in other cities, including Kharkiv, which has a functioning kenesa, although the community numbers only about two dozen. In the 2010 census, 481 Ukrainians identified as Karaites outside of Crimea. In 2021, the Ukrainian government unveiled a bill planned to grant Crimean Karaites and other minority groups official 'Indigenous' status.

== Religion ==
Until the 20th century, Karaite Judaism was the only religion of the Karaim. During the Russian Civil War a significant number of Karaim emigrated to Yugoslavia, Czechoslovakia, Poland and Hungary and then France and Germany. Most of them converted to Christianity. The Karaim's modern national movement philanthropist M.S. Sarach was one of them.

The Crimean Karaites' emancipation in the Russian Empire caused cultural assimilation followed by secularization. This process continued in the USSR when most of the kenesas were closed.

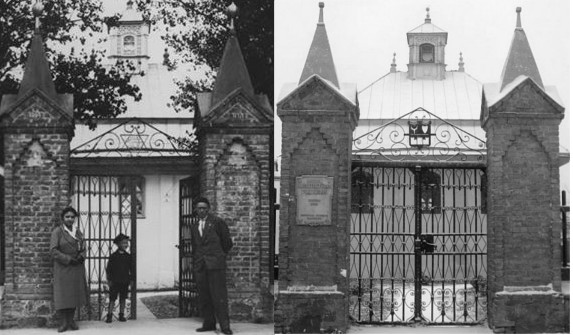
In 1932 Star of David was removed from the Trakai Kenesa cupola by Shapshal's' order. Some years later it was also removed from the iron gate.

In 1928 secular Karaim philologist Seraya Shapshal was elected as Hacham of Polish and Lithuanian Karaim. Being a strong adopter of Russian orientalist V. Grigorjev's theory about the Khazarian origin of the Crimean Karaites, Shapshal developed the Karaim's religion and "historical dejudaization" doctrine.

In the mid 1930s, he began to create a theory describing the Altai-Turkic origin of the Karaim and the pagan roots of Karaite religious teaching (worship of sacred oaks, polytheism, led by the god Tengri, the Sacrifice). Shapshal's doctrine is still a topic of critical research and public debate.

He made a number of other changes aimed at the Karaim's Turkification and at erasing the Karaite Jewish elements of their culture and language. He issued an order canceling the teaching of Hebrew in Karaite schools and replaced the names of the Jewish holidays and months with Turkic equivalents (see the table below).

According to Shapshal, Crimean Karaites were pagans who adopted the law of Moses, but continued to adhere to their ancient Turkic beliefs. In addition, he claimed that the Karaites had revered Jesus and Mohammed as prophets for centuries. In the Post-Soviet period, Shapshal's theory was further developed in modern Karaylar publications (e.g. "Crimean Karaite legends") and was officially adopted by the Crimean Karaim Association "Krymkaraylar" (Ассоциация крымских караимов "Крымкарайлар") as the only correct view of the Karaim's past in 2000.

The ideology of de-Judaization, pan-Turkism and the revival of Tengrism is imbued with the works of the contemporary leaders of the Karaites in Crimea. At the same time, some part of the people retained Jewish customs, several Karaite congregations have registered.

=== Evolution of Crimean Karaite holiday names in the 20th century ===
Traditional Hebrew name (1915)	Secondary name	Modern Turkic name	Turkic name translated to English.
Pesach	Hag ha-Machot (Unleavened bread festival)	Tymbyl Chydžy	Unleavened bread ("Tymbyl") festival
Omer	Sefira (Counting of the Omer)		
		San Bašy	Counting Beginning
		Jarty San	Counting Middle
Shavuot	Hag Shavuot (Feast of Weeks)	Aftalar Chydžy	Feast of Weeks
The 9th of Tammuz Fast	Chom Hareviyi (4th month fast)	Burunhu Oruč	First Fast
The 7th of Av Fast	Chom Hahamishi (5th month fast)	Ortančy Oruč	Middle Fast
The 10th of Av Fast	Nedava (sacrifice)	Kurban	Sacrifice
Rosh HaShana	Yom Teru'ah (The blowing of horns day)	Byrhy Kiuniu	Horns Day
Yom Kippur	literally "The Day of Atonement"	Bošatlych Kiuniu	The Day of Atonement
Fast of Gedalia	Chom Hashviyi (7th month fast)	Omitted	
Sukkot	literally "Tabernacles". The other name: "Hag Ha Asif" ("Harvest festival")	Alačych Chydžy or Oraq Toyu	Tabernacles festival or Harvest festival
Tenth of Tevet fast	Chom Haasiri (10th month fast)	Oruč	Fast
Purim	"Lots".	Kynyš	Three-cornered shaped sweet filled-pocket cookie.
	Was not considered a holiday	Jyl Bašy	The beginning of the Year

== Genetics ==
Leon Kull and Kevin Alan Brook led the first scientific study of Crimean Karaites using genetic testing of both Y chromosomal and mitochondrial DNA and their results showed that the Crimean Karaites are indeed partially of Middle Eastern origin and closely related to other Jewish communities (Ashkenazi, Sephardi and Mizrahi Jews and Egyptian Karaite Jews), while finding that the Crimean Karaites possess a lower affinity to non-Jewish Turkic-speaking peoples of the region.

Haplogroups G2a-P15, J1-M267, J2-M172 together make up more than half of the Karaites' gene pool. Next come haplogroups R1a-M198, C3, E1b, T and L.

== Culture ==
=== Language ===
Karaim belongs to Kipchak sub-branch of the Turkic family and is closely related to Crimean Tatar, Armeno-Kipchak etc. Among the many different influences exerted on Karaim, those of Arabic, Hebrew, and Persian were the first to change the outlook of the Karaim lexicon. Later, due to considerable Polish, Russian, and Ukrainian influence, many Slavic and Baltic words entered the language of Polish, Lithuanian, Ukrainian, and Russian Karaim. Hebrew remained in use for liturgical purposes. Following the Ottoman occupation of Crimea, Turkish was used for business and government purposes among Karaim living on the Crimean peninsula. Three different dialects developed: the Trakai dialect, used in Trakai and Vilnius (Lithuania), the Lutsk or Halych dialect spoken in Lutsk (until World War II), and Halych, and the Crimean dialect. The last forms the Eastern group, while Trakai and Halych Karaim belong to the Western group. Currently only small minority of Karaim can speak the Karaim language (72 Crimean dialect speakers, 118 Trakai dialect speakers, and about 20 Halych dialect speakers).

=== Cuisine ===
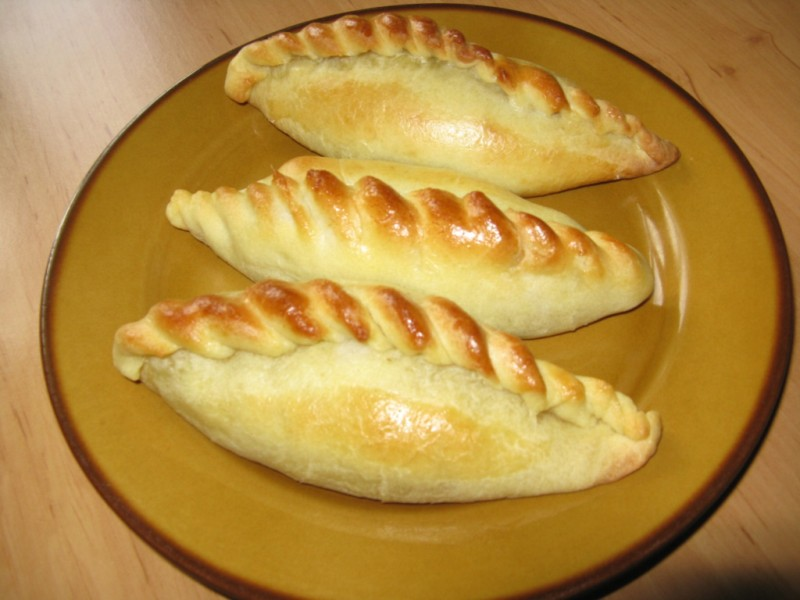
Kybyn

The most famous Crimean Karaite food is Kybyn (Russian: Кибина pl. Кибины, Karaim: kybyn pl. kybynlar, Lithuanian: Kibinai). Kybynlar are half moon shaped pies of leavened dough with a stuffing of chopped beef or mutton, baked in dutch oven or baking sheet. Other meals common for Crimean Karaites and Tatars are Chiburekki, Pelmeni, Shishlik (These are most often made from mutton).

Ceremony dishes, cooked for religious holidays and weddings are:

- Tymbyl is Pesach round cakes flat of unleavened dough, knead with cream and butter or butter and eggs, reflected in the modern name of this festival (Tymbyl Chydžy),
- Qatlama is Shavuot (Aftalar Chydžy) cottage cheese pie, which seven layers symbolizing seven weeks after Pesach, four layers of yeast dough, three of pot cheese,
- Wedding pies are Kiyovliuk (on the part of the groom) and Kelin'lik (on the part of the bride).

== Notable Crimean Karaites ==
- Benjamin Aga (died 1824), treasurer of Crimean Khan Şahin Giray and leader of the Crimean Karaites
- Sima Babovich (1790–1855), hakham of the Russian Crimean Karaites (1839–1855)
- Aaron ben Joseph of Constantinople (c. 1260–c. 1320), philosopher, physician, and liturgical poet in the Byzantine Empire
- Abraham Firkovich (1786–1874), writer and archaeologist, collector of ancient manuscripts, and a Karaite Hakham
- Iosif Grigulevich (1913–1988), Soviet secret police (NKVD) operative
- Adolph Joffe (1883–1927), Russian revolutionary, Bolshevik politician and Soviet diplomat
- Abraham Kirimi (c. 1300s), rabbi
- Solomon Krym (1864–1936), politician, statesman and agronomist
- Marina Kumysh (born 1964), Soviet former competitive volleyball player and Olympic gold medalist
- Yehudi Menuhin (1916–1999), American-born British violinist and conductor
- Mordecai ben Nissan (c. 1700s), rabbinical and in Karaite literature scholar
- Seraya Shapshal (1873–1961), hakham and leader of the Crimean, Polish and Lithuanian Crimean Karaites

== See also ==
- Crimean Tatars
- Karaite Jews
- Kenesa
- Khazars
- Krymchaks
- Samaritans
- Subbotniks
- Turkish Jews

== Bibliography ==
- Ben-Tzvi, Yitzhak. The Exiled and the Redeemed. Philadelphia: Jewish Publication Society, 1957.
- Blady, Ken. Jewish Communities in Exotic Places. Northvale, N.J.: Jason Aronson Inc., 2000. pp. 115–130.
- Brook, Kevin Alan. The Jews of Khazaria. 2nd ed. Rowman & Littlefield Publishers, Inc, 2006.
- Friedman, Philip. "The Karaites under Nazi Rule". On the Tracks of Tyranny. London, 1960.
- Green, W.P. "Nazi Racial Policy Towards the Karaites", Soviet Jewish Affairs 8,2 (1978) pp. 36–44
- Golden, Peter B. (2007a). "Khazar Studies: Achievements and Perspectives". In Golden, Peter B.; Ben-Shammai, Haggai; Róna-Tas, András (eds.). The World of the Khazars: New Perspectives. Handbook of Oriental Studies. Vol. 17. BRILL. pp. 7–57. ISBN 978-9-004-16042-2.
- Karaite Judaism: Introduction to Karaite Studies. Edited by M. Polliack. Leiden: Brill Publishers, 2004, 657–708.
- Kizilov, Mikhail. Karaites Through the Travelers' Eyes: Ethnic History, Traditional Culture and Everyday Life of the Crimean Karaites According to the Descriptions of the Travelers. Qirqisani Center, 2003.
- Kizilov, Mikhail. "Faithful Unto Death: Language, Tradition, and the Disappearance of the East European Karaite Communities". East European Jewish Affairs 36:1 (2006): 73–93.
- Krymskiye karaimy: istoricheskaya territoriya: etnokul'tura. Edited by V.S. Kropotov, V.Yu. Ormeli, A. Yu. Polkanova. Simferpol': Dolya, 200
- Kizilov, Mikhail. Sons of Scripture: The Karaites in Poland and Lithuania in the Twentieth Century. De Gruyter, 2015.
- Miller, Philip. Karaite Separatism in 19th Century Russia. HUC Press, 1993.
- Semi, Emanuela T. "The Image of the Karaites in Nazi and Vichy France Documents". Jewish Journal of Sociology 33:2 (December 1990). pp. 81–94.
- Shapira, Dan. "Remarks on Avraham Firkowicz and the Hebrew Mejelis 'Document'". Acta Orientalia Academiae Scientiarum Hungaricae 59:2 (2006): 131–180.
- Shapira, Dan. "A Jewish Pan-Turkist: Seraya Szapszał (Şapşaloğlu) and His Work 'Qırım Qaray Türkleri'". Acta Orientalia Academiae Scientiarum Hungaricae 58:4 (2005): 349–380.
- Shapira, Dan. Avraham Firkowicz in Istanbul (1830–1832). Paving the Way for Turkic Nationalism. Ankara: KaraM, 2003.
- Shapshal, S. M.: Karaimy SSSR v otnoshenii etnicheskom: karaimy na sluzhbe u krymskich chanov. Simferopol', 2004
- Wixman, Ronald. "The Peoples of the USSR: An Ethnographic Handbook". Routledge, 1984.
- Zajączkowski, Ananiasz. Karaims in Poland: History, Language, Folklore, Science. Panistwowe Wydawn, 1961.
