= Sima Babovich =

Crimean Karaite hakham (1790–1855)

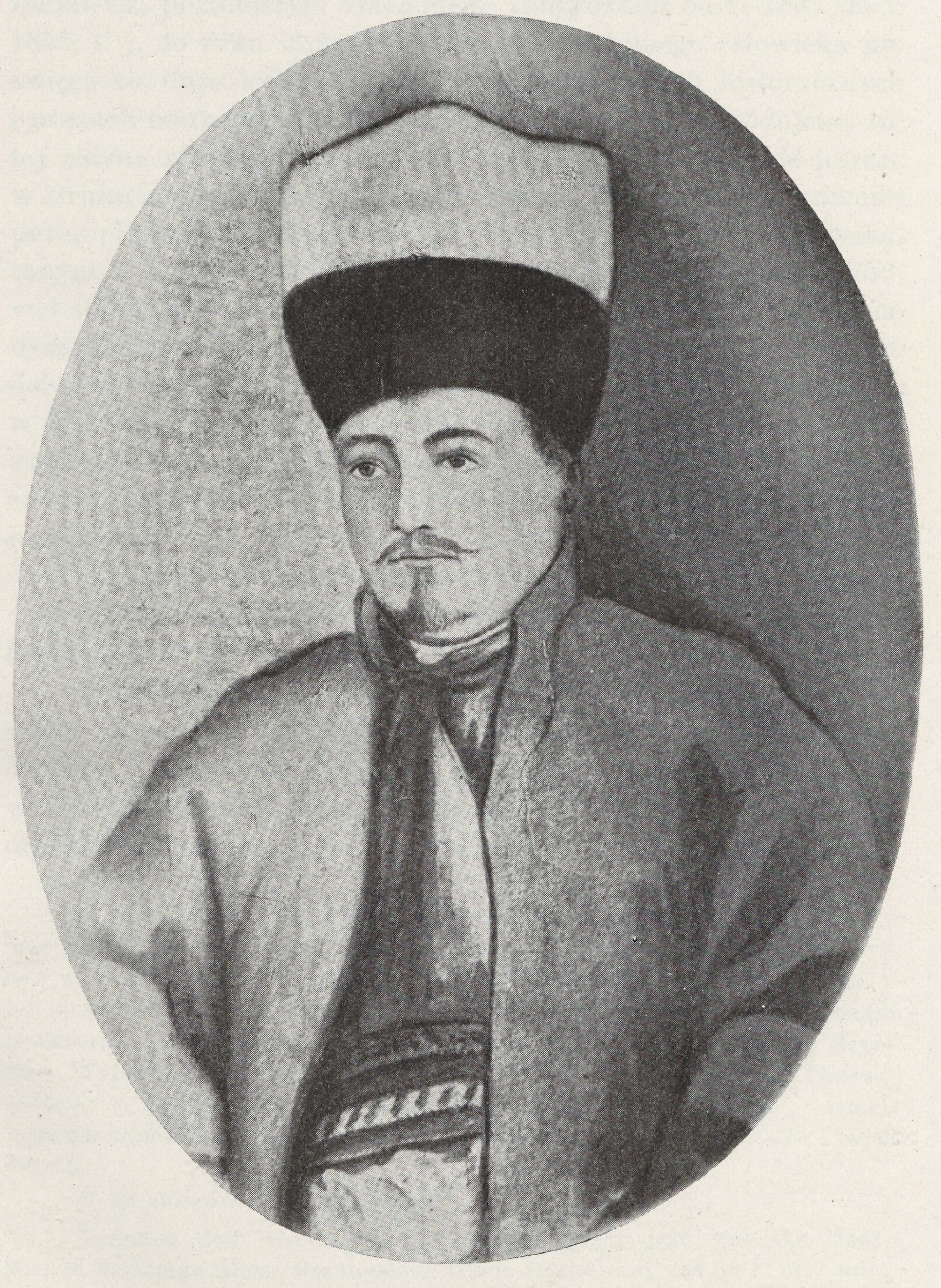
Sima Babovich

Sima ben Salomon Babovich (Karaim: Сима Бабович - Sima Babovich, Russian: Сима Соломонович Бабович; 1790–1855) was the first Hakham of the Russian Crimean Karaites (1839–1855), one of the early figures in the Crimean Karaites movement.

Babovich used his influence with Czarist authorities to obtain an exemption for the Crimean Karaites of Russia from military service, which continued to be compulsory for Rabbinic Jews in Russia. The Karaites of Yevpatoria commemorated this event every year by an annual special prayer in his honor.

Babovich and his descendants were prominent leaders in the affairs of the Crimean Karaites. His agitation gained recognition from the Russian government of the Karaites as a separate religious community in 1837. He was a close associate of Avraham Firkovich, who accompanied him on his visit to the Holy Land in 1830. It was Babovich who asked Firkovich to assemble material detailing the history, origin and customs of the Crimean Karaites, in response to a request from the Russian government. In 1840 the Karaites were granted the status of an independent Church and giving them rights far in advance of the Jews. The Russian government made Babovich the Hakham of the Crimean Karaites.

== See also ==
- History of the Jews in Russia and the Soviet Union
