= Benjamin Aga =

Leader of the Crimean Karaites

Benjamin Aga (Karaim: Беньямин Агъа; died 1824) was the leader of the Crimean Karaites. He was the royal treasurer of Şahin Giray, the last Crimean Khan, and therefore is called in Karaite literature ha-Neeman ("the Trusted")—an appellation bestowed also upon his father Samuel, who died in 1770, and who probably held the same office under former khans. When Şahin Giray fled for his life from his rebellious subjects, and sought succor from his protectress Catherine II in St. Petersburg, Benjamin Aga followed him, hoping to collect the large sums of money that he had advanced to the fugitive. Following the last partition of Poland in 1795, after Crimea had been under Russian rule for over a decade, Vilnius, Lutsk and Trakai came under Russian Rule. Benjamin Aga, Solomon ben Nahamu Bobowitz, and the astronomer Isaac of Kalea, the son-in-law of Jacob Aga, who was the elder brother of Benjamin, went to St. Petersburg as a delegation from the Crimean Karaites, to petition the empress to release their sect from the double rate of taxation which all the Jews then had to pay. Through the intervention of Count Nikolay Zubov, the delegation obtained from the empress the exemption from the "Jewish" taxes, some land grants, and other privileges which had not been asked for. This established an important precedent for exempting the Karaites from subsequent anti-Jewish legislation. The extraordinary success of the mission served to arouse great enthusiasm among the Karaites, and Aga and his fellow delegates were received with great honor on their return. A large monolith, fashioned out of marble, with fitting inscription, was erected in the court of the kenesa at Eupatoria, to commemorate an event so important in the history of the Karaites of Russia.

== Bibliography ==
- Isaac of Kalea, Or ha-Lebanah, Zhytomir, 1882.
