= Seraya Shapshal =

Crimean Karaite community leader (1873-1961)

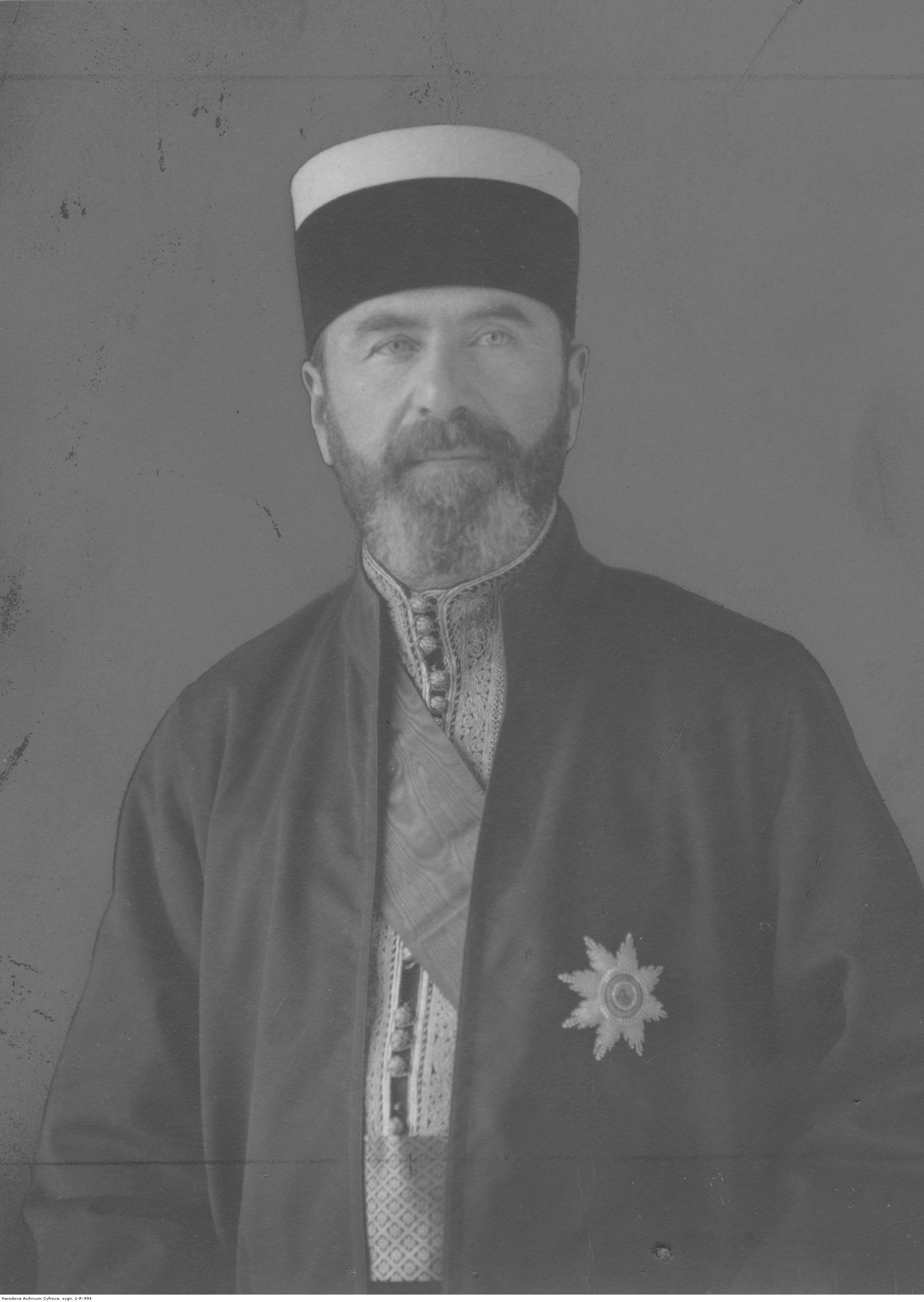
Seraya Shapshal, c. 1930s

Seraya Shapshal or His Excellency Hajji Seraya Khan Shapshal (Karaim: Серая Бен Мордехай Шапшал; Lithuanian: Seraja Šapšalas; Polish: Seraj Szapszał; Russian: Серге́й Маркович Шапшал) (1873–1961) was a hakham and leader of the Crimean and then the Polish and Lithuanian Crimean Karaites (Karaim) community.

== Biography ==
Shapshal was born in Bahçesaray, Crimea and studied at St. Petersburg University, where he was graduated in philology and oriental languages. During his studies he became a strong adopter of Russian orientalist V. Grigorjev's theory about the Khazarian origin of the Crimean Karaites. Immediately after his graduation at 1901 he was invited to serve as the personal tutor of the Iranian crown prince, Mohammad Ali Shah Qajar, and became a minister in the Persian government in 1907. In 1911 he returned to Crimea and became Chief Hakham of the Crimean Karaites communities in Crimea.

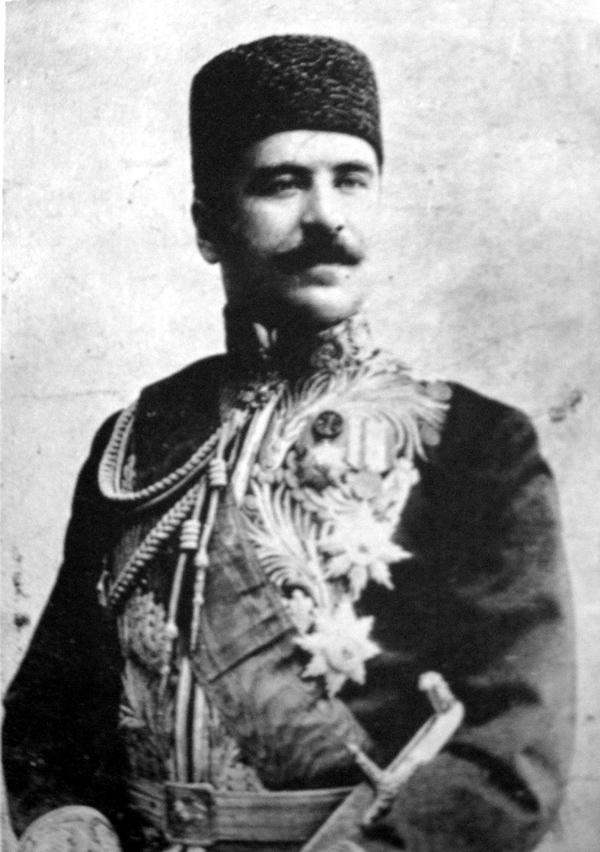
Seraya Shapshal, 1895

From 1920 to 1927 he lived in Istanbul. Here he was active in the pan-Turkic movement. In 1927 while living in Turkey he was elected the head of the Karaims in Poland and in 1928 moved to Wilno.

He denied any connection between Crimean Karaites and Rabbinic Jews. Shapshal is the founder of the Crimean Karaite religion and historical doctrine of Dejudaization. Under this doctrine, he changed the traditional title of "Hacham" to "Gahan" ("Ḥakhan"), which in his opinion goes back to the Khazarian word "Khagan". In the mid 1930s, he began to create a theory of the Altai-Turkic origin of the Karaims and the pagan roots of the Karaite religious teaching (worship of sacred oaks, polytheism, led by the god Tengri, the Sacrifice). Shapshal's doctrine is still a topic of critical research and public debate.

He made a number of reforms aimed at the Turkification of the Karaims and the eradication of Jewish elements from their culture and language. He issued an order abolishing the teaching of Hebrew in Karaite schools, replaced names of Jewish holidays and months with the Turkic ones, renamed "Gahan" the position of "Hacham" in consonance with the word "khan". According to Shapshal, the doctrine of Anan ben David was close to early Christianity, and Karaites had believed for centuries in Jesus and Mohammed as prophets. Crimean Karaites adopted the law of Moses, but continued to adhere to the ancient Turkic pagan beliefs.

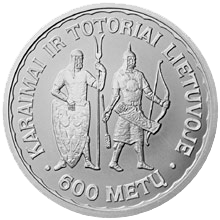
Karaim and Tatar warriors on a commemorative Lithuanian coin. The idea of Karaim warriors was introduced by Shapshal and his followers.

Between the efforts to impose a Khazarian origin for the Crimean Karaites was the "militarization" process of their history originated in the 20th century's inter-war Poland: the trend of representing the Karaite population of Eastern Europe as a nation of warriors. Shapshal was one of the initiators of this process.

In 1939, using his connections with the community of Russian emigrés in Germany, he appealed to the authorities of the Ministry of Internal Affairs of the Reich with a request to examine the issue of Crimean Karaites' ethnicity. After the occupation by German troops of the areas of Eastern Europe populated by Crimean Karaites, this appellation was observed by the German administration. They involved three major historian specialists on the history of the Karaites: Zelig Kalmanovich, Meir Balaban and Yitzhak (Ignacy) Schiper. Despite the fact that all three had been before the war fierce opponents of the theory of the Turkic origin of the Crimean Karaites, they supported Shapshal's theory in order to save the European Karaites from the Holocaust. Shapshal was instrumental in the formulation of Nazi policy towards the Karaims. As Hakham of Vilnius he was infamous for his confrontations with such Jewish community figures as Zelig Kalmanovich. He was also known for having been forced (under penalty of endangering his own community) to give the Nazis a detailed list of the members of the Crimean Karaites communities of Troki and Vilnius, allowing them to easily discover and arrest Jews who had forged papers stating that they were Crimean Karaites.

In 1945 he formally abdicated from Karaite Gahan post, submitting a statement to the Commissioner for Religious Affairs of the Council of Ministers of the Lithuanian SSR, and got a position as a researcher at the Institute of History of the Soviet-dominated Lithuanian Academy of Sciences

He co-authored a Karaim–Russian–Polish dictionary (published in 1974) and wrote a number of articles on the Crimean Karaites.

Using his position he continued to promote his ideas, including forgery of some evidences regarding the military past of Crimean Karaites, publishing the articles about his "discoveries" in the Soviet Union's leading academic journals. Recent studies on Shapshal's archive have shown that his drafts include several versions of the "original" documents texts, evidencing forgery. In spite of that, Shapshal's ideas about Karaim warriors were adopted widely in USSR and even abroad. Thus in Trakai, modern Lithuania, visitors are often told that Karaim warriors were guards of Trakai Castles. In 1997, a commemorative coin in denominations of 50 LTL was issued in honor of the 600th anniversary of the Tatars and Crimean Karaites in Lithuania. The coin includes the image of Tatar and Karaim warriors.

Some of his works (including "History of the Karaims") remain unpublished. Part of his collections and books are kept in National Library of Lithuania, the other in a small museum in the old kenesa of Trakai, where he died in 1961.

Some of his descendants settled in Israel during the 1990s under the Law of Return.
