= Derazhne =

Derazhne Деражне
- Village
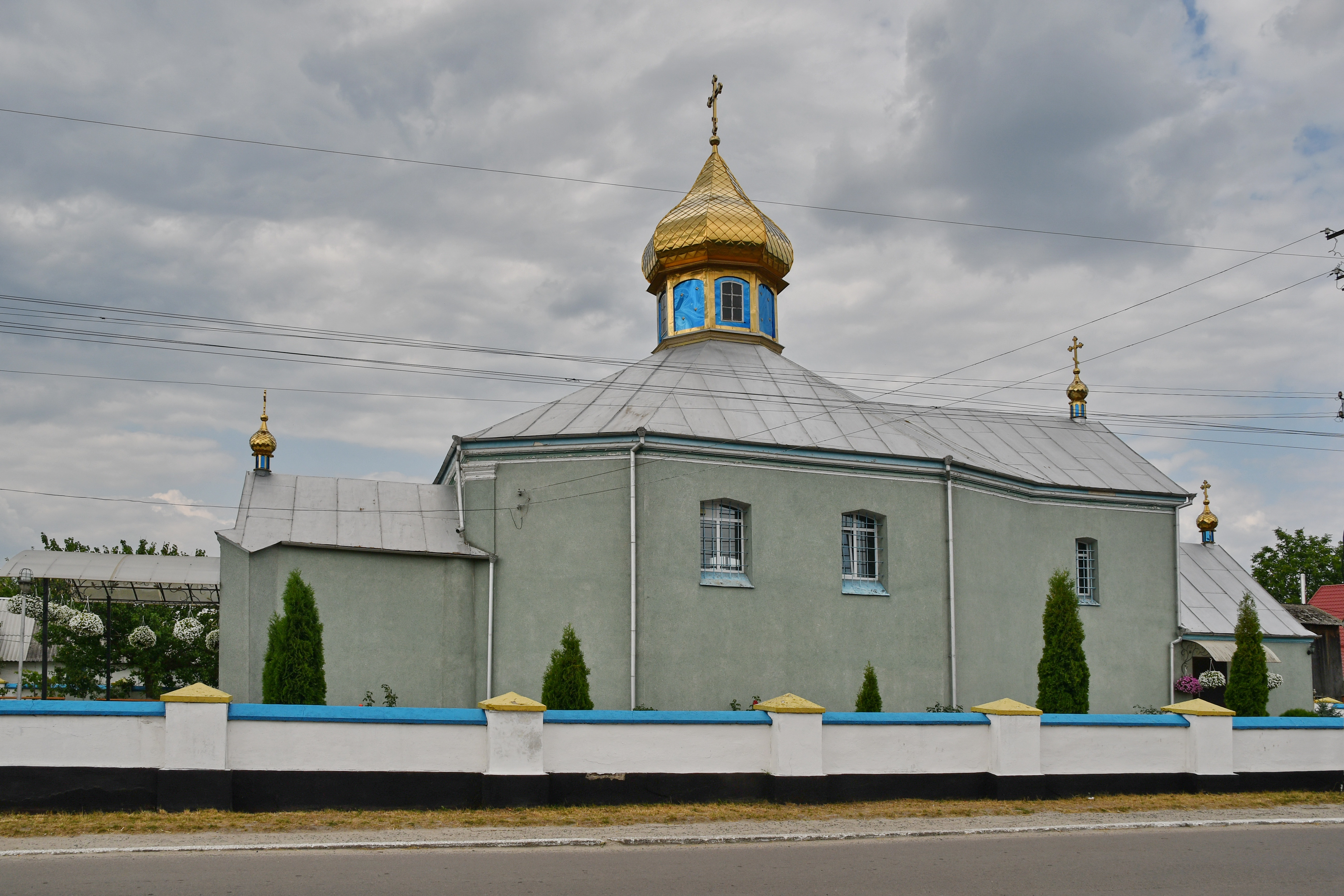
- Church of the Holy Cross

- Flag Coat of arms

- Location within Ukraine Derazhne (Ukraine)
- Coordinates: 50°51′44″N 26°02′58″E
- Country: Ukraine
- Oblast: Rivne Oblast
- Raion: Rivne Raion
- Hromada: Derazhne rural hromada
- Founded: 1274

Area
  - Total: 4.87 km^{2} (1.88 sq mi)
- Elevation: 175 m (574 ft)

Population (2001)
  - Total: 2,102
  - Density: 431.36/km^{2} (1,117.2/sq mi)
- Time zone: UTC+2 (EET)
  - Summer (DST): UTC+3 (EEST)
- Postal code (Index): 35053
- Area code: +380 3657

Derazhne (Ukrainian: Деражне, Polish: Deraźne) is a village located on the Horyn river in Rivne Raion of Rivne Oblast in western Ukraine. It was formerly administered within Kostopil Raion. In 2001, Derazhne had 2102 residents. Postal code — 35053. KOATUU code — 5623481601.

== History ==
Derazhne was mentioned for the first time in the historical sources in 1272. In 1626, Prince Janusz Ostrogski built here a church of the Holy Trinity. A new stone catholic church was built in 1804, and an Orthodox church in 1824. A Karaite Jewish (Karaim) community existed in Derazhne since the late 1500s. The community was severely damaged during the Chmielnicki uprising in 1649, and two poems about the destruction were written in Hebrew and Turkic Karaim language by the leader of the congregation, Hazzan Joseph ben Yesh'uah Ha-Mashbir. Apparently, a small Karaite community survived until the Haidamakas uprising in 1768

During the Second Polish Republic (1918-1939) Derazhne was the seat of the rural municipality in the district of Rivne Derażne, and from 1 January 1925, of Kostopol Volyn province. The Jewish population constituted 624 persons in 1921. After the Nazi German troops entered Derazhne on June 28, 1941, the ghetto was organized on October 5, 1941, and it was liquidated on August 24, 1942. 1,868 Jews were killed altogether in the nearby village of Osowa Wyszka by an Einsatzgruppen. About 70 Poles were also killed during the war with only one surviving Polish family, by Ukrainian policemen in German service and members of the Ukrainian Insurgent Army.

Under the Soviet rule Derazhne served as a district centre of Rivne Oblast. In 2010, a memorial for Ukrainian Insurgent Army freedom fighters was built in Derazhne.

== Notable people ==
- Nil Khasevych (1905-1952) - Ukrainian artist and OUN activist, served as a Judge in Derazhne during the Nazi occupation period in 1941.
- Rostislav Zass (1940-1999) - Ukrainian and Russian poet, lived for many years and was buried in Derazhne.
