= Simhah Pinsker =

Polish scholar and archaeologist (1801–1864)

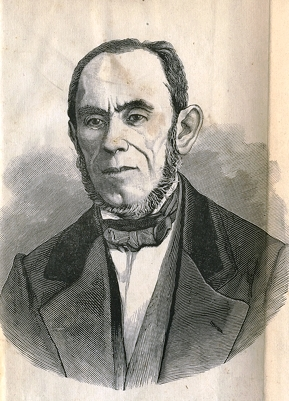
Simhah Pinsker

Simhah Pinsker (Hebrew: שמחה פינסקר, March 17, 1801 – October 29, 1864) was a Polish-Jewish scholar and archeologist born in Tarnopol, Habsburg East Galicia (now Ternopil, Ukraine). He received his early Hebrew education in a cheder and from his father, Shebaḥ ha-Levi, a noted preacher, who instructed him in mathematics and German language also. He was the father of Leon Pinsker.

== Early years ==
In his youth Pinsker was an enthusiastic admirer of Hasidic Judaism, but soon forsook it. He at first engaged in business, but, having no aptitude therefor, was obliged to abandon it. He then went to the free economic zone of Odessa, and, owing to his calligraphic skill, became secretary to the rabbi. Here, in conjunction with Isaac Horowitz of Brody and Littenfeld, Pinsker succeeded in establishing a public school for Jewish children, of which he himself served as principal until 1840.

== Research ==
At that time Abraham Firkovich, a Karaite scholar, brought to Odessa a number of ancient manuscripts, unearthed in the Crimea. Among these was one of the Later Prophets which had a singular punctuation, differing widely in the form of the vowels and singing-accents from the one then in use. This manuscript gave ample opportunity to Pinsker to satisfy his propensity for research. He at once set himself to the task of deciphering the system of punctuation, and satisfactorily accomplished it. He had already become known as an archaeologist of merit through his contributions to the Orient, but with this discovery his fame was established. He was thereupon honored by the Russian government with two gold medals and with the title "Honorable Citizen", and the community of Odessa bestowed upon him a life-pension of 300 rubles a year.

=== Liqqute Qadmoniyyot (ליקוטי קדמוניות) ===
Pinsker then retired from communal work, and repaired to Vienna in order to devote the rest of his life to his researches and to the arrangement and publication of his works. Of these the first and most important one was the Liqquṭe Qadmoniyyot (Hebrew: ליקוטי קדמוניות, Vienna, 1860), in which he describes the different periods of development in the history of Karaite Judaism. He maintains that the term "Karaite" is derived from the Hebrew "qara" (קרא) "to call," "to invite," and that its use dates from the first period of the schism, when the members of this sect sent messengers throughout Jewry "to invite" the people to join their ranks. Pinsker moreover attempts to show throughout the whole work that to the scholars of this sect who preceded the orthodox Biblical scholars and grammarians is due the correct system of Biblical orthography, grammar, and lexicography; and that even in their poetry the Karaites were models for the Hebrew poets of the Middle Ages, such as ibn Gabirol and Judah ha-Levi. (ib. p. 107). The Liqquṭe Qadmoniyyot made such an impression upon the scholarly world that Isaak Markus Jost and Heinrich Graetz publicly avowed their indebtedness to the author, the former even changing, in consequence, some of the views expressed in his history of the Jewish sects.

=== Mabo el ha-Nikkud ha-Ashshuri o ha-Babli ===
The other great work of Pinsker, published in his lifetime, was Mabo el ha-Niḳḳud ha-Ashuri o ha-Babli (Vienna, 1863), (Hebrew: מבוא אל הנקוד האשורי או הבבלי), an introduction to the Babylonian system of Hebrew punctuation; it contains the results of his examination of the manuscripts in the Odessa library. As an appendix to it is printed the Yesod Mispar, by Abraham ibn Ezra, on the Hebrew numerals.

=== Other works ===
Pinsker's other works are:

- an edition of the Sefer Mikhlol (Lyck, 1862), Hebrew grammar by David Qimhi, with emendations by Pinsker and others
- Sefer haEḥad (Odessa, 1867), on the nine cardinal numbers, by Abraham ibn Ezra, with commentary
- Mishle haGezerah wehaBinyan (Vienna, 1887), on the Hebrew verb.

Pinsker left, besides, a considerable number of manuscripts on the Hebrew language and literature. At Vienna, Pinsker lectured for some time at the beth midrash; but, his health soon failing, he was brought back by his children to Odessa, where he died on October 29, 1864.

== Jewish Encyclopedia bibliography ==
- Zederbaum, in Miẓpah, iv. 13–14;
- idem, in Ha-Meliẓ, 1864, No. 42;
- Ha-Maggid, 1865, Nos. 7-10;
- Monatsschrift, x. 176 et seq.;
- He-Ḥaluẓ, v. 56 et seq.;
- Mazkir li-Bene Reshef, in Ha-Shahar, i. 46 et seq.;
- H. S. Morais, Eminent Israelites of the Nineteenth Century, pp. 279 et seq., Philadelphia, 1880.
