= Şahin Giray =

Khan of Crimea from 1777 to 1783

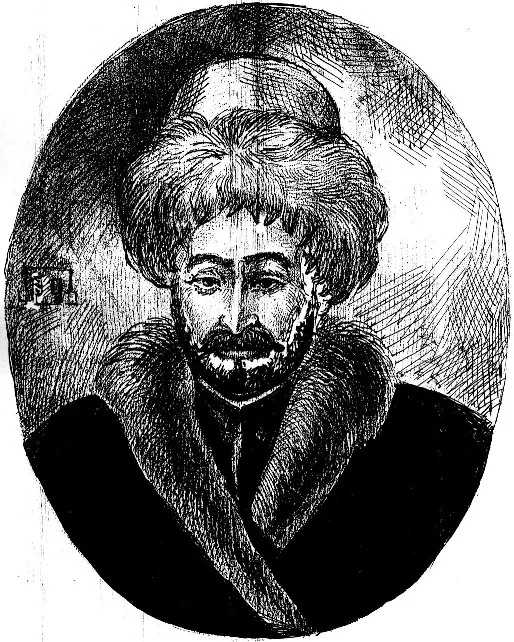
- Portrait of Şahin Giray, 1780s

Khan of Crimea
- 1st reign: 1777–1782
- Predecessor: Devlet IV Giray
- Successor: Bahadır II Giray
- 2nd reign: 1782–1783
- Predecessor: Bahadır II Giray
- Born: 1745; Edirne, Ottoman Empire
- Died: 1787 (aged 41–42); Rhodes, Ottoman Empire
- Burial: Rhodes, Greece
- Dynasty: Giray dynasty
- Father: Ahmed Giray
- Religion: Sunni Islam
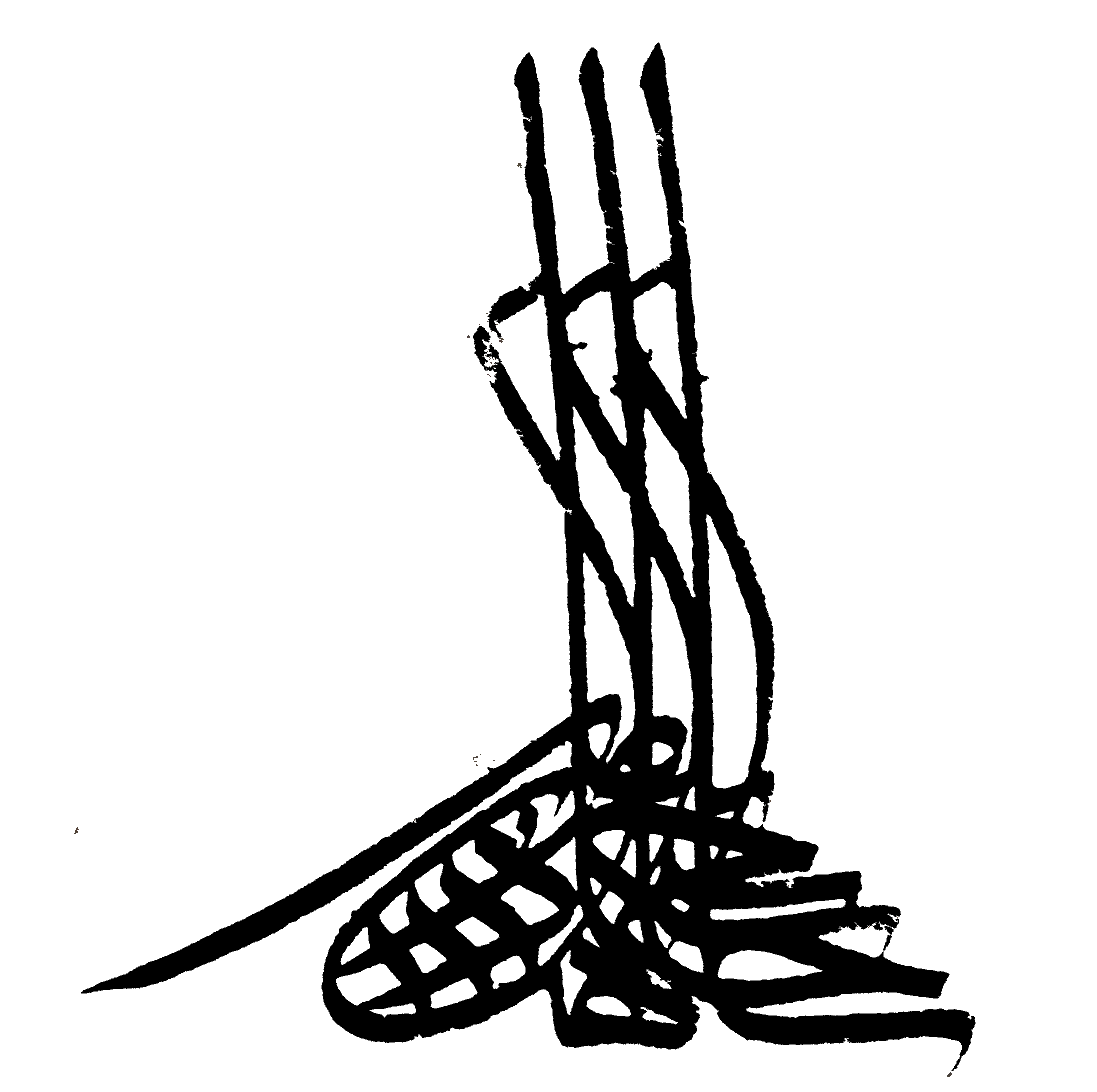
- Tughra

Şahin Giray (Note: Crimean Tatar, Ottoman Turkish and Persian: شاهین کرای) (1745–1787) was the last khan of Crimea on two occasions (1777–1782, 1782–1783).

== Life ==
He was born in 1745 in Edirne. He was the son of Ahmed Giray and the grandson of Devlet II Giray. He had a brother named Katti Giray. As a young child he grew up in Edirne. When his father died when he was young he was educated under his mother's supervision. The family then briefly stayed in Ottoman Greece in the city of Thessaloniki, before settling in the Republic of Venice. In Venice, he received a Western-style education. He reputedly spoke the Crimean Tatar language as well as Ottoman Turkish, Italian and Greek.

When he was 20, his uncle Crimean Khan Qırım Giray called him back to the Crimea from his foreign school whereupon he was installed as the Commander of Nogai Horde. In 1770, the Russian Empire won a great battle against the Ottoman Empire and sought an alliance with the Crimean Khanate against the Turks. Selim Giray declined the proposal, precipitating a surprise attack by Russia against the Khanate. The Khan sent envoys to Saint Petersburg to sue for peace. During this mission, Catherine II met Şahin Giray and wrote of him:

"The Crimean Prince is the most gentle Tatar, I have ever seen. He's very talented, good-looking, and writes poetry. He wants to see and learn everything."

In 1776, Şahin Giray succeeded his uncle to become Khan of Crimea. Sahin's rule was marked by upheaval. Russian expansion threatened the khanate from the 1730s up until the 1780s when they successfully seized the peninsula. During his brief reign, he embarked on a program to re-build and modernise the Crimean Khanate. These reforms centred on the economy and government infrastructure, but included opening factories and moving the capital from Bakhchisaray to the important trade city of Caffa. Şahin Giray developed a fiscal policy that included the restructuring of taxation among Christians and non-Christians. He attempted to equalize taxes, however Christian taxation was much heavier than non-Christian people, ultimately leading to tensions between the clergy and Russia. Militarily, Şahin Giray attempted to implement a new, more tolerant policy towards the Jewish and Christian minorities and integrating the two into the Muslim-majority military. However, his reforms were not well-received by the Nogai Tatar nobility or local aristocracy who both saw them as threatening their privileges and anti-Muslim, and by the common people who also saw this cross-religious integration as contradicting the laws of Islam.

Sahin's westernization policies led to rebellion in 1777. He was only able to resume control in 1778 thanks to the assistance of Catherine II and the Russian military. This turmoil turned into full civil war that led to Sahin's dethronement by Russia's Catherine the Great in 1783. Eventually, under enormous pressure from Russia and facing the inevitability of defeat, he agreed to annexation of the Khanate into the Russian Empire. As a result, he was compelled to move to Saint Petersburg, where he lived under house arrest. Despite warnings from Empress Catherine that his life could be in danger if he travelled to Turkey, he appealed to be allowed to move to Edirne, where he had spent much of his childhood. In 1787, Russia and the Ottoman Empire agreed to allow him to move to Edirne. This move was not the retirement he was expecting because the Ottoman authorities saw him as a possible challenger to the imperial Ottoman throne. Further, Sultan Abdul Hamid I regarded him as a traitor for surrendering Crimea to the Russians. He was moved under arrest to Constantinople and then Rhodes where, after a failed attempt to seek asylum at the French consulate there, he was executed later that year under the order of the sultan. His body was buried in an undisclosed location, while his head was sent to the sultan in Constantinople. His property, however, was not confiscated, and was returned to his remaining family in Edirne.

Şahin Giray's family lived in Burgazada, Constantinople after his execution.

== See also ==
- Benjamin Aga
