= Mikhail Kizilov =

- Born: 27 June 1974 (age 52); Simferopol

Academic background
- Education: Simferopol State University; Central European University; University of Oxford
- Thesis: The Karaites, a religious and linguistic minority in eastern Galicia (Ukraine) 1772–1945
- Doctoral advisor: R. J. W. Evans

Academic work
- Discipline: history
- Main interests: history of Crimea; Jews, Khazars and Karaism in Eastern Europe

Mikhail Kizilov (Ukrainian: Михаил Борисович Кизилов; born on 27 June 1974 in Simferopol) is a historian. He works on the history of Crimea in the Late Middle Ages and Modern Times and on Jews, Khazars and Karaism in Eastern Europe, especially in Crimea, Poland, Ukraine and Lithuania.

== Life ==
He studied history at the Simferopol State University, Medieval Studies at the Central European University in Budapest and Jewish and Hebrew Studies at the University of Oxford (2004–2007). From 2007, Kizilov holds a DPhil (PhD) in modern history from Oxford University (United Kingdom) with his dissertation The Karaites, a religious and linguistic minority in eastern Galicia (Ukraine) 1772–1945. His doctoral advisor was R. J. W. Evans.

Kizilov was a visiting scholar at the Simon Dubnow Institute in the winter semester from 2002 to 2003. His research interests include Karaite Studies, Jewish history in Eastern Europe, Holocaust, Roma studies, various aspects of Crimean history, Khazars, Krymchaks, Crimean Tatars, Subbotniki (Sabbatarians), the history of slavery in the Ottoman Crimea and Crimean Khanate, Mangup and Chufut-Kale, Roma (Gypsy) community of the Crimea, Karaim language, literature of the Crimean Jews in Turkic languages, and more.

Between 2000 and 2026 he published six academic and four popular monographs and also over two hundred articles in the English, Russian, German, Polish and Ukrainian languages. He also edited six collections of articles in the Russian language. Some of his studies were translated into French, Hebrew and Turkish. In his studies Kizilov uses sources and scholarship in about twenty modern and dead languages, including Slavic, European and Oriental languages.

== Awards ==
- 2008, Kreitman Fellow at Ben-Gurion University of the Negev (Beer Sheva, Israel).
- 2012 Judaica Bibliography Award from the Association of Jewish Libraries for his book Bibliographia Karaitica (2011).
- 2013-2014 Sosland Fellow of the Mandel Center for Advanced Holocaust Studies at the United States Holocaust Memorial Museum.

== Works ==
=== Thesis ===
- The Crimea According to Descriptions of European Travellers from the Thirteenth to the Sixteenth Centuries (MA thesis). Budapest: Central European University. 1997.
- Kizilov, Mikhail (2007). The Karaites, a religious and linguistic minority in eastern Galicia (Ukraine) 1772-1945 (Ph.D. thesis). University of Oxford. OCLC 500538115.

=== Books ===
- Kizilov, Mikhail (2003). Karaites through the Travelers' Eyes. Ethnic History, Traditional Culture and Everyday Life of the Crimean Karaites According to Descriptions of the Travelers. Qirqisani Center for the Promotion of Karaite Studies. ISBN 9780970077561.
- Kizilov, Mikhail (2009). The Karaites of Galicia: An Ethnoreligious Minority Among the Ashkenazim, the Turks, and the Slavs, 1772-1945. Leiden / Boston: Brill, 2009 (Studia Judaeoslavica. Vol. 1). 461 pp.
- Kizilov, Mikhail (2015). The Sons of Scripture. The Karaites in Poland and Lithuania in the Twentieth Century. Warsaw / Berlin: De Gruyter, 2015.
- Walfish, Barry Dov; Kizilov, Mikhail (2010-12-17). Bibliographia Karaitica. An Annotated Bibliography of Karaites and Karaism. Karaite Texts and Studies. Volume 2. Karaite Texts and Studies. Vol. 43 / Études sur le judaïsme médiéval, Volume: 43. doi:10.1163/ej.9789004189270.i-810. ISBN 978-90-04-21472-9.
- Кизилов, Михаил (2011). Крымская Иудея: очерки истории евреев, хазар, караимов и крымчаков в Крыму с античных времен до наших дней. Доля. ISBN 9789663663869.
- Кизилов, М.Б. (2015). Крымская Готия: История и судьба. ISBN 978-5-9906988-0-2.
- Кизилов, Михаил, Никифорова, Людмила. Айн Рэнд. Москва: Молодая Гвардия, 2020 (=ЖЗЛ. Т. 2013).
- Kizilov, Mikhail. La Judée Criméenne. Histoire du Judaїsme en Crimée. Translated from Russian by Jean-Claude Fritsch. Simferopol: Dolia, 2016.

=== Selected articles ===
- Kizilov, Mikhail (2007-01-01). "Slave trade in the early modern Crimea from the perspective of Christian, Muslim, and Jewish sources". Journal of Early Modern History. 11 (1–2). Brill: 1–31. doi:10.1163/157006507780385125.
- Kizilov, Mikhail. “Karaite Pies and Samurai Swords: The Karaite Theme in David Shrayer-Petrov’s Life, Fiction, and Memoirs.” Kwartalnik Historii Żydów / Jewish History Quarterly 3 (2021): 857-876.
- Kizilov, Mikhail. “It Was the Poles that Gave Me Most Pain”: Polish Slaves and Captives in the Crimea, 1475–1774.” In Slavery in the Black Sea Region, c. 900–1900. Forms of Unfreedom at the Intersection between Christianity and Islam. Edited by Felicia Roşu. Leiden–Boston, 2022, 145-186.
- Kizilov, Mikhail. “Re-reading Rand through a Russian Lens.” Journal of Ayn Rand Studies 21:1 (2021): 105-110.
- Kizilov, Mikhail. “Polish Slaves and Captives in the Crimea in the Seventeenth Century.” Acta Orientalia Hungaricae 73:2 (2020): 251-265.
- Kizilov, Mikhail. “Crimean Museum Collections as a Source of Information on Jewish History, Religion, Culture, and Everyday Life.” In Moreshet Israel: A Journal for the Study of Judaism, Zionism and Eretz Israel 16 (2018): 67-92.
- Kizilov, Mikhail. “Karaites and Communism: The Positive Side of the Relations of the East European Karaites with Bolshevik and Soviet Authorities.” Karaite Archives 4 (2017): 61-75.
- Kizilov, Mikhail. “National Inventions: The Imperial Emancipation of the Karaites from Jewishness.” In An Empire of Others. Making Ethnographic Knowledge in Imperial Russia and the USSR. Edited by Roland Cvetkovski and Alexis Hofmeister. Budapest–New York: Central European University Press, 2014, 369-394.
