= Trakai Kenesa =

Former synagogue in Trakai, Lithuania

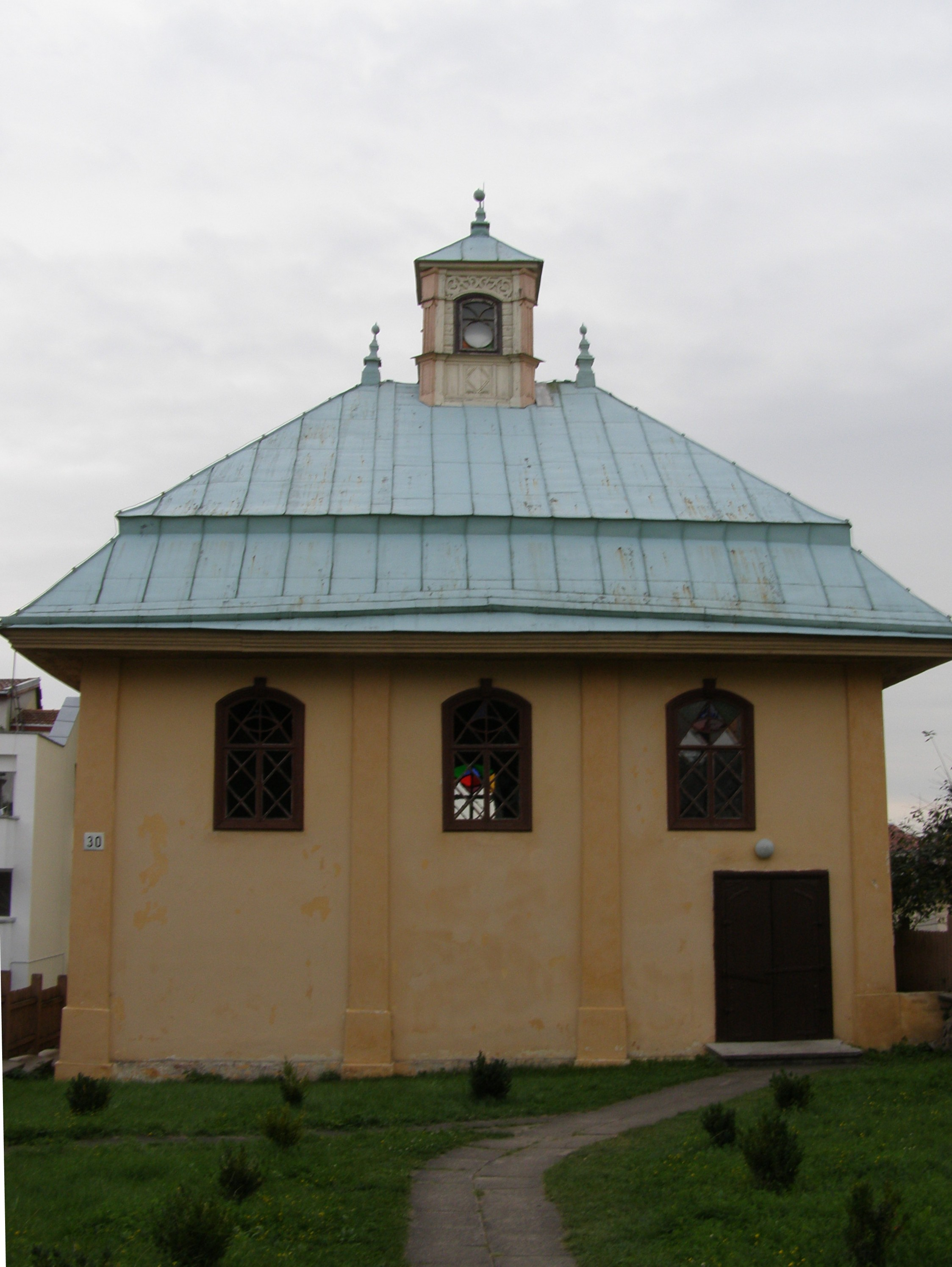
- The former synagogue in 2010

- Location of the former synagogue in Lithuania

Religion
- Affiliation: Karaite Judaism (former)
- Ecclesiastical or organizational status: Synagogue (c. 1800– ); Jewish museum (since )
- Status: Inactive (as a synagogue); Repurposed

Location
- Location: 30 Karaimų Street, Trakai, Vilnius County
- Country: Lithuania
- Interactive map of Trakai Kenesa
- Coordinates: 54°38′52″N 24°55′58″E

Architecture
- Type: Wooden synagogue
- Style: Baroque Revival
- Completed: c. 1800
- Materials: Timber

The Trakai Kenesa is a former Karaite Jewish congregation and synagogue, or kenesa, located at 30 Karaimų Street, in Trakai, in the Vilnius County of Lithuania.

Designed in the Baroque Revival style, the wooden synagogue was completed in c. 1800, restored in the 1890s. Built on a rectangular plan and covered with a hipped roof with a small annex, the synagogue was larger than the surrounding houses. The building is a rare example of one of the surviving kenesas of the former Polish–Lithuanian Commonwealth. (Note: A source states that: The synagogue was dismantled at the request of the authorities towards the end of March 1966. The cause for the demolition was ... the regulation of Trocka Street. The former site of the synagogue currently houses garages and warehouses.) The building now operates as a Jewish museum.

== See also ==
- History of the Jews in Lithuania
- Lithuanian Jews
