= Karaim language =

Kipchak Turkic language with Hebrew influences

Karaim
- къарай тили karaj tili
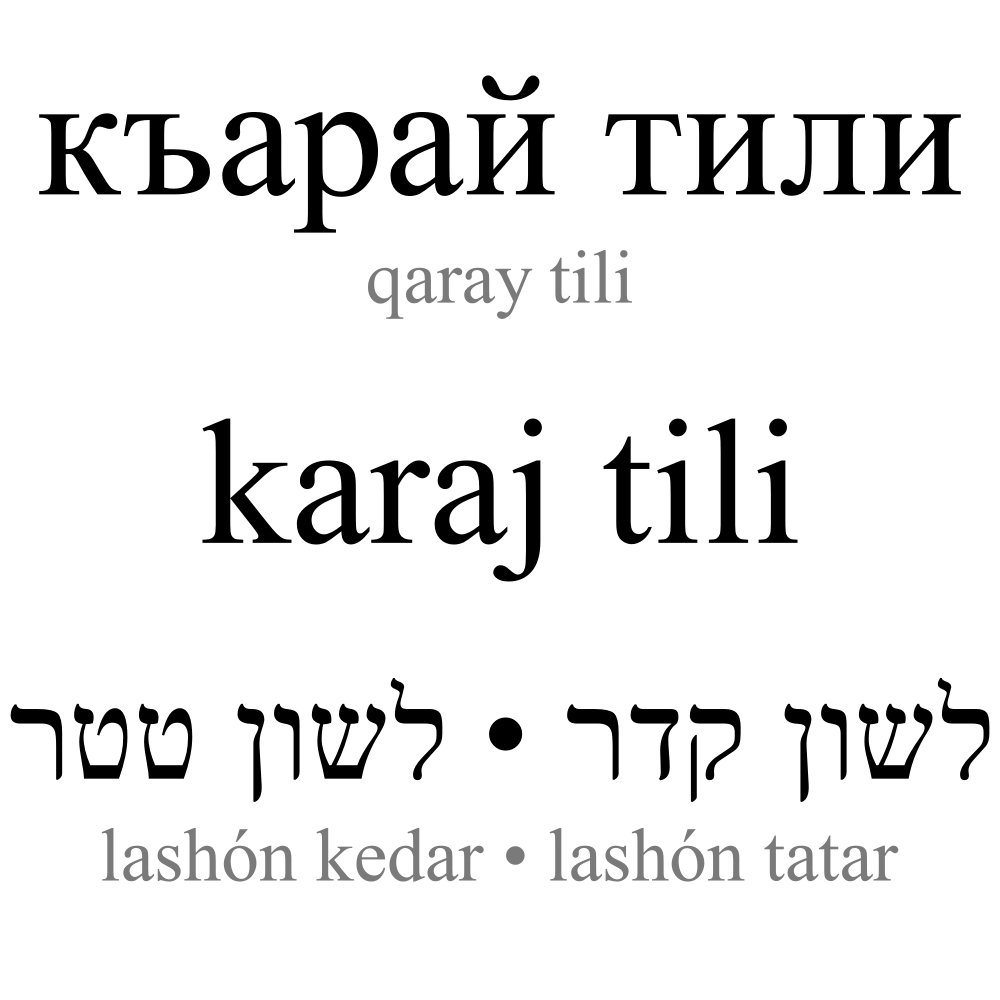
- Karaim written in Cyrillic and Latin (Crimean dialect), Latin (Trakai dialect), along with Hebrew and Latin (Traditional)
- Native to: Crimea, Lithuania, Poland
- Ethnicity: Crimean Karaites
- Native speakers: 80 (2014)
- Language family: Turkic: Common Turkic; Kipchak; Kypchak–Cuman; Karaim
- Writing system: Cyrillic script, Latin script, Hebrew alphabet

Official status
- Recognised minority language in: Poland; Ukraine; Russia

Language codes
- ISO 639-3: kdr
- Glottolog: kara1464
- ELP: Karaim

The Karaim language (Crimean dialect: къарай тили, qaray tili; Trakai dialect: karaj tili), also known by its Hebrew name Lashon Kedar (Hebrew: לשון קדר, lit. 'language of the nomads'), is a Turkic language belonging to the Kipchak group, with Hebrew influences, similarly to Yiddish or Judaeo-Spanish. It is presently spoken by only a few dozen Crimean Karaites (Qrimqaraylar) in Lithuania, Poland, Crimea, and Galicia in Ukraine. The three main dialects are those of Crimea, Trakai-Vilnius and Lutsk-Halych, all of which are critically endangered. The Lithuanian dialect of Karaim is spoken mainly in the town of Trakai by a small community living there since the 14th century.

There is a chance the language will survive in Trakai as a result of official support and because of its appeal to tourists coming to the Trakai Island Castle, where Crimean Karaites are presented as the castle's ancient defenders.

== History ==
=== Karaims in Crimea and Lithuania ===
The origin of the Karaims living in Crimea is subject to much dispute and inconsistency. Difficulty in reconstructing their history stems from the scarcity of documents pertaining to this population. Most of the known history is gathered from correspondence between the populations of Karaims and other populations in the 17th to 19th centuries. Furthermore, a large number of documents pertaining to the Crimean population of Karaims were burned during the 1736 Russian invasion of the Tatar Khanate's capital, Bakhchisarai.

Some scholars say that Karaims in Crimea are descendants of Karaite merchants who migrated to Crimea from the Byzantine Empire. In one particular incidence, migration of Karaites from Constantinople (modern-day Istanbul) to Crimea is documented following a fire in the Jewish quarter in 1203. After the Turco-Mongol invasions, settlement of merchants in Crimea may have been encouraged in the 13th and 14th centuries by the active trade routes from Crimea to China and Central Asia.

On the other hand, "many scholars consider Karaims as descendants of Khazars and, later, Polovtsi tribes" who supposedly converted to Karaite Judaism. Kevin Alan Brook considered the link to the Khazars as historically inaccurate and implausible because the Khazars converted to Rabbinical Judaism and the Karaims lack Turkic DNA.

The third hypothesis says that Karaims are the descendants of Israelite tribes from the time of the first exile by an Assyrian king (720s BCE). The Karaim scholar Abraham Firkovich collected the documents arguing in favor of this theory before the Russian Tsar. He was of the opinion that Israelites from Assyria had gone into the North Caucasus and from there, with the permission of the Assyrian king into the Crimean peninsula. He also claimed that he has found the tombstone of Yitzhak ha-Sangari and his wife who he claimed were Karaims. Whether Firkovich forged some of the tombstone inscriptions and manuscripts is controversial.

Regarding the origin of the Karaims in Lithuania also there is no complete consensus yet between the scholars. According to Lithuanian Karaim tradition they came from Crimea in 1392 when the Grand Duke Vytautas of Lithuania allied with Tokhtamysh against the White Horde Tatars and relocated 330 Karait families to Lithuania. Although linguistically sound, and in agreement with the tradition of the Lithuanian Tatars, claiming their origin from the collapsed Golden Horde, some modern historians doubt this assumption. Nevertheless, Karaims settled primarily in Vilnius and Trakai, maintaining their Tatar language; there was also further minor settlement in Biržai, Pasvalys, Naujamiestis and Upytė. Despite a history through the 16th and 17th centuries that included disease, famine, and pogroms, Lithuania was somewhat less affected by such turmoil than the surrounding areas. As a result, the Lithuanian Karaims had a relative sense of stability over those years, and maintained their isolation as a group, keeping their Turkic language rather than abandoning it for the local languages.

=== Genetic affiliation of the Karaim language ===
Karaim is a member of the Turkic language family, a group of languages of Eurasia spoken by historically nomadic peoples. Within the Turkic family, Karaim is identified as a member of the Kipchak languages, in turn a member of the Western branch of the Turkic language family. Within the Western branch, Karaim is a part of the Ponto-Caspian subfamily. This language subfamily also includes the Crimean Tatar of Ukraine and Uzbekistan, and Karachay-Balkar and Kumyk of Russia. The close relation of Karaim to Kypchak and Crimean Tatar makes sense in light of the beginnings of the Lithuanian Karaim people in Crimea.

One hypothesis is that Khazar nobility converted to Karaite Judaism in the late 8th or early 9th century and were followed by an unknown portion of the general population. This may also have occurred later, under Mongol rule, during an influx of people from Byzantium.

As all Turkic languages, Karaim grammar is characterized by agglutination and vowel harmony. Genetic evidence for the inclusion of the Karaim language in the Turkic language family is undisputed, based on common vocabulary and grammar. Karaim has a historically subject–object–verb word order, extensive suffixing agglutination, the presence of vowel harmony, and a lack of gender or noun classes. Lithuanian Karaim has maintained most of these Turkic features despite its history of more than six hundred years in the environment of the Lithuanian, Polish, Belarusian and Russian languages.

Most of the religious terminology in the Karaim language is Arabic in etymology, showing the origins of the culture in the Middle East. Arabic and Persian had the earliest influences on the lexicon of Karaim, while later on in its history, the Russian, Ukrainian, and Polish languages made significant contributions to the lexicon of Karaims living in Russia, Ukraine, Poland, and Lithuania.

== Language ecology ==
=== Distribution of Karaim speakers ===
Today, there are Karaim speakers living in Crimea, Lithuania, Poland, Israel, and the United States. However, there only remain about 200 Karaims in Lithuania, only one quarter of whom are competent speakers of the Karaim language.

Karaim can be subdivided into three dialects. The now-extinct eastern dialect, known simply as Crimean Karaim, was spoken in Crimea until the early 1900s. The northwestern dialect, also called Trakai, is spoken in Lithuania, mainly in the towns of Trakai and Vilnius. The southwestern dialect, also known as the Lutsk or Halich dialect, spoken in Ukraine, was near-extinct with only six speakers in a single town as of 2001. Crimean Karaim is considered to make up the "Eastern group," while the Trakai and Lutsk dialects comprise the "Western group."

=== Language contact ===
Throughout its long and complicated history, Karaim has experienced extensive language contact. A past rooted in Mesopotamia and persisting connections to the Arab world resulted in Arabic words which likely carried over via the migration of Karaites from Mesopotamia. The Karaim language was spoken in Crimea during the rule of the Ottoman Empire, so there is also a significant history of contact with Turkish, a distant relative in the Turkic language family. Finally, Karaim coexisted with Lithuanian, Polish, Ukrainian, and Russian as a minority language in the other areas to which it dispersed where Karaims lived and had to speak the dominant majority languages.

Karaim speakers show a strong tendency towards code-copying. Code-copying differs from code-switching in that speakers don't just switch from one language to another, but actually transfer lexical items and grammatical features from one language to another in processes that may be only for single instances, or that may have much more lasting effects on language typology. Extensive code-copying is indicative both of the ever-shrinking population of Karaim speakers (leading to an insufficient Karaim lexicon and a high frequency of borrowing from Russian, Polish, and Slavonic languages) and of the high level of language contact in the regions where Karaim is spoken.

=== Multilingualism ===
Due to the very small number of speakers of Karaim and the high level of multilingualism in Lithuania in general, there is also a high level of multilingualism among Karaim speakers. Karaim speakers also communicate with the dominant languages of their respective regions, including Lithuanian, Polish, and Russian. Some also have religious knowledge of Hebrew. Multilingualism is a necessity for Karaim speakers, because without other languages the majority would not even be able to communicate with members of their own family.

=== Language health ===
Most dialects of Karaim are now extinct. Maintenance of the Karaim language in Lithuania is now endangered due to the dispersal of Karaim speakers under the Soviet regime in the aftermath of World War II and the very small number and old age of fluent speakers remaining. Children and grandchildren of Karaim speakers speak Lithuanian, Polish, or Russian, and only the oldest generation still speaks Karaim.

== Phonology ==
=== Consonant inventory ===
		Labial	Alveolar	Postalveolar	Palatal	Velar	Uvular
Nasal		m	n				
Plosive	voiceless	p	t			k	
Plosive	voiced	b	d			ɡ	
Fricative	voiceless	f	s	ʃ ⟨š/sz⟩			χ ⟨ch⟩
Fricative	voiced	v ⟨v/w⟩	z	ʒ ⟨ž/ż⟩			ʁ ⟨h⟩
Approximant		w ⟨u/ł⟩	r		j		

=== Vowel inventory ===
	Front		Back	
	unrounded	rounded	unrounded	rounded
Close	i	y ⟨ü⟩	ɯ ⟨y⟩	u
Mid	e	ø ⟨ö⟩		o
Open			ɑ ⟨a⟩	

=== Phonotactics ===
Trakai Karaim shows harmony in palatalization of consonants. Thus, in any given word, only palatalized or only non-palatalized consonants can be found. Palatalized consonants occur in the presence of front vowels, and non-palatalized consonants occur in the presence of back vowels. Similarly to most Turkic languages, virtually all of the consonants in Karaim exist in both a palatalized and a non-palatalized form, which may be further evidence of their genetic relationship. However, care must be taken in assuming as much, because Karaim has been in contact with the Lipka Tatar language in Lithuania for hundreds of years.

Karaim also exhibits vowel harmony, whereby suffix vowels harmonize for front or back quality with the vowels in the stem of a word.

== Morphology ==
Karaim morphology is suffixing and highly agglutinating. The Karaim language lacks prefixes but uses postpositions. Nouns are inflected for seven cases (nominative, genitive, dative, accusative, ablative, locative, and instrumental, which is rare in other Turkic languages). A notable feature of verb conjugation in Karaim is the possibility of abbreviated forms.

the verb [ał], "to take":
		Long form	Short form
1st person	singular	ał-a-myn	ał-a-m
1st person	plural	ał-a-byz	—
2nd person	singular	ał-a-syn	ał-a-s
2nd person	plural	ał-a-syz	—
3rd person	singular	ał-a-dyr	ał-a-d ~ ał-a-dy
3rd person	plural	ał-dyr-łar	ał-d-łar ~ ał-dy-łar

== Syntax ==
Historically, Karaim had a typically Turkic SOV word order. However, it appears to have acquired somewhat free word order due to extensive language contact situations, and currently has a preference for SVO constructions. Due to the agglutinative nature of Karaim morphology, pronominal subjects are frequently dropped as the same information is already represented in the inflection of the main verb. Karaim is head-final and uses postpositions.

Karaim syntax exhibits multiple instances of code-copying, whereby Karaim merges with syntactic properties of other languages in its area due to strong language contact situations. The impact of such language contact is also evident in the Karaim lexicon, which has extensive borrowing. In more modern times, the significant borrowing is also representative of insufficiencies in the lexicon.

== Writing system ==
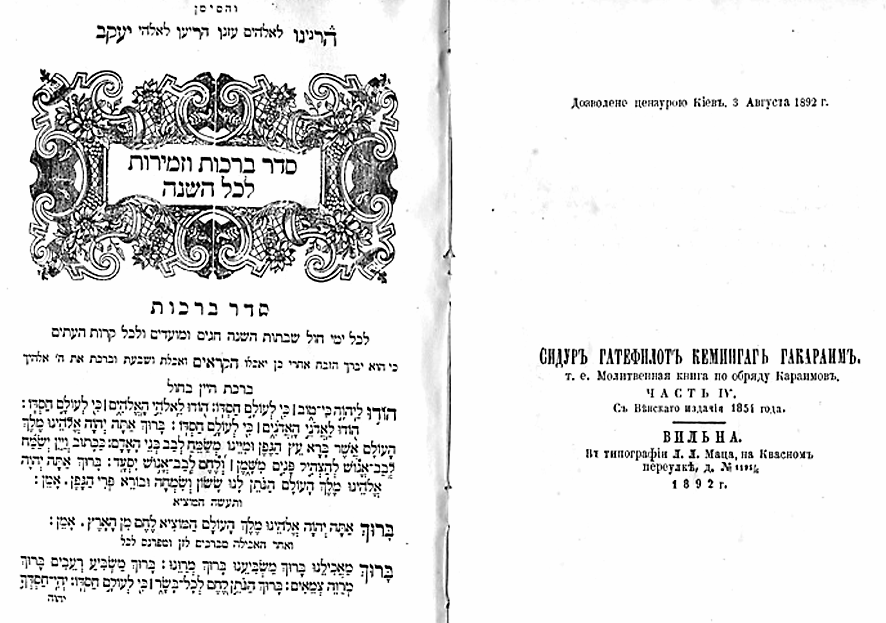
A page from a Karaim prayer book (Siddur) from Vilnius, Lithuania 1892.

The traditional script of the Karaites in the Hebrew alphabet was used until the 20th century. In many Karaite families, they still have Hebrew letter handwritten collection of texts of diverse content, referred to as "miedžuma". The Karaim language has also been protected through translated religious works, such as bibles. Throughout the 20th century, the Karaite communities also used various modifications of Latin (Yañalif, Lithuanian and Polish alphabets) and Cyrillic alphabets.

Romanized alphabet of the Karaites of Crimea (Yañalif)

A a	B ʙ	C c	Ç ç	D d	E e	F f	G g
H h	I i	J j	Q q	Ƣ ƣ	L l	M m	N n
Ꞑ ꞑ	O o	Ɵ ɵ	P p	S s	Ş ş	Ь ь	K k
U u	V v	Y y	R r	T t	X x	Z z	Ƶ ƶ

=== Modern alphabets ===
In Lithuania and Poland, a modified Latin alphabet is used to write in Karaim, while in Crimea and Ukraine, it was written using Cyrillic script. From the 17th century up until the 19th century, Hebrew letters were used.

==== Cyrillic ====
The Karamim Cyrillic alphabet is used to write by the Karaites in Crimea. It is based on the Crimean Tatar Cyrillic alphabet, which is in turn based on the Russian alphabet, but it has three additional letters (two single letters and one digraph): Ӧ, Ӱ and Хъ.

А а	Б б	В в	Г г	Гъ гъ	Д д	Дж дж	Е е
Ж ж	З з	И и	Й й	К к	Къ къ	Л л	М м
Н н	Нъ нъ	О о	Ӧ ӧ	П п	Р р	С с	Т т
У у	Ӱ ӱ	Ф ф	Х х	Хъ хъ	Ц ц	Ч ч	Ш ш
Щ щ	Ъ ъ	Ы ы	Ь ь	Э э	Ю ю	Я я

- Letters Е, Ю and Я used only after Л as an indicator of softness
- Letters Ж and Ц used only in Russian borrowings

==== Latin ====
The Karaim Latin alphabet is used to write by the Karaites in Lithuania and Poland. Unlike other Turkic languages that follows the common Turkic alphabet, the Latin alphabet for Karaim is a hybrid orthography which mixes Lithuanian and other Latin-based alphabets such as Czech, Slovak, Polish, and Estonian.

A a	B b	C c	Ch ch	Č č	D d	Ď ď	Dž dž
E e	Ė ė	F f	G g	H h	I i	Y y	J j
K k	L l	Ľ ľ	M m	N n	Ń ń	O o	Ö ö
P p	R r	S s	Ś ś	Š š	T t	Ť ť	U u
Ü ü	V v	Z z	Ž ž	Ź ź

== Dialectology ==
Pritsak 1959 treats the Turkic varieties of the Karaim community as a dialect of the Karaim language and distinguishes between the northwestern variety (Lithuanian or Trakai Karaim), the southwestern variety (Halich Karaim) and the eastern variety (Crimean Karaim). These communities share a common religious, historical and cultural tradition, and these breeds are linguistically related. Even so, the differences between the varieties spoken in the Halich and Lithuanian communities are so great that the users of both varieties prefer Russian or Polish when communicating with each other. The present differences are partly due to their development from different Kipchak breeds and partly due to the different linguistic environments that influenced their later development.

== See also ==
- Krymchak language
- Crimean Tatar language
- Urum language
- Armeno-Kipchak language

== Sources ==
- Akhiezer, Golda (2003). "The history of the Crimean Karaites during the sixteenth to eighteenth centuries". In Polliack, Meira (ed.). Karaite Judaism: A Guide to its History and Literary Sources. Boston: Brill. pp. 729–757.
- Brook, Kevin Alan (2018). The Jews of Khazaria (3rd ed.). Rowman & Littlefield Publishers. pp. 210–216. doi:10.5040/9798881833770. ISBN 978-1-5381-0342-5.
- Csató, Éva Ágnes (2001). "Syntactic code-copying in Karaim". In Dahl, Östen; Koptjevskaja-Tamm, Maria (eds.). Circum-Baltic Languages. Studies in Language Companion Series. Vol. 1: Past and Present. pp. 271–283. doi:10.1075/slcs.54.15csa. ISBN 978-90-272-3057-7.
- Csató, Éva Ágnes (2002). "Karaim: a high-copying language". In Jones, Mari C.; Esch, Edith (eds.). Language Change: The Interplay of Internal, External and Extra-Linguistic Factors. Walter de Gruyter. ISBN 9783110892598.
- Csató, Éva (Winter 2012). "Lithuanian Karaim". Journal of Endangered Languages. 1 (1): 33–45.
- Dahl, Östen; Koptjevskaja-Tamm, Maria, eds. (2001). The Circum-Baltic languages. Vol. 1: Past and present. Amsterdam: John Benjamins. ISBN 1588110206. OCLC 302343232.
- Hansson, Gunnar Ólafur (2007). "On the evolution of consonant harmony: the case of secondary articulation agreement". Phonology. 24: 77–120. doi:10.1017/S0952675707001121. S2CID 57216802.
- Kizilov, M. (2009). The Karaites of Galicia: An ethnoreligious minority among the Ashkenazim, the Turks, and the Slavs, 1772-1945. Leiden–Boston: Brill. ISBN 978-90-04-16602-8. OCLC 611961832.
- Napora, Kamila (26 November 2018). "Karaim Culture in Trakai". Kami and the Rest of the World. Archived from the original on 20 October 2023.
- Németh, Michał (2003). "Grammatical features". Karaimi. Związek Karaimów Polskich w RP. Archived from the original on 16 July 2011.
- Schegoleva, Tatiana (29 May 2011). "Karaites of Crimea: History and Present-Day Situation in Community". Analytics. Jews of Eurasia. Archived from the original on 4 July 2017.
- Schur, Nathan (1995). "Karaites in Lithuania". The Karaite Encyclopedia. Archived from the original on 28 December 2007.
- Tsoffar, Ruth (2006). Stains of Culture: an Ethno-Reading of Karaite Jewish Women. Detroit: Wayne State University Press.
- Tütüncü, Mehmet; Bowman, Inci (1998). "Karaim Homepage". Stichting Onderzoek Turkestan. Archived from the original on 26 November 2007.
- Wexler, Paul (1980). "The Byelorussian Impact on Karaite and Yiddish". Journal of Belarusian Studies. 4 (3–4): 99–111. doi:10.30965/20526512-0040304001.
- Zajaczkowski, Ananiasz (1961). Karaims in Poland. Warsaw: Mouton.
