= List of philosophers of religion =

List of Wikipedia articles about philosophers of religion

This is a list of philosophers of religion.

== A ==
- A. J. Ayer
- AN Whitehead
- Aaron ben Elijah
- Adi Shankara
- Al-Ghazali
- Aleksei Losev
- Alvin Plantinga
- Anselm of Canterbury
- Antony Flew
- Aristotle
- Aruni
- Augustine of Hippo
- Avicenna

== B ==
- Bahya ibn Paquda
- Baruch Spinoza
- Basava
- Benedict Ashley
- Bhāskara
- Boethius
- Brian Davies

== C ==
- Charles De Koninck
- Charles Hartshorne
- Confucius

== D ==
- DT Suzuki
- David Hume
- David Kimhi
- David Nieto
- David ibn Merwan al-Mukkamas
- Dmitry Merezhkovsky
- Dogen

== E ==
- Elia del Medigo
- Emanuel Swedenborg
- Epicurus
- Eugene Halliday

== F ==
- Friedrich Nietzsche
- Friedrich Schleiermacher
- Frithjof Schuon

== G ==
- Gabriel Marcel
- G. K. Chesterton
- Georg Wilhelm Friedrich Hegel
- George Tyrell
- Gersonides
- Guru Nanak

== H ==
- Hai Gaon
- Hoter ben Shlomo
- Huston Smith

== I ==
- Immanuel Kant
- Isaac Alfasi
- Isaac Canpanton
- Isaac Cardoso
- Isaac Nathan ben Kalonymus
- Isaac Orobio de Castro
- Isaac ben Sheshet
- Isaac ibn Latif

== J ==
- J.P. Moreland
- Jacob Abendana
- Jacob Anatoli
- Jacques Derrida
- Jacques Maritain
- Jedaiah ben Abraham Bedersi
- Jeshua ben Judah
- Johann Georg Hamann
- John Duns Scotus
- John Hick
- John of St. Thomas (John Poinsot)
- Joseph Solomon Delmedigo
- Joseph ben Abraham
- Joseph ibn Tzaddik
- José Faur
- Jiddu Krishnamurti

== K ==
- Kundakunda

== L ==
- Lao Tzu
- D. G. Leahy
- Leon of Modena

== M ==
- Madhvacharya
- Maimonides
- Melville Y. Stewart
- Mircea Eliade
- Moses Narboni

== N ==
- Nishida Kitaro
- Nicholas Wolterstorff

== P ==
- Paul Tillich
- Pavel Florensky
- Peter Abelard
- Plato
- Plotinus

== R ==
- Ralph McInerny
- Ramanuja
- Reginald Garrigou-Lagrange
- Richard Swinburne
- Robert Cummings Neville

== S ==
- Saadia Gaon
- Said Nursi
- Salomon Maimon
- Samuel ibn Tibbon
- Sergei Bulgakov
- Seyyed Hossein Nasr
- Shem-Tov ibn Falaquera
- Solomon
- Solomon ibn Gabirol
- St. Thomas Aquinas
- Stephen R.L. Clark
- Søren Kierkegaard

== T ==
- Thomas Cajetan

== V ==
- Vallabha
- Vasily Rozanov
- Vladimir Solovyov

== W ==
- Walter Benjamin
- Walter Terence Stace
- Wesley Wildman
- Whitall Perry
- William James
- William Lane Craig
- William Paley

== Y ==
- Yeshayahu Leibowitz
- Yiḥyah Qafiḥ

== X ==
- Xenophanes

== Z ==
- Zachary A. Behlok

== É ==
- Étienne Gilson

== See also ==
- Index of philosophy of religion articles
