= Judeo-Arabic literature =

Judeo-Arabic literature is a digraphic and diglossic corpus body of Arabic-language writing produced by Jewish communities across the Arab-ruled and wider Islamic and Arabic ecumene. Written in either the Arabic or Hebrew abjad, it served internal communal purposes, including legal and religious instruction, as well as koiné communication with Arabic-speaking non-Jewish societies. Its genres included biblical commentary, responsa, poetry, chronicles, philosophy, medicine, letters and journalism. It flourished under the Abbasids and in Umayyad al-Andalus, where Arabic vernaculars existed alongside Hebrew as a liturgical language. Sephardic and Mizrahi communities continued these traditions from Yemen and Iraq to Morocco and India. Later works also absorbed elements from Turkish and European languages. Judeo-Arabic philosophical and grammatical writing supplied vocabulary and syntactic models used in the revival of Modern Hebrew.

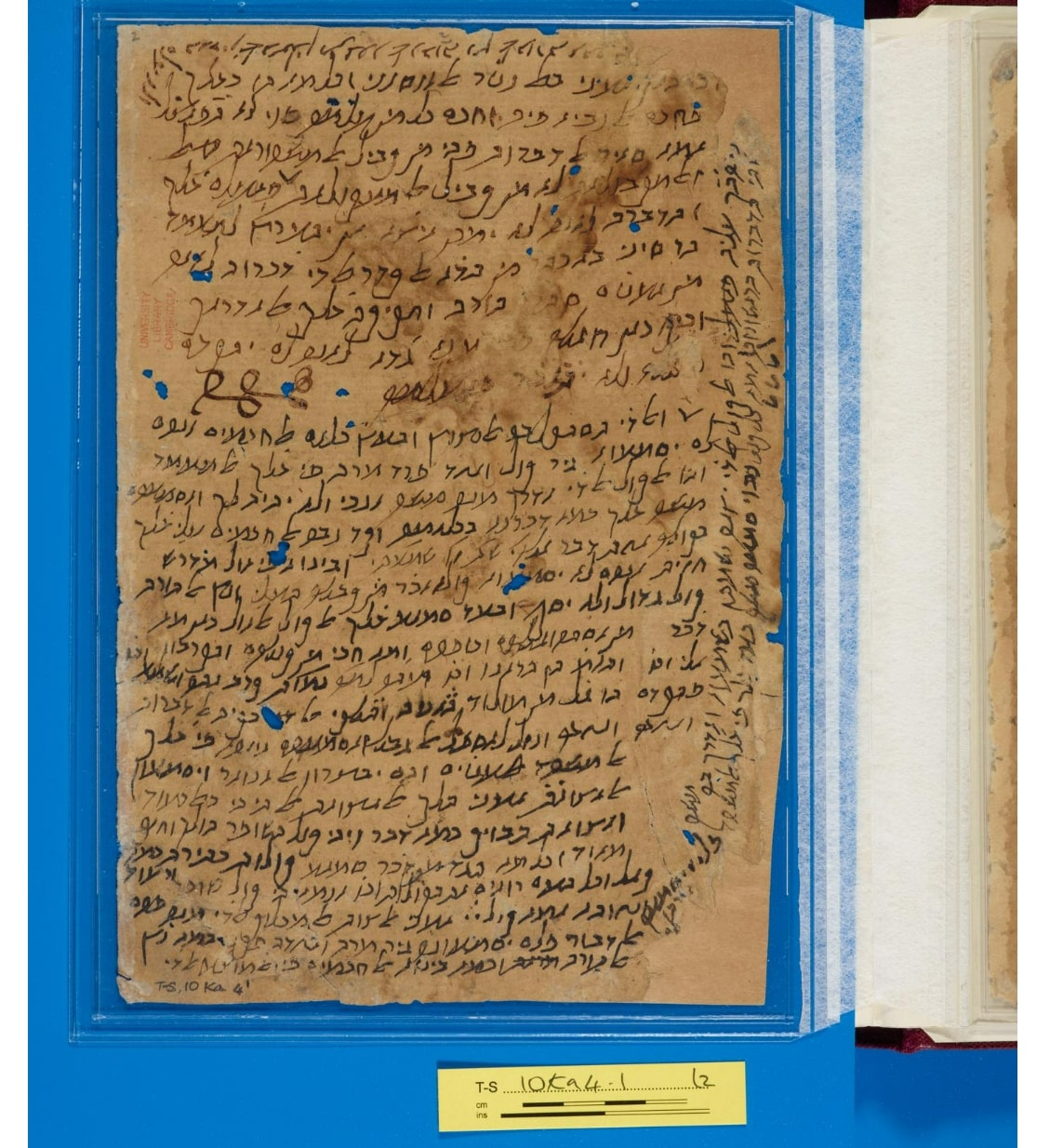
A draft in Maimonides' own hand of the Guide for the Perplexed, written in Judeo-Arabic with Hebrew characters, c. 1185–1190.

The term covers several linguistic registers and writing practices rather than one unified literary canon. Medieval Jewish communities used local spoken varieties in everyday communal life. Most Judeo-Arabic texts were written in the Hebrew abjad, although Jewish archives also contain many manuscripts in Arabic script.

Major philosophers composed works in Judeo-Arabic that were later translated into Hebrew through the Tibbonid network. Across much of the medieval Arab world, Judeo-Arabic was also used as a prestigious literary medium. The Cairo Geniza is its largest surviving archive and preserves letters, legal texts, commentaries and translations.

Regional centres such as Al-Andalus, Ifriqiya, Bilad al-Sham and Iraq developed their own social and literary varieties, including Moroccan, Egyptian, Syrian, Iraqi and Yemeni forms. Jewish writers also translated Arabic scientific, philosophical, theological and medical learning into Hebrew.

The corpus includes theology, philosophy, legal writing, grammar, medicine, letters and poetry. Well-known works include Saadia Gaon's Arabic commentary on the Torah, Bahya ibn Paquda's Duties of the Heart, Judah Halevi's Kuzari and Maimonides' Guide for the Perplexed.

== Definition and terminology ==
Judeo-Arabic refers to spoken dialects, Hebrew-script writing, and formal prose. It blends local Arabic with Hebrew and Aramaic elements, ranging from phonetic speech to Classical styles.

Orthographical Defining Judeo-Arabic strictly as Arabic in Hebrew script identifies specific manuscript traditions but excludes Jewish works in Arabic script and includes non-Jewish texts

Definitions based on community give priority to Jewish authorship, even when a work's readership extended beyond Jewish circles. Institutional definitions instead ask how a text functioned within Jewish communal practice. This approach reflects actual use but may exclude isolated manuscripts whose Jewish context cannot be reconstructed. Judeo-Arabic should also be distinguished from Arabic-influenced Hebrew poetry, Hebrew grammar and philosophy, which belong to medieval Hebrew literature even when they draw heavily on Arabic models.

As an academic category, Judeo-Arabic makes comparison possible, although it also applies an external etic framework that may not match how medieval writers and readers understood their own texts nor present an emic viewpoint.

== History ==
=== Early periods ===
Judeo-Arabic literature first circulated orally. Arabic-speaking Jewish communities explained biblical stories, law and prayer through teaching, preaching and storytelling, while proverbs, poems, songs and laments passed through recitation and performance. Cambridge researchers note a “shared interest in poetry between Jews and Muslims from the 7th century onwards”, although most surviving manuscripts are later. Popular poems based on biblical and midrashic narratives were later “read, recited or sung” during festivals and rituals. Surviving examples tell the stories of Joseph and Esther and lament Hannah and her seven sons.

Jewish traditions also entered early Islamic Isra'iliyyat, although material preserved only in Muslim sources is not itself Judeo-Arabic literature. The Arabic poetry of the pre-Islamic Jewish poet Samaw'al ibn 'Adiya likewise belongs to the wider history of Arabic poetry, because its language “did not differ from that of his Arab contemporaries”.

Hebrew remained the language of scripture and liturgy, while Aramaic dominated rabbinic law. Arabic initially served as a language of explanation for audiences who did not fully understand the sacred texts. Oral teaching could be adapted to local listeners, but its wording, authorship and context were unstable.

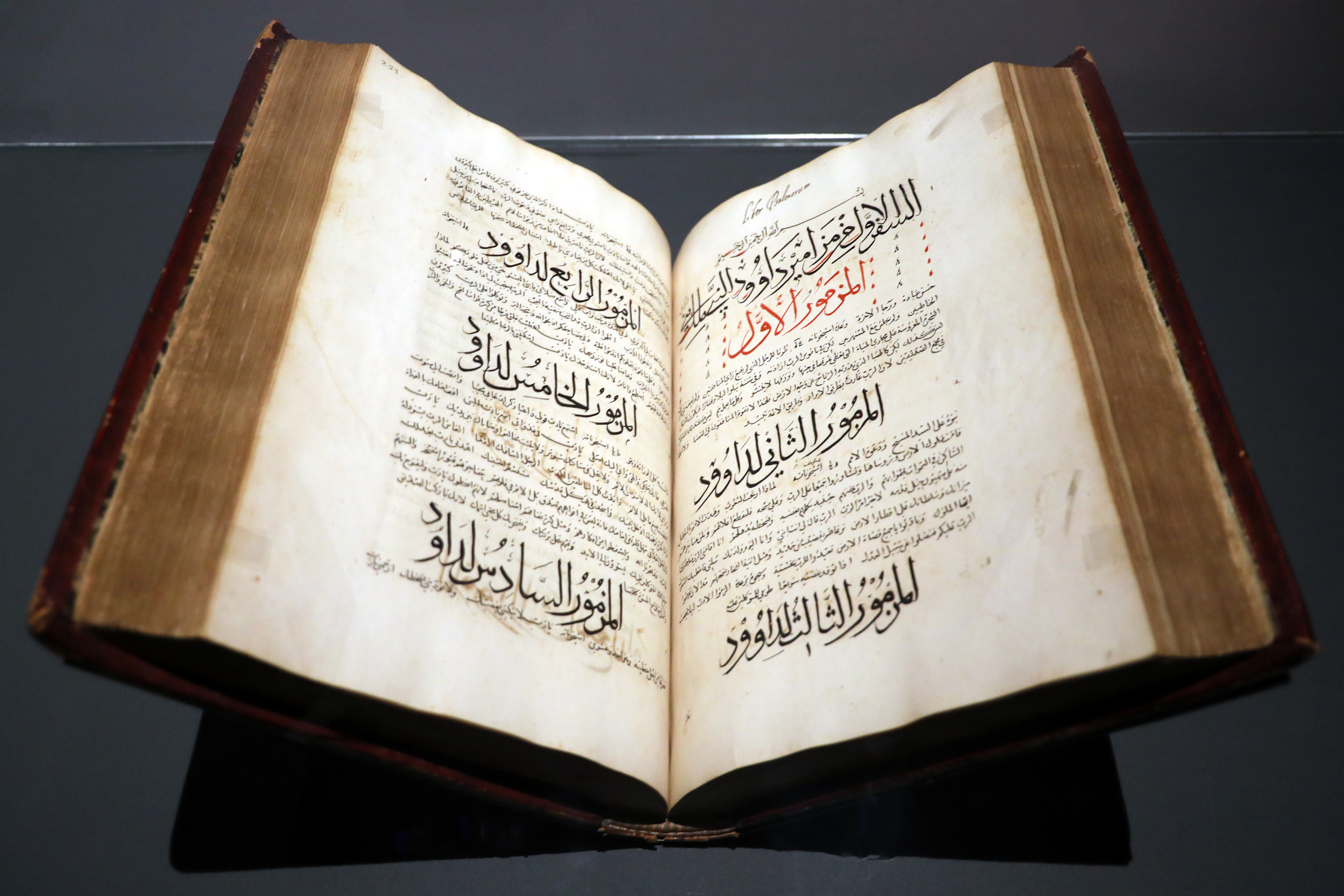
A late sixteenth-century copy of Saadia Gaon's Arabic translation of the Bible.

From the eighth and ninth centuries, oral explanations began to produce glosses, word lists and partial translations in Hebrew characters. Translation and explanation (tafsīr and sharḥ) emerged as the earliest major written genre. Making Hebrew scripture accessible while introducing Quranic or Islamic philosophy subtexts through Arabic vocabulary.

=== Expansion ===
Paul Fenton describes the medieval corpus as a “vigorous and variegated output of Arabic literature written by Jews”. Under the Abbasid Caliphate, Arabic became a “lingua franca for all walks of life and in all cultural milieus”, and Jews were “part and parcel of the greater Islamic culture”. Baghdad linked the academies of Sura and Pumbedita with Jewish communities in Khurasan, Palestine, Egypt, Ifriqiya, al-Andalus and Yemen. These connections grew under Abbasid caliphs including Al-Mansur, Harun al-Rashid, Al-Ma'mun and Al-Muqtadir.

Robert Brody calls Sura and Pumbedita “prestigious and internationally renowned academies”. Their Geonim, among them Sherira Gaon, Hai Gaon, Samuel ben Hofni and Saadia Gaon, answered questions about marriage, inheritance, commerce, ritual and communal administration. Brody defines responsa literature as questions sent by Jews “from communities around the world” and the replies issued by scholars at the academies.

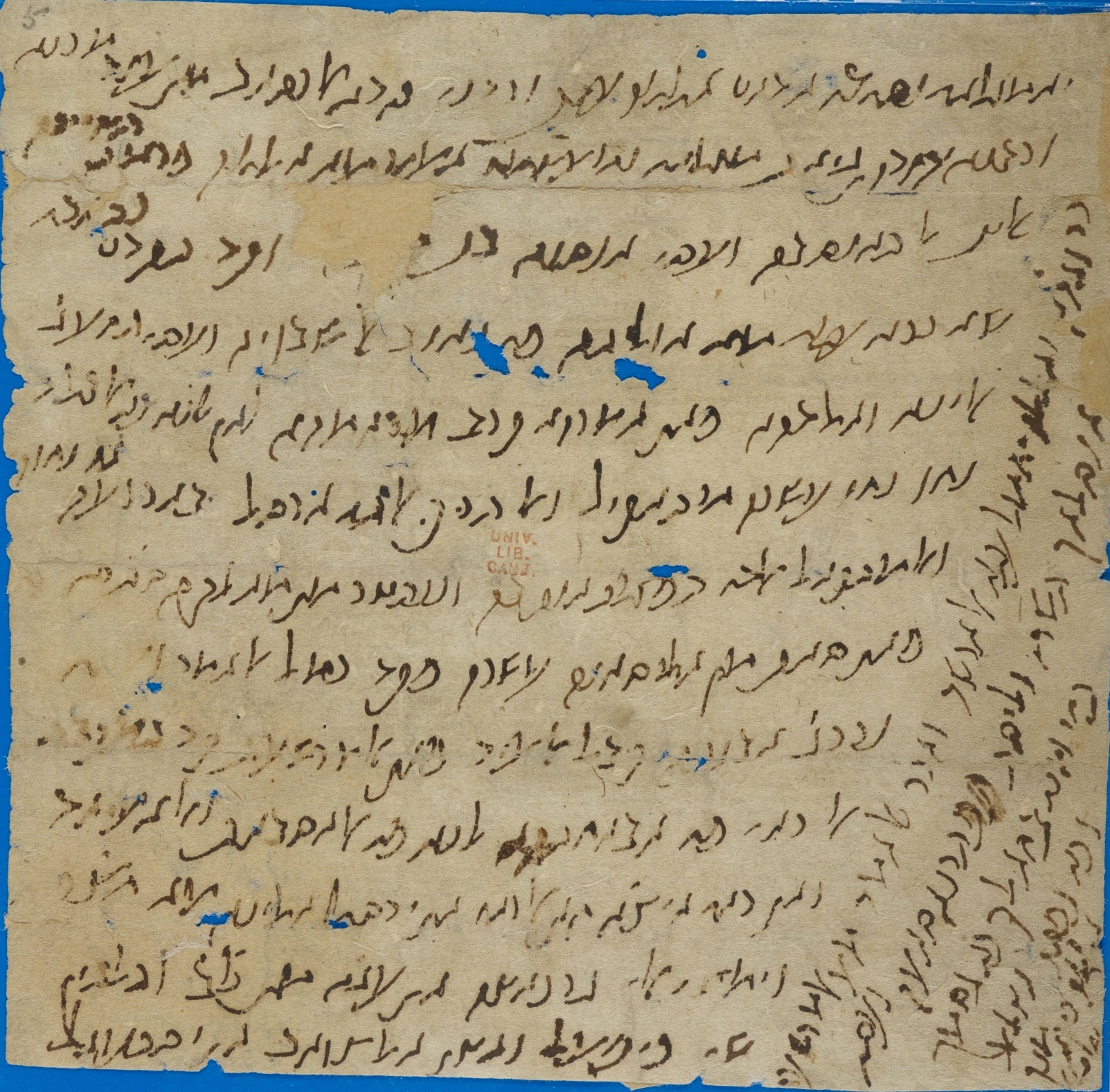
A Judeo-Arabic letter in which Judah Halevi wrote to the merchant Ḥalfon ben Nathaniel about the ransom of a female prisoner in Toledo.

Sherira's Epistle, for example, replied to scholars in Qayrawan. Paper, merchants, professional scribes and travelling students carried books, correspondence and legal decisions between Iraq and regional communities.

Judeo-Arabic writing spread into biblical translation and exegesis, legal collections, kalām, polemic, heresiography, grammar, lexicography, philosophy, medicine and epistolography. David ibn Merwan al-Mukkamas wrote an early systematic theology. Saadia's Tafsīr combined translation with interpretation, while his Kitāb al-Amānāt wa-l-Iʿtiqādāt was “the first major work of medieval Jewish philosophy”. Samuel ben Hofni produced legal, exegetical and theological works, while Nissim ben Jacob and Chananel ben Chushiel represented the scholarship of Qayrawan.

Conflict between Rabbanites and Karaites added to the exegetical and polemical corpus. Jacob Qirqisani combined law with sectarian history in the Kitāb al-Anwār wa-l-Marāqib. Yefet ben Ali wrote extensive verse-by-verse commentary, David ben Abraham al-Fasi compiled the Kitāb Jāmiʿ al-Alfāẓ, and Abu al-Faraj Harun developed Karaite grammatical study. Joseph al-Basir and Jeshua ben Judah adapted Muʿtazilite arguments. These traditions grew in Abbasid and Buyid Iraq and in Karaite Jerusalem, where doctrinal competition encouraged classification, quotation and clearer definitions of belief.

Regional dynasties supported other centres. Under the Arab Aghlabid rulers of Ifriqiya, Qayrawan became a “chief center of commerce and learning”. Its Jewish community “expanded and prospered” and remained connected with Babylonia, Palestine and Egypt. Isaac Israeli ben Solomon served the last Aghlabid emir, Ziyadat Allah III, while Dunash ibn Tamim continued Qayrawan's medical, scientific and philosophical work.

In the Caliphate of Córdoba, Hasdai ibn Shaprut was physician and adviser to the Umayyad caliph Abd al-Rahman III and became the “acknowledged representative of Spanish Jewry”. His patronage of Menahem ben Saruq, Dunash ben Labrat and the Córdoba academy reduced reliance on rulings from Babylonia. During the reigns of Abd al-Rahman III and Al-Hakam II, Córdoba joined Zaragoza, Lucena and Toledo as a centre of Arabic and Hebrew learning.

The taifa kingdoms formed further courtly networks. Samuel ibn Naghrillah served the Zirid rulers Habbus al-Muzaffar and Badis ibn Habus in Granada, supported poets and scholars, and represented what one literary history calls the “multidimensional character of the court Jew”. Judah ibn Kuraish, Judah ben David Hayyuj and Jonah ibn Janah applied Arabic grammatical methods to Hebrew. Bahya ibn Paquda wrote the Kitāb al-Hidāya, Judah Halevi used philosophical dialogue in the Kuzari, and Moses ibn Ezra examined Hebrew poetry through Arabic poetics.

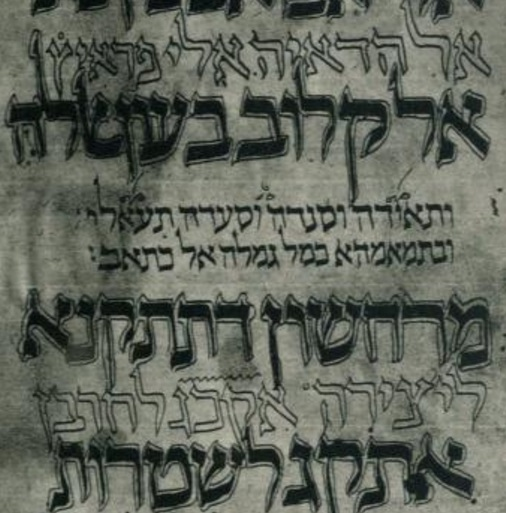
A manuscript of Bahya ibn Paquda's Duties of the Heart, first written in Judeo-Arabic as the Kitāb al-Hidāya ilā Farāʾiḍ al-Qulūb.

After al-Muʿizz conquered Egypt for the Fatimids, Fustat and Cairo connected Egypt with Palestine, Syria, Yemen and the western Mediterranean. The “lion’s share” of surviving Geniza documents dates from the Fatimid, Ayyubid and early Mamluk periods.

Maimonides wrote the Commentary on the Mishnah, Book of Commandments, Guide for the Perplexed and many letters in Judeo-Arabic, but used Hebrew for the Mishneh Torah. In Ayyubid Egypt he became the “official physician at Saladin’s royal court”. His son Abraham Maimonides combined legal and exegetical writing with pietistic ideas and practices comparable to Sufism.

The Geniza records both named scholars and a broader population of judges, officials, teachers, physicians, merchants, scribes and shopkeepers. Its letters also preserve the voices of women and wage workers, including an Alexandrian woman writing about bereavement and property and a shop assistant's wage record.

=== Later periods ===
Judeo-Arabic continued after the classical period in pietistic writing, biblical commentary, lexicography and regional sharḥ. In Egypt, Abraham Maimonides composed the Compendious Guide for the Servants of God, while Tanhum of Jerusalem wrote Arabic biblical commentaries and the lexicon al-Murshid al-kāfī. Natan'el al-Fayyumi produced the Yemeni philosophical and theological work Bustān al-ʿuqūl. Other regional traditions included explanations of prayer, sermons, ethical manuals, fables, saints' stories, letters, songs and oral tales.

Vernacular writing reached readers and listeners beyond scholarly circles. Teachers and performers used it for religious instruction, while laypeople, including women, wrote Judeo-Arabic in business and personal correspondence, as shown by the Cairo Geniza. Writing in spoken varieties made texts easier to use locally, although differences in spelling and vocabulary limited understanding between Iraqi, Yemeni, Egyptian and Maghrebi readers.

Nineteenth-century printing extended Judeo-Arabic into newspapers, fiction, drama, history and instructional writing. Tunisia produced the largest printed corpus. The National Library of Israel refers to “hundreds of original stories and translations” by about 150 Tunisian authors.

Judeo-Arabic printing in Tunisia began in 1862 with printers such as Tapia, Chemama and Elmaleh. Sarfati printed popular narratives, and Tayyib founded al-ʿAmāla al-tūnisiyya in 1878. Hagège edited several periodicals, published Anwār Tūnis, and compiled a 1939 bibliography that preserved information about Tunisian Judeo-Arabic writers and publications that were otherwise poorly documented.

Hagège described a weak commercial market in which books were commonly borrowed rather than bought, summed up in the phrase “one buys, ten read”. Borrowing widened readership but reduced income for printers and authors. Many writers therefore maintained other occupations. Hagège himself worked in printing, journalism, pharmacy and the herbal trade.

In Tunisia during the 1930s and 1940s, translated fiction was read aloud to both children and adults. Hai Sitruk adapted Robinson Crusoe, The Mysteries of Paris and stories about Alexander the Great. His shortened Ḥikāyat Robinson Krusoi appeared in editions printed in Tunis and Sousse. In Morocco, popular Judeo-Arabic nonfiction appeared as “single pages, pamphlets or small books” dealing with Jewish law, ethics, culture, history and Zionist thought. Guedj connects this literature with Hebrew printing presses, new intellectual elites, secularisation and Jewish nationalism. Jacob Elkrief's Hemed Bahurim of 1919, the later Ha-Madrikh pamphlets and works by Baruch Assabag addressed readers who had limited knowledge of Hebrew.

Baghdadi Jewish migrants carried Judeo-Arabic writing to India. The ANU Museum states that they “carried their Judeo-Arabic language and literature with them” and “continued to regard Baghdad as their spiritual center”. Bombay published Doresh Tov le-ʿAmmo from 1855 to 1866. In Calcutta, Eleazar ben Aaron Saadiah Iraqi ha-Cohen founded a Hebrew press in 1840, followed by publications including Mevasser, Peraḥ, Maggid Meisharim and Shoshannah. Solomon Twena edited newspapers and published nearly seventy works. Printing made texts available to more readers, but it also regularised spelling and favoured works with commercial appeal. Colonial schooling and the growing use of Standard Arabic among Jewish writers reduced the place of Hebrew-script Judeo-Arabic.

Large-scale migration after 1948 broke apart many of the neighbourhoods, schools, presses and reading communities that had sustained Judeo-Arabic. War, decolonisation, government policy and migration also interrupted the teaching of Arabic literacy and Hebrew-script writing. Arabic increasingly became a language of memory rather than one of formal education and publication.

Snir argues that an “unspoken agreement” between Zionism and Arab nationalism excluded Arab-Jewish identity in favour of separate Jewish-Zionist and Muslim-Arab identities. Iraqi-Jewish writers who moved to Israel initially continued to write Arabic poetry, fiction and journalism. Most later stopped because their readers, newspapers and publishers disappeared and Hebrew became institutionally dominant. A small number moved successfully into Hebrew, often by adopting the Zionist “master narrative”.

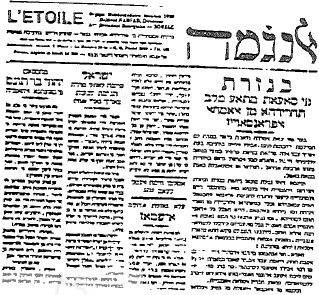
Al-Nijma, a Judeo-Arabic newspaper issued in Sousse, Tunisia.

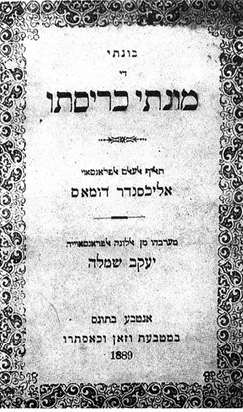
A Judeo-Arabic edition of The Count of Monte Cristo published in 1889.

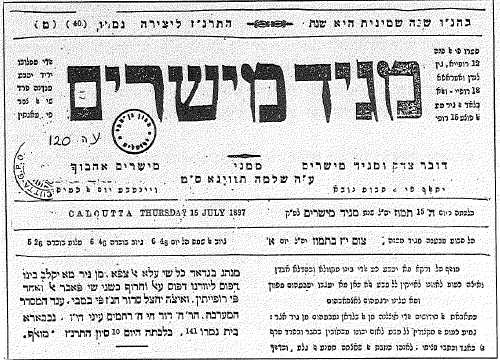
Maggid Mesharim, produced in Calcutta for Baghdadi Jewish readers.

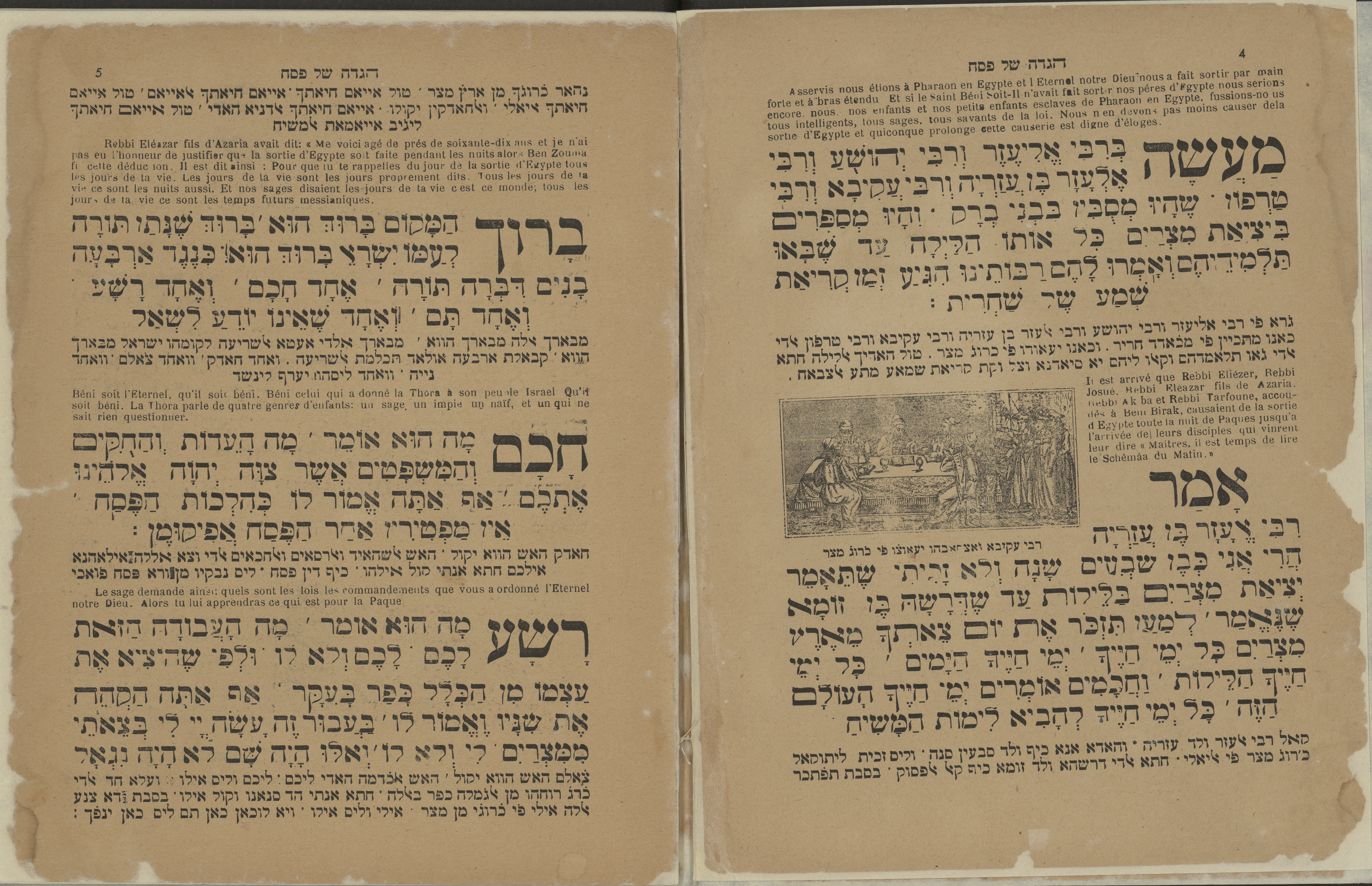
A Hebrew, Judeo-Arabic and French Passover Haggadah printed in Tunis in 1920.

== Language ==
Most Judeo-Arabic texts use Hebrew characters, although Arabic script appears in some Karaite, scientific and public works. The Jewish Language Project states that “written Judeo-Arabic generally uses Hebrew characters”, sometimes supplemented with additional diacritics. Early orthography often represented local speech phonetically. From about the tenth century, writers increasingly used a more classicising system that matched Arabic consonants in a regular way. This made learned texts easier to circulate between regions, although it could obscure local pronunciation.

== Manuscript and Print culture ==
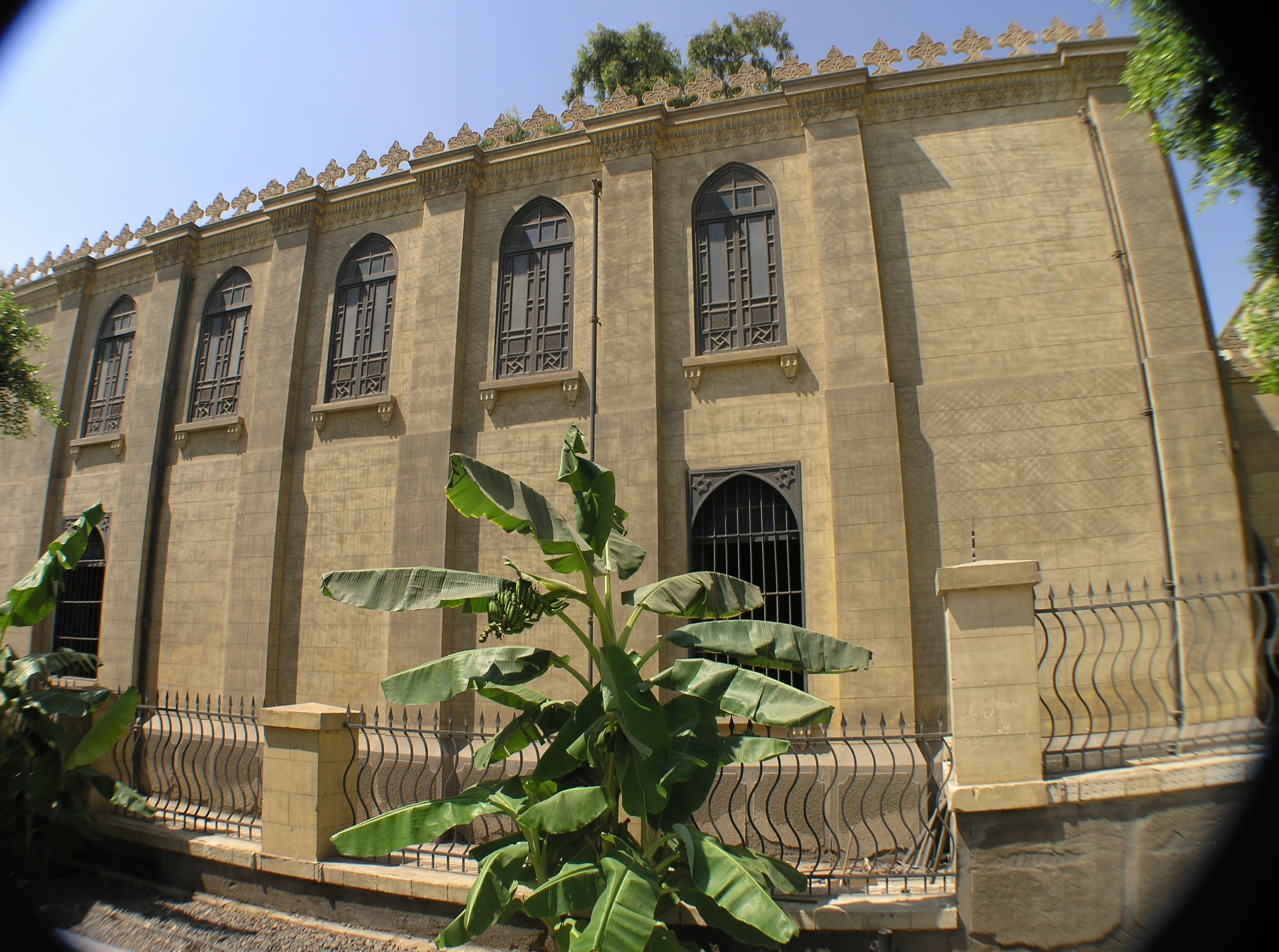
The Ben Ezra Synagogue in Fustat, which is associated with the Cairo Geniza.

The Cairo Geniza preserved about 400,000 fragments. The Princeton Geniza Project estimates that roughly ninety per cent come from extended literary texts, while the rest consist of letters, deeds, accounts, lists and other documents. The material originated not only in Egypt but also in Iraq, Iran, Yemen, Syria, North Africa, Iberia, Sicily and India.

Princeton describes the Geniza as “a snapshot of everyday life over the past thousand years”. Biblical translations, theology, philosophy, medicine and poetry survive beside merchants' accounts, household expenses, legal records and complaints about wages, illness and travel. These sources document women, artisans, servants, shopkeepers and business partners as well as prominent scholars.

The fragments are difficult to interpret. Many have no date, title or named author, and leaves from the same codex are often divided among different libraries. Copyists corrected wording, inserted glosses, changed spelling and rearranged page layouts. A modern edition of a “work” may therefore combine evidence from several stages of transmission.

== Legacy ==
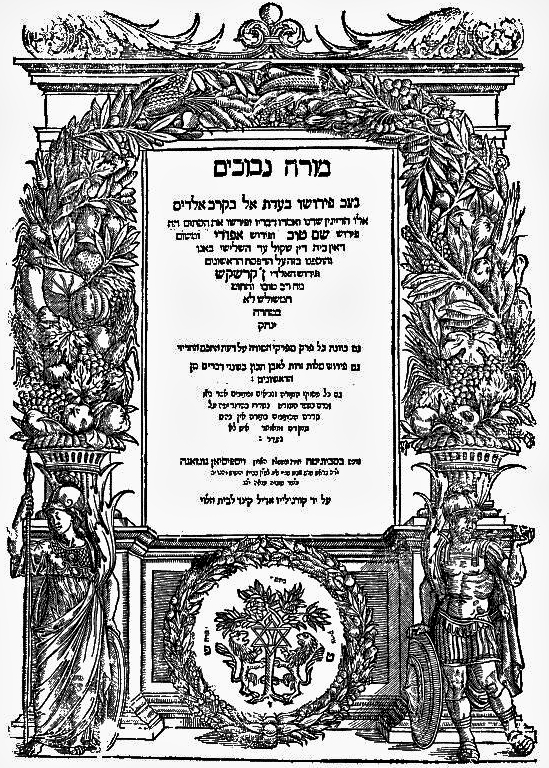
The title page of a Hebrew edition of the Guide for the Perplexed published in 1553. Hebrew translations introduced Judeo-Arabic philosophy to Jewish intellectual communities that did not use Arabic.

The preservation of the Cairo Geniza has had a major effect on modern scholarship. Colin Baker calls it “the most important manuscript source” for Judeo-Arabic, while The Cambridge History of Egypt describes medieval Egyptian Jewry as the Jewish community “best-known to modern historical scholarship” because so much documentation survives. Egypt and works that passed through Fustat are therefore more visible than communities whose books and documents did not survive in similar quantities.

The Geniza broadened the field beyond the study of famous theologians and philosophers to include ordinary social life. Princeton calls it a “snapshot of everyday life” whose letters, legal deeds and accounts are “fueling a new history of the global Middle Ages”. These documents have supported research into Mediterranean and Indian Ocean trade, marriage, labour, women's work, education, medicine, migration and the movement of books through Jewish, Muslim and Christian networks.

Judeo-Arabic also contributed to the medieval development of Hebrew as a language of philosophy, science and systematic prose. The translation of Arabic works into Hebrew “made possible the flowering of science and philosophy among Jews in Western Europe”. Judah ibn Tibbon, Samuel ibn Tibbon, Moses ibn Tibbon and Jacob Anatoli translated works by Saadia, Bahya, Halevi, Maimonides, Aristotle, Averroes, Avicenna and other Arabic writers.

The Ibn Tibbon family was “instrumental in creating a philosophical library in Hebrew” and developed “a technical terminology” later used by translators, philosophers and biblical commentators.

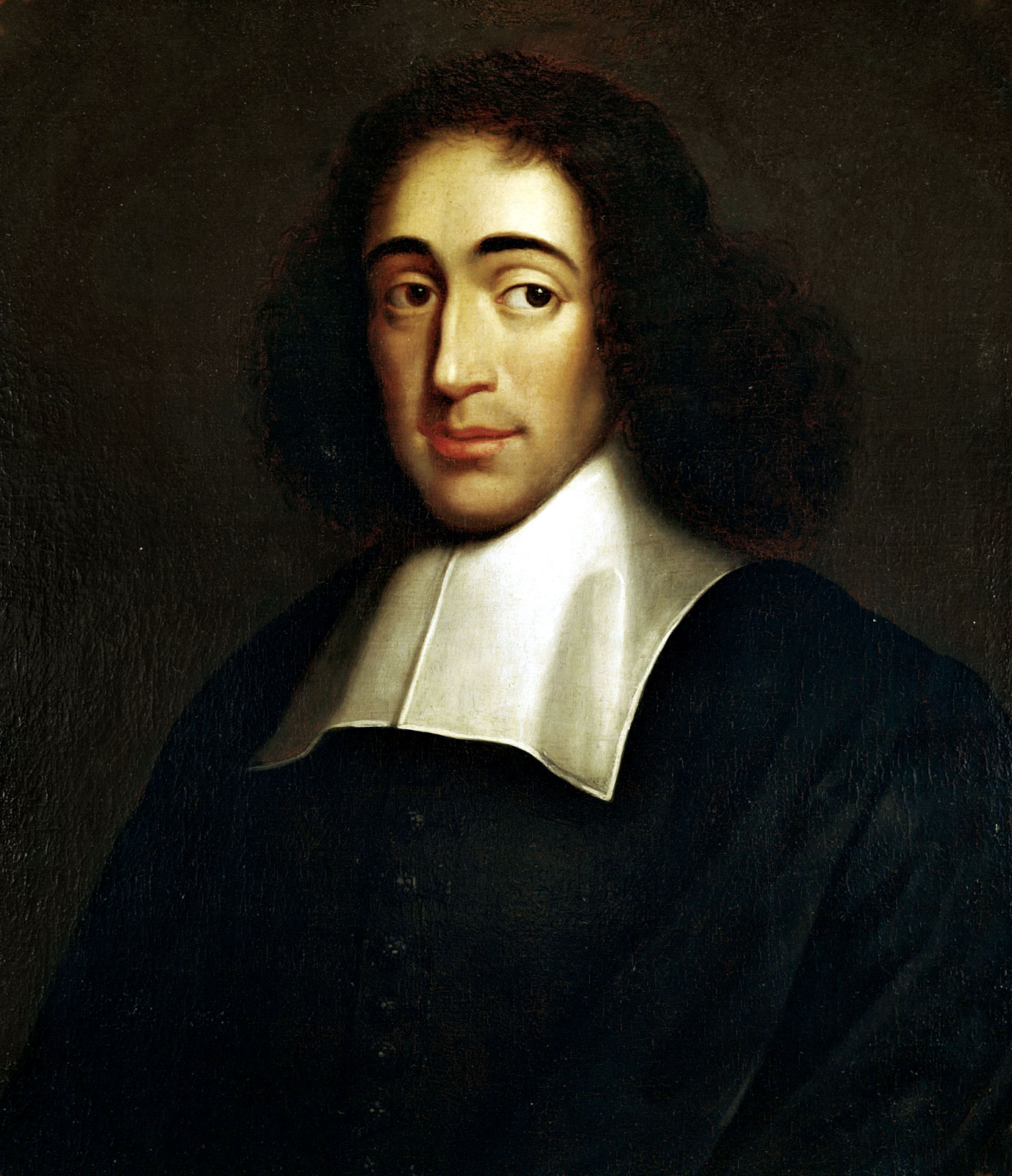
Baruch Spinoza, a philosopher descended from an Iberian Jewish family.

Their translations introduced or standardised Hebrew terms for logic, physics, metaphysics, mathematics and medicine. This vocabulary supported Maimonideanism, shaped exegesis in Provence, Italy, Byzantium and Spain, and formed part of the Maimonidean controversies of the thirteenth and fourteenth centuries. Through Hebrew translation, the influence of Judeo-Arabic also continued into early modern philosophy. Cambridge scholars state that “Maimonides’ influence on Spinoza was considerable”. Spinoza had Maimonides and the Guide for the Perplexed “squarely in focus” while developing his biblical interpretation in the Tractatus Theologico-Politicus. Although Spinoza often rejected Maimonides' conclusions, the Guide supplied questions and concepts about prophecy, scripture, anthropomorphism and divine purpose. De Souza argues that Maimonides' criticism of anthropocentrism “formatively influenced” Spinoza's attack on final causes in the appendix to Part I of the Ethics.

Hebrew translations also preserved parts of the Arabic philosophical tradition. Some commentaries by Averroes survive mainly or entirely in Hebrew or Latin. The Israel Academy notes that “almost no copies” of one commentary remained in Arabic, although Jewish scholars continued to study it and translated it twice into Hebrew.

== See also ==
- Judeo-Arabic
- Arabic literature
- Jewish literature
- Cairo Geniza
- Jewish philosophy
- Arab Jews
- Judeo-Iraqi Arabic
- Judeo-Moroccan Arabic
- Judeo-Yemeni Arabic
- Judeo-Tunisian Arabic
- Jewish poetry from al-Andalus
- Graeco-Arabic translation movement
