= Zion =

Synonym for Jerusalem or Israel

Coordinates: 31°46′18″N 35°13′45″E

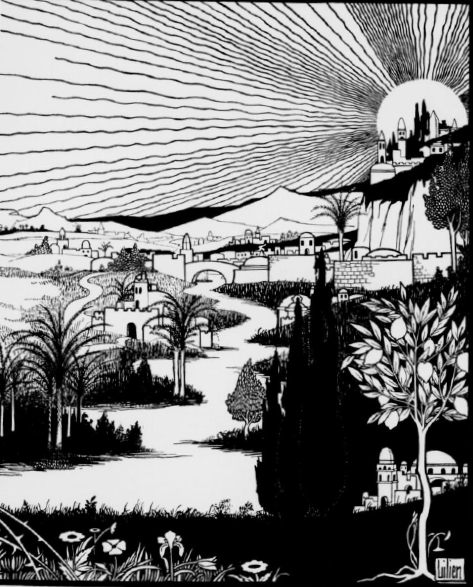
Zion (1903), Ephraim Moses Lilien

Zion (Hebrew: צִיּוֹן, romanized: Ṣiyyôn; (Note: Also variously transliterated Sion, Tzion, Tsion, Tsiyyon.) Biblical Greek: Σιών) is a placename in the Tanakh, often used as a synonym for Jerusalem as well as for the Land of Israel as a whole.

The name is found in 2 Samuel (2 Sam 5:7), one of the books of the Tanakh dated to approximately the mid-6th century BCE. It originally referred to a specific hill in Jerusalem, Mount Zion, located to the south of Mount Moriah (the Temple Mount). According to the narrative of 2 Samuel 5, Mount Zion held the Jebusite fortress of the same name that was conquered by David and was renamed the City of David. That specific hill ("mount") is one of the many squat hills that form Jerusalem.

The term Tzion came to designate the area of Davidic Jerusalem where the Jebusite fortress stood, and was used as well as synecdoche for the entire city of Jerusalem; and later, when Solomon's Temple was built on the adjacent Mount Moriah (which, as a result, came to be known as the Temple Mount), the meanings of the term Tzion were further extended by synecdoche to the additional meanings of the Temple itself, the hill upon which the Temple stood, the entire city of Jerusalem, the entire biblical Land of Israel, and "the World to Come", the Jewish understanding of the afterlife.

Over many centuries, until as recently as the 16th century (Ottoman period), the city walls of Jerusalem were rebuilt many times in new locations, so that the particular hill known in biblical times as Mount Zion is no longer within the city walls, but its location is now just outside the Old City and southeast of it. Most of the original City of David itself is thus also outside the current "Old City" wall. Adding to the confusion, another ridge, the Western Hill rather than the original Southeastern Hill (City of David) or the Southern Hill (Temple Mount), has been called 'Mount Zion' for the last two millennia.

== Etymology ==
The etymology of the word Zion (ṣiyyôn) is uncertain.

Mentioned in the Old Testament in the Books of Samuel (2 Samuel 5:7) as the name of a Jebusite fortress conquered by David, its origin seems to predate the Israelites. If Semitic, it may be derived from the Hebrew root ṣiyyôn ("castle") or the Hebrew צִיָּה ṣiyya ("dry land" or "desert", Jeremiah 51:43). A non-Semitic relationship to the Hurrian word šeya ("river" or "brook") has also been suggested as also one of Hittite origin.

The form ציון (Tzion, Tiberian transliteration: Ṣiyyôn) appears 108 times in the Tanakh, and once with article, as HaTzion.

Tsadi is usually rendered as z in English translations, hence the spelling Zion (rather than Tzion). This convention originates in German orthography, where z stands for the consonant /t͡s/.

== Judaism ==
=== Hebrew Bible: Zion, daughter(s) of Zion ===
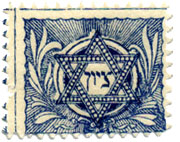
Ephraim Moses Lilien, Stamp for the Jewish National Fund, Vienna, 1901–2. The symbolic design presents a Star of David containing the word Zion in the Hebrew alphabet.

In the Hebrew Bible, Zion first appears as the stronghold captured by David from the Jebusites in the biblical narrative; in later poetic and prophetic texts, including Psalms and Isaiah, it became a designation for the whole Jerusalem, its inhabitants, the Temple, and, after the Babylonian destruction of Jerusalem in 586 BCE, the hope of restoration after exile.

Zion is mentioned 152 times in the Hebrew Bible (Tanakh), most often in the Prophetic books, the Book of Psalms, and the Book of Lamentations, besides six mentions in the Historical books (Kings, Samuel, Chronicles) and a single mention of the "daughters of Zion" in the Song of Songs (3:11)

Out of the 152 mentions, 26 instances are within the phrase of "Daughter of Zion" (Hebrew "bat Tzion"). This is a personification of the city of Jerusalem, or of its population.

In Psalm 137, Zion (Jerusalem) is remembered from the perspective of the Babylonian Captivity. "By the waters of Babylon, there we sat down and wept, when we remembered Zion. On the willows[a] there we hung up our lyres. For there our captors required of us songs, and our tormentors, mirth, saying, “Sing us one of the songs of Zion!”

Psalm 147 uses "Jerusalem" and "Zion" interchangeably to address the faithful: "The Lord builds up Jerusalem; He gathers the outcasts of Israel. He heals the brokenhearted and binds up their wounds. His delight is not in the strength of the horse, nor his pleasure in the legs of a man, but the Lord takes pleasure in those who fear him, in those who hope in his steadfast love. Praise the Lord, O Jerusalem! Praise your God, O Zion!"

=== Religious practice; exegesis ===
The location of the Temple, and in particular its Holy of Holies (innermost sanctum), is the most holy place in the world for the Jewish people, seen as the connection between God and humanity. Zion is frequently mentioned in Jewish prayer. Observant Jews recite the Amidah three times a day facing the Temple Mount in Jerusalem, praying for the rebuilding of the Holy Temple, the restoration of the Temple service, the redemption of the world, and for the coming of the Messiah.

In Joseph Gikatilla's medieval Kabbalistic work Sha'arei Orah, Mount Zion is interpreted as corresponding to Yesod, or "Foundation", one of the ten sefirot, and is described as the place from which the world was originally created. It is mystically located in the Holy of Holies of the First, Second and future Third Temple. According to Rabbi Abraham Joshua Heschel, "Zion is not a symbol, but a home, and the land is not an allegory but a possession."

When taking leave of a mourner, Ashkenazi Jews recite a traditional phrase that wishes comfort to a mourner with a reassurance that they will eventually reconnect to the person who died, in the same way that God comforts the Jewish people for the destruction of the Second Temple nearly 2,000 years ago through the promise of its eventual rebuilding in the times of the Messiah. The visitor says to the mourner:

הַמָּקוֹם יְנַחֵם אֶתְכֶם בְּתוֹךְ שְׁאָר אֲבֵלֵי צִיּוֹן וִירוּשָׁלָיִם
Hamakom y'nachem etkhem b'tokh sha'ar avelei tziyon viyrushalayim:
"May The Omnipresent comfort you (pl.) among the mourners of Zion and Jerusalem"

=== Jewish–Roman wars ===
The name "Zion" appears in the coins minted by the revolutionary government in Jerusalem during the Great Jewish Revolt against Rome (66–73 CE). Bronze coins from the revolt bear inscriptions such as 'freedom of Zion' (from years two and three) and 'for the redemption of Zion' (from year four). David Goodblatt argues that these slogans were used to communicate the rebels' goals to the masses, serving as a unifying rallying cry for the fight for Zion. James S. McLaren suggests that its appearance on the coins may specifically refer to the Temple Mount, as part of a set of terms conveying varying layers of identity: 'Jerusalem,' representing its location and the city's as the national capital, and 'Israel,' reflecting the new independent state. According to Ya'akov Meshorer, the name "Zion" was used on the coins as a 'poetic term' with nationalistic connotations, symbolizing not only Jerusalem but also "its history, religion, culture and desire for freedom".

=== Mourners of Zion ===
Beginning in the ninth century, a group of Karaite Jews calling themselves the "Mourners of Zion" (Avelei Tziyon) moved to Jerusalem in an effort to hasten the redemption of Israel. Influenced by the leadership of Daniel al-Kumisi, who issued an epistle calling for a mass return to Zion, they advocated for a physical presence in the Land of Israel as a religious duty. Once in Jerusalem, they adopted ascetic practices and produced influential religious texts, including biblical commentaries and legal treatises that formed the basis of early Karaite thought.

=== Medieval poetry: The Zionides ===
During the Middle Ages, the longing for Zion found its most famous literary expression in the "Zionides" (Hebrew: Shirei Tziyon). Among these was the poem "Zion, do you not ask" (Tzion halo tish'ali), written by the 12th-century Sephardic Jewish poet and philosopher Judah Halevi, and incorporated into the kinnot of Tisha B'Av. Halevi embarked on his own pilgrimage to the Land of Israel in 1140.

=== Zionism ===
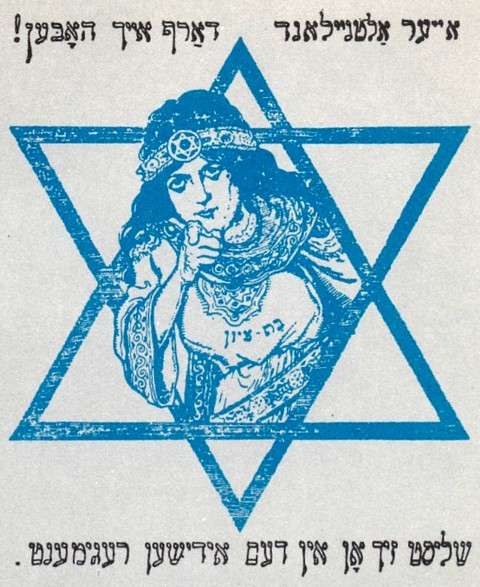
A World War I recruitment poster. The Daughter of Zion (representing the Hebrew people): "Your Old New Land must have you! Join the Jewish regiment."

Although modern "Zionism" emerged in nineteenth-century Europe, its name drew on the older Jewish religious and literary use of Zion as a term for Jerusalem, the Land of Israel, and restoration. The term "Zionism", coined by Austrian Jewish writer Nathan Birnbaum, was derived from the German rendering of Tzion in his journal Selbstemanzipation ("self emancipation") in 1890.

Zionism as a modern political movement started in 1897 (First Zionist Congress) and supported a "national home", and later a state in the Land of Israel as an expression of Jewish self-determination. The Zionist movement declared the establishment of the State of Israel in 1948, following the United Nations Partition Plan for Palestine. Since then, and with varying ideologies, Zionists have focused on developing and protecting this state.

Zionism is characterized by proponents as an indigenous national liberation movement. Critics often characterize it as a supremacist, colonialist, racist, and settler colonialist movement.

== Islamic tradition ==
Ṣahyūn (Arabic: صهيون, Ṣihyawn) is the word for Zion in Arabic and Syriac. Drawing on biblical tradition, it is one of the names accorded to Jerusalem in Arabic and Islamic tradition. A valley called Wādī Sahyũn seemingly preserves the name and is located approximately one and three-quarter miles from the Old City's Jaffa Gate.

For example, the reference to the "precious cornerstone" of the new Jerusalem in the Book of Isaiah 28:16 is identified in Islamic scholarship as the Black Stone of the Kaaba. This interpretation is said by ibn Qayyim al-Jawziyya (1292–1350) to have come from the People of the Book, though earlier Christian scholarship identifies the cornerstone with Jesus.

== Latter Day Saint ==
Within the Latter Day Saint movement, Zion is often used to connote a peaceful ideal society. In the Latter Day Saints belief system the term Zion is often used to denote a place of gathering for the saints. It is also often used to denote an area or city of refuge for the saints.

== Rastafari movement ==
I say fly away home to Zion, fly away home...One bright morning when my work is over, man will fly away home...

— Rastaman Chant, Bob Marley and the Wailers

In Rastafari, "Zion" stands for a utopian place of unity, peace and freedom, as opposed to "Babylon", the oppressing and exploiting system of the materialistic modern world and a place of evil.

It proclaims Zion, as reference to Ethiopia, the original birthplace of humankind, and from the beginning of the movement calls to repatriation to Zion, the Promised Land and Heaven on Earth. Some Rastafari believe themselves to represent the real Children of Israel in modern times, and their goal is to repatriate to Ethiopia, or to Zion. The Ge'ez-language Kebra Nagast serves as inspiration for the idea that the "Glory of Zion" transferred from Jerusalem to Ethiopia in the time of Solomon and Sheba, c. 950 BCE.

Rastafari reggae contains many references to Zion; among the best-known examples are the Bob Marley songs "Zion Train", "Iron Lion Zion", the Bunny Wailer song "Rastaman" ("The Rasta come from Zion, Rastaman a Lion!"), The Melodians song "Rivers of Babylon" (based on Psalm 137, where the captivity of Babylon is contrasted with the freedom in Zion), the Bad Brains song "Leaving Babylon", the Damian Marley song featuring Nas "Road to Zion", The Abyssinians' "Forward Unto Zion" and Kiddus I's "Graduation in Zion", which is featured in the 1977 cult roots rock reggae film Rockers, and "Let's Go to Zion" by Winston Francis. Reggae groups such as Steel Pulse and Cocoa Tea also have many references to Zion in their various songs.

The Jewish longing for Zion, starting with the deportation and enslavement of Jews during the Babylonian captivity, was adopted as a metaphor by Christian black slaves in the United States. Thus, Zion symbolizes a longing by wandering peoples for a safe homeland. This could be an actual place such as Ethiopia for Rastafari or Israel for the Jews. Rastafari, while not identifying as "Jews", identify themselves and Africa as Zion. Specifically, Ethiopia is acknowledged as the mountains of Zion. Further, Rastafari ontology views all Africans as God's Chosen People. This differs from Judaic narratives.

== Bahá’í Faith ==
References to Zion occur in the writings of the Bahá’í Faith. Bahá’u’lláh, the prophet-founder of the Bahá’í Faith wrote, concerning the Bahá’í Revelation,

The time foreordained unto the peoples and kindreds of the earth is now come. The promises of God, as recorded in the holy Scriptures, have all been fulfilled. Out of Zion hath gone forth the Law of God, and Jerusalem, and the hills and land thereof, are filled with the glory of His Revelation.

— Bahá’u’lláh, Gleanings from the Writings of Bahá’u’lláh

Call out to Zion, O Carmel, and announce the joyful tidings: He that was hidden from mortal eyes is come! His all-conquering sovereignty is manifest; His all-encompassing splendor is revealed.

— Bahá’u’lláh, Tablet of Carmel, Tablets of Baháʼu'lláh Revealed After the Kitáb-i-Aqdas

== Mount Zion ==
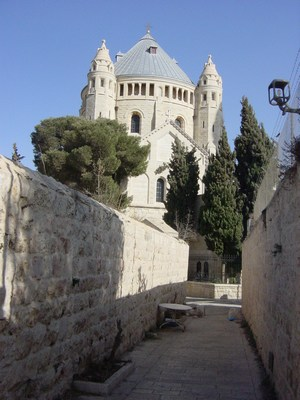
Abbey of the Dormition on the modern Mount Zion.

Today, Mount Zion refers to a hill south of the Old City's Armenian Quarter, not to the Temple Mount. This apparent misidentification dates at least from the 1st century AD, when Josephus calls Jerusalem's Western Hill "Mount Zion". The Abbey of the Dormition and King David's Tomb are located upon the hill currently called Mount Zion.

== See also ==
- Beulah (land)
- Book of Micah
- Jerusalem of Gold
- Names of Jerusalem
- New Jerusalem
- New world order (Baháʼí)
- Prisoners of Zion
- Mourners of Zion (Karaite Movement)

== Bibliography ==
- "Zion". The Church of Jesus Christ of Latter-day Saints.
- Alam, M. Shahid (November 9, 2009). Israeli Exceptionalism. New York, NY: Springer. ISBN 978-0-230-10137-1.
- Bareli, Avi (2003). "Forgetting Europe: Perspectives on the Debate about Zionism and Colonialism". Israeli Historical Revisionism: From Left to Right. Psychology Press.
- Beinart, Peter (January 28, 2025). Being Jewish After the Destruction of Gaza. New York: Random House. ISBN 978-0-593-80389-9.
- Curthoys, Ned; Ganguly, Debjani (2007). Edward Said: The Legacy of a Public Intellectual. Academic Monographs. ISBN 978-0-522-85357-5. Archived from the original on January 12, 2017.
- Gerson, Allan (1987). Dinstein, Yoram; Tabory, Mala (eds.). "The United Nations and Racism: The Case of the Zionism as Racism Resolution as Progenitor". Israel Yearbook on Human Rights. Vol. 17. The Faculty of Law, Tel Aviv University / Martinus Nijhoff Publishers / Kluwer Academic Publishers. ISBN 90-247-3646-3. ISSN 0333-5925. LCCN 72-955544. HeinOnline isryhr0017.
- Gould-Wartofsky, Michael (June 3, 2010). "Through the Looking Glass: The Myth of Israeli Exceptionalism". Huffington Post. Archived from the original on September 21, 2017.
- Hadawi, Sami (1991). Bitter harvest: a modern history of Palestine. Interlink Books.
- Jamal, Amal (2019). "Israel's New Constitutional Imagination: The Nation State Law and Beyond". Journal of Holy Land and Palestine Studies. 18 (2): 193–220. doi:10.3366/hlps.2019.0215. ISSN 2054-1988.
- Kayyali, Abdul Wahhab (1979). Zionism, imperialism, and race. Croom Helm.
- Kīfūrkiyān, Nādira Shalhūb (2009). Militarization and Violence Against Women in Conflict Zones in the Middle East: A Palestinian Case-Study. Cambridge University Press. ISBN 978-0-521-88222-4. Archived from the original on May 2, 2014.
- Ludlow, D. H. (Ed.) (1992). Vol 4. Encyclopedia of Mormonism. New York: Macmillan Publishing Company.
- McConkie, B. R. (1966). Mormon Doctrine. (2nd ed). Utah: Bookcraft.
- Masalha, Nur (2007). The Bible and Zionism: Invented Traditions, Archaeology and Post-Colonialism in Palestine–Israel. Zed Books. ISBN 978-1-84277-761-9. Archived from the original on January 12, 2017.
- Pappé, Ilan (2004). A History of Modern Palestine. Cambridge University Press. ISBN 978-0-521-55632-3.
- Pappé, Ilan (2006). The Ethnic Cleansing of Palestine. Oneworld Publications. ISBN 978-1-78074-056-0.
- Penslar, Derek J. (2003). "Zionism, Colonialism and Postcolonialism". Israeli Historical Revisionism: From Left to Right. Psychology Press.
- Prior, Michael (1997). The Bible and colonialism: a moral critique. Continuum International Publishing Group.
- Prior, Michael (1999). Zionism and the State of Israel: A Moral Inquiry. Psychology Press.
- Sabbagh-Khoury, Areej (2023). Colonizing Palestine: The Zionist Left and the Making of the Palestinian Nakba. Stanford University Press. ISBN 978-1-5036-3629-3.
- Scham, Paul; Salem, Walid; Pogrund, Benjamin (2005). Shared Histories: A Palestinian-Israeli Dialogue. Left Coast Press. ISBN 978-1-59874-013-4. Archived from the original on January 7, 2014.
- Shafir, Gershon (1999). "Zionism and Colonialism". In Pappé, Ilan (ed.). The Israel / Palestinian Question. Psychology Press. pp. 72–85.
- Shafir, Gershon; Peled, Yoav (2002). "The virtues of Ashkenazi pioneering". Being Israeli: The Dynamics of Multiple Citizenship. Cambridge Middle East Studies. Cambridge: Cambridge University Press. pp. 37–73. ISBN 978-0-521-79672-9.
- Steven Zarlengo: Daughter of Zion: Jerusalem's Past, Present, and Future. Dallas: Joseph Publishing, 2007.
- Zuriek, Elia (1979). The Palestinians in Israel: A Study in Internal Colonialism. Routledge & K. Paul.
