= David ibn Merwan al-Mukkamas =

10C Jewish philosopher & controversialist

David Abu Sulayman ibn Marwan al-Muqqamaṣ al-Raqqi (Arabic: داود إبن مروان المقمص translit.: Dawud ibn Marwan al-Muqammis; died c. 937) was a philosopher and controversialist, the author of an early Jewish philosophical work of the Middle Ages. He was a native of Raqqa, Mesopotamia, hence his laqab. Abraham Harkavy derives his nisba from the Arabic root qammaṣ "to leap," interpreting it as referring to his asserted change of faith. The name is written אלקומסי al-qumisi in Masudi's Al-Tanbih (ed. De Goeje, p. 113), in a Karaite Jewish commentary to Leviticus and a manuscript copy of Yefet ben Ali's commentary to the same book, and is perhaps a derivative from the city of Qumis, Iran. Another Karaite bears the name Daniel al-Kumisi, and in al-Hiti's chronicle, this name is also spelled with a tsade (Jew. Quart. Rev. ix.432).

== Polemical works ==
David, the father of Jewish philosophy, was almost unknown until the late 19th century. The publication of Judah ben Barzillai's commentary to the Sefer Yetzirah (Mekitze Nirdamim, 1885), in which is found a poor Hebrew translation of the ninth and tenth chapters of David's philosophical work, first brought the latter into notice. Barzilai says that he does not know whether David was one of the geonim but claims to have heard that Saadia Gaon had known him and had profited from his lessons.

Jacob Qirqisani reports that he converted to Christianity, and then back to Judaism.

== Twenty Chapters on Philosophy ==
In 1898, Harkavy discovered in the National Library of Russia fifteen of the twenty chapters of David's philosophical work entitled ʿIshrūn maqālāt "Twenty Treatises". The subject matter is as follows:

1. Aristotelian categories
2. Science and the reality of its existence
3. The creation of the world
4. The evidence that it is composed of substance and accidents
5. The properties of substance and accident
6. A criticism of those who maintain the eternity of matter
7. Arguments in favor of the existence of God and His creation of the world
8. The unity of God, refuting the Sabians, the Dualists, and the Christians
9. The divine attributes
10. Refutation of anthropomorphism and Christian ideas
11. Why God became our Lord
12. Showing that God created us for good and not for evil and combating absolute pessimism as well as absolute optimism
13. The utility of prophecy and prophets
14. Signs of true prophecy and true prophets
15. Mandatory and prohibitive commandments.

David, like other Karaites such as Joseph ben Abraham and Qiriqisani, were Mu'tazilites, which was especially visible in his chapter on the attributes of God, wherein he holds that, though we speak of these attributes as we speak of human attributes, the two can not be compared, since nothing comes to Him through the senses as is the case with man. God's "life" is a part of His "being," and the assumption of attributes in the Deity cannot affect His unity. "Quality" can not be posited of the Deity. In his tenth chapter, "Rewards and Punishments," David holds that these are eternal in the world to come. This chapter has many points in common with Saadia Gaon, drawing from the same source.

== Other works ==
David quotes two others of his works which are no longer in existence: Kitāb fī l-Budūd and Kitāb fī Arḍ al-Maqālāt ʿalà l-Manṭiq, on the categories. In one passage, David relates that he had a philosophical disputation in Damascus with a Muslim scholar, Shabib al-Baṣri. A fragment of another work, Kitab al-Tawḥīd "Book on the Unity (of God)," has been discovered among genizah fragments and has been published by Elkan Nathan Adler and Isaac Broydé in Jew. Quart Rev. (xiii.52 et seq.). David does not betray his Jewish origin in his philosophical work. Contrary to the practice of Saadia, Bahya ibn Paquda, and other Jewish philosophers, he never quotes the Bible, but cites Greek and Arab philosophers. It is possible that this accounts for the neglect of his work by the Jews.

== Jewish Encyclopedia bibliography ==
- Fürst, in Literaturblatt des Orients, viii.617, 642;
- Gabriel Polak, Halikot Ḳedem, pp. 69 et seq.;
- Pinsker, Liqquṭe Qadmoniyyot, ii.17 et seq.;
- Grätz, Gesch. v.285;
- A. Harkavy, Le-Qorot ha-Kittot be-Yisrael, in Grätz, Gesch. iii.498 et seq. (Hebr. transl.);
- idem, in Voskhod, Sept., 1898;
- Samuel Poznanski, in Jew. Quart. Rev. xiii.328;
- Steinschneider, in Jew. Quart. Rev. xi.606, xiii.450;
- idem, Hebr. Uebers. p. 378;
- David Kaufmann, Attributenlehre, Index, passim.

== Recent bibliography ==
- Sarah Stroumsa, Dawud ibn Marwan al-Muqammis's 'Ishrun Maqala (Etudes sur le judaisme medieval XIII, Leiden: Brill, 1989)
