= Mourners of Zion =

Mourners of Zion (Jewish Babylonian Aramaic: אְבֵילֵי צִיוֹן, romanized: əḇēlē ṣiyon) may refer to:

- Mourners of Zion (Karaite Movement), a Karaite Jewish ascetic movement established in Jerusalem during the 9th century, also known as the Community of Lilies (Shoshanim).
- A historical Yemeni Jewish group described by Benjamin of Tudela, who lived in caves, fasted during the week, and were referred to as Rechabites.
- "הַמָּקוֹם יְנַחֵם אֶתְכֶם בְּתוֹךְ שְׁאָר אֲבֵלֵי צִיּוֹן וִירוּשָׁלָיִם" ("May the Omnipresent comfort you among the remnant mourners of Zion and Jerusalem"), a traditional condolence phrase used in Jewish mourning rituals throughout the shiva period.

== See also ==
- Zion and Jerusalem in Jewish prayer and ritual
