= Forbidden relationships in Judaism =

Forbidden relationships in Judaism (איסורי ביאה Isurey bi'ah) are intimate relationships which are forbidden by prohibitions in the Torah or rabbinical injunctions.

Some of these prohibitions—those listed in Leviticus 18, known as arayot (Hebrew: עריות)—are considered such a serious transgression of Jewish law that one must give up one's life, rather than transgress one of them. (This does not necessarily apply to a rape victim.) This is as opposed to most other prohibitions, in which one is generally required to transgress the commandment when a life is on the line.

Some of these prohibitions (such as those related to homosexuality), while still observed by Orthodox Jews, are currently observed to a lesser extent or not at all by some of the non-Orthodox movements.

== Adultery ==
Adultery is prohibited by the seventh of the Ten Commandments (Exodus 20:12) which simply says:

Thou shalt not commit adultery.

It is forbidden for a man to have sexual relations with a married woman not his wife. (Leviticus 18:20, 20:10)

According to Jeffrey H. Tigay in Encyclopedia Judaica (2007), "ADULTERY (Heb. נִאוּף, ni'uf; sometimes, loosely, זְנוּת, zenut; זְנוּנִים, zenunim; lit. "fornication, whoredom"). Voluntary sexual intercourse between a married woman, or one engaged by payment of the brideprice, and a man other than her husband." Tigay stated the same idea in the Jewish Study Bible (2014).

Michael Coogan says that in the Hebrew Bible, there is no prohibition of premarital or extramarital sex for men, except for adultery, i.e. having sex with the wife of another man. A man's sexual history was never an issue (thus no such thing as a virginity requirement for men); there was no ban on men having sex with unmarried women (including prostitutes).

Danya Ruttenberg in The Oxford Handbook of Jewish Ethics and Morality agrees with Tigay and Coogan. She states that although considered undesirable, the Jewish religious authorities admitted the reality of premarital sexual relationships, and were somewhat ambivalent about such relationships. Sara N.S. Meirowitz agrees will Ruttenberg, Tigay and Coogan.

Howard Tzvi Adelman recognizes there was a double standard in judging fornication in the works of Medieval rabbis: an unmarried woman who engaged in premarital sexual relationships was guilty of fornication, but an unmarried man was not.

According to the Queer Bible Commentary (2015), the Hebrew Bible does not say that lesbianism would amount to zenut/adultery. Statements by other scholars make such claim plausible.

== Niddah ==
A man is not allowed to have sexual relations with a woman—including his wife—during and shortly after her menstrual period (Leviticus 18:19), until after she immerses in a mikveh. A woman who has experienced her menstrual period and has not gone to a proper mikveh is referred to as a niddah.

== Religious intermarriage ==
Religious intermarriage is forbidden in Orthodox and Conservative Judaism. There are differing opinions among the rabbis as to when the prohibition on sexual relations with non-Jews is from the Torah, and when it is rabbinic.

== Incest ==
=== Biblical prohibitions ===
Sexual relations with certain close relatives are forbidden in the Hebrew Bible. Though they are generally called incestuous relations, the biblical list does not necessarily correspond to those prohibited under state laws. In the Hebrew Bible, sexual relationships between siblings are forbidden to Jews but permissible to Gentiles (non-Jews).

The relationships forbidden by Leviticus 18 are:

- One's genetic relative (Leviticus 18:6)
- One's mother (Leviticus 18:7)
- One's father (Leviticus 18:7)
- One's stepmother (Leviticus 18:8)
- One's paternal or maternal sister (Leviticus 18:9)
- One's paternal sister through one's father's wife (Leviticus 18:11)
- One's daughter (inferred from Leviticus 18:10. Talmud Gittin 83a also implies that the prohibition on marrying one's daughter is a matter of Torah law)
- One's granddaughter (Leviticus 18:10)
- A woman and her daughter (Leviticus 18:17)
- A woman and her granddaughter (Leviticus 18:17)
- One's aunt by blood (Leviticus 18:12–13)
- One's father's brother (uncle) (Leviticus 18:14)
- One's father's brother's wife (aunt) (Leviticus 18:14)
- One's daughter-in-law (Leviticus 18:15)
- One's brother's wife (sister-in-law) (Leviticus 18:16), with the exception of Yibum
- One's wife's sister (sister-in-law) during one's wife's lifetime, even if since divorced (Leviticus 18:18)

=== Rabbinically prohibited relationships ===
In addition to the relationships biblically prohibited to Jews, rabbis have gone further to prohibit additional relationships with various blood relatives or in-laws. These are called "Shni'ot" (secondary prohibitions or seconds). Some of these are:

- One's grandmother
- One's brother
- One's great-grandmother
- One's grandfather's wife
- One's great-grandfather's wife
- One's grandson's wife

Adopted children who are raised together are not permitted to marry because of appearances, even if they are not biologically related.

== Exclusions from the assembly ==
The Bible excludes certain categories of people from taking part in the qahal (assembly) of HaShem. Jewish tradition considers this to be solely a limitation on marriage.

=== Biblical peoples ===
A Jew is prohibited from marrying a male Moabite and Ammonite convert (Deuteronomy 23:4); or an Egyptian or Edomite convert up to the third generation from conversion (Deuteronomy 23:8–9).

Nethinim/Gibeonites are prohibited by rabbinic injunction.

As the people currently living in those areas may not be descended from the original peoples, these prohibitions may not apply today.

=== Mamzer ===
A mamzer in Jewish law is a child resulting from an incestuous liaison or an adulterous liaison by a married woman. (This is not necessarily the same definition as a bastard by other societies, as it does not include a child of an unmarried woman.) As a mamzer is excluded from the assembly (Deuteronomy 23:3), the Talmud forbids a marriage by an ordinary Jew to a mamzer. However, a mamzer may marry a convert or another mamzer, though their child would also be considered a mamzer.

=== Certain eunuchs ===
Jewish tradition also forbids marriage to a man who has been forcibly emasculated; the Greek term spadon (σπάδων; Latin: spado) which is used to refer to such people, is used in the Septuagint to denote certain foreign political officials (resembling the meaning of eunuch). The Jewish prohibition does not include men who were born without visible testicles (conditions including cryptorchidism), or without a visible penis (intersex conditions can affect genital appearance). There is dispute, even in traditional Judaism, about whether this prohibited group of men should include those who have become, at some point since their birth, emasculated as the result of a disease.

== Special rules for priests ==
Israelite priests (kohanim) are not allowed to marry:

- divorcees
- converts
- a woman who has had certain forbidden sexual relationships (such as the zonah in the Torah) (Leviticus 21:7)
- a woman who was born of the prohibited relations of a kohen (called a chalalah) (Leviticus 21:7)
- women captured during warfare
- a widow whose brother-in-law refused to perform a levirate marriage, and she consequently performs the Halitzah ceremony

Some of these prohibitions are biblical, and some are rabbinical.

The Kohen Gadol (high priest) must also not marry a widow (Leviticus 21:14). He is required to marry a virgin maiden (Leviticus 21:13). However, if he was married to a woman otherwise permitted to a kohen, and was then elevated to the high priesthood, he may remain married to her.

== Homosexual acts ==
=== Orthodox view ===
Orthodox Judaism interprets (Leviticus 18:22) as forbidding homosexual acts between two men, and calls it an abomination. (Leviticus 18:14 specifically prohibits such relationships with one's father or uncle.)

There is no punishment prescribed in the Torah for sex acts between two women (lesbianism), but rabbinic law has prohibited it as an extension of the "activities of (ancient) Egypt" (see Leviticus 18:3). Although the practice is not considered adultery in the formal sense, the Talmud (Yevamot 76a), in the name of Rav Huna, suggests that women engaged in such practices are forbidden to marry a priest of Aaron's lineage. Others posit that such relationships do not prohibit the woman unto a kohen, since it is merely an act of lewdness. However, such practices are still censured and are said to be an infringement of the prohibition, "You shall not do as they do in the land of Egypt" (Leviticus 18:3).

=== Conservative view ===
Conservative Judaism's Committee on Jewish Law and Standards has validated different approaches to homosexual acts, with one opinion being like the Orthodox position in many respects, and another opinion permitting many forms of homosexual sex, while continuing to regard anal intercourse between men as prohibited.

According to Conservative rabbi and Bible scholar Jacob Milgrom, the Torah prohibits men lying with men in illicit ways, that are incestuous or adulterous, but otherwise homosexual relations are allowed.

In 2012, the American branch of Conservative Judaism represented by the Rabbinical Assembly devised a commitment ceremony for same-sex couples, though not defined as kiddushin. In 2014, the British group Masorti Judaism said it would support shutafut ceremonies for same-sex unions. In 2016, the Rabbinical Assembly passed a resolution supporting transgender rights.

=== Humanistic Judaism ===
In 2004, the Society for Humanistic Judaism issued a resolution supporting "the legal recognition of marriage and divorce between adults of the same sex", and affirming "the value of marriage between any two committed adults with the sense of obligations, responsibilities, and consequences thereof".

=== Reform view ===
Reform Judaism interprets Leviticus 18:22 as forbidding men from using sex as a form of ownership over men. Reform Jewish authors have revisited the Leviticus text, and ask why the text mentions that one should not lie with a man "as with a woman". If it is to be assumed that the Torah does not waste words, the authors ask why the Torah includes this extra clause. Most Reform Jews suggest that since intercourse involved possession (one of the ways in which a man "acquired" a wife was to have intercourse with her), similar to the Christian theology of using sex to "consummate" a marriage, it was abhorrent that a man might acquire another man—it is not the act of homosexual intercourse itself which is abhorrent, but using this act to acquire another man and therefore confuse the gender boundary.

== Bestiality ==
Men and women are forbidden from engaging in bestiality. (Leviticus 18:23) It is considered an abomination according to the Torah.

== Youth ==
The Sages taught that 18 is the ideal age to become married, and that before this age one should spend time studying scripture and getting their life in order. The Talmud prohibits for a person to betroth his daughter to a man when she is still a minor, until she is matured and can say "I want to marry so-and-so", because a minor is "incapable of forming an opinion".

However, in Shulchan Aruch it is explained that an exception is added when girls ages 3 through 12 might be given to betrothal by their fathers under distressing situations of exile and persecution, but should be avoided when possible. Nevertheless, it prohibited betrothal by intercourse, with the punishment being rabbinically decreed whiplashes, and emphasizes that both betrothal and marriage to minors is forbidden by rabbinic decree. Shulchan Aruch also states that the "deaf-mute", "insane", and "minors" are not fit agents for betrothal "because they are lacking in mental capacity", as such they cannot meaningfully consent.

Moreover, The Sages in the Talmud strongly opposed a wide age gap between spouses in either direction (e.g., between a young man and an old woman, and vice versa), especially in the case of marrying off one's young daughter to an old man, which they declared as reprehensible as forcing her into prostitution. Sanhedrin interpreted that Leviticus 19:29 forbids marrying off one's daughter to an old man because it might lead her to engage in adultery, and the father is fully responsible for causing that situation.

The Talmud also teaches that "those who marry minor girls who are not yet capable of bearing children" will "delay the coming of the messiah." In Avot de-Rabbi Nathan, Rashbi equates child marriage to murder. Also noteworthy is the teaching of the Talmud and Rambam that if a woman refuses intimacy because she is repulsed by her husband then "her husband should be compelled to divorce her immediately. For she is not like a captive, [to be forced] to engage in relations with one she loathes."

== See also ==
- Judaism and sexuality
