= Jacob Qirqisani =

10th-century Karaite dogmatist and exegete

Jacob Qirqisani (c. 890 – c. 960) (Arabic: أبو یوسف یعقوب القرقساني ʾAbū Yūsuf Yaʿqūb al-Qirqisānī, Hebrew: יעקב בן יצחק הקרקסאני Yaʿaqov ben Yiṣḥaq haQarqesani) was a Karaite dogmatist and exegete who flourished in the first half of the tenth century. His origins are unknown. His patronym "Isaac" and teknonym "Joseph" reflect no more than the genealogy of the biblical patriarchs (see Kunya), while his surname has been taken as referring to either ancient Circesium in eastern Syria, or Karkasān, near Baghdad, though no Karaite community is known in either place, or as "the Circassian". He seems to have traveled throughout the Middle East, visiting the centers of Islamic learning, in which he was well-versed.

In 937 Qirqisani wrote an Arabic work on the Jewish precepts—under the title Kitāb al-Anwār wal-Marāqib (کتاب الأنوار والمراقب, known in Hebrew as Sefer ha-Me'orot, or Sefer ha-Ma'or), with the subtitle Kitab al-Shara'i (Sefer Mitzvot Gadol)—and a commentary entitled al-Riyad wal-Hada'iq (Sefer ha-Gannim we-Pardesim, or Sefer ha-Nitztzanim), on those portions of the Torah which do not deal with the laws.

== Kitab al-Anwar ==
The first volume of Qirqisani's Kitāb al-Anwār wal-marrāqib is the most important, which not only provides valuable information concerning the development of Karaism but throws light also on many questions in Rabbinic Judaism. It comprises thirteen treatises, each divided into chapters, and the first four treatises form an introduction to the whole work. In the first treatise, of eighteen chapters, Qirqisani gives a comprehensive survey of the development of Jewish religious movements, the material for which he drew not only from the works of his predecessors, as David ibn Merwan al-Mukkamas, whom he mentions, but also from his personal experiences in the learned circles in which he moved. The enumeration of the sects is given in chronological order, beginning with the Samaritans, and concluding with the sect founded by Daniel al-Kumisi.

Qirqisani declares the Rabbinites to be a Jewish sect founded by Jeroboam although it did not make its appearance until the time of the Second Temple. In opposition to them, Zadok, a disciple of Antigonus of Sokho and founder of a sect (either the Sadducees or Essenes) revealed part of the truth on religious subjects, while Anan ben David disclosed the whole. However, despite Qirqisani's admiration for Anan, he often disagrees with him with his explanation of the precepts.

Considered a heresiography, although not a work primarily of history per se, it utilizes historiographical narrative for sectarian purposes to discredit Rabbinic Judaism by tying it to the story of Jeroboam.

== View of Christianity ==
Qirqisani includes Christianity among the Jewish sects. In the third treatise (ch. xvi.) he says that "the religion of the Christians, as practised at present, has nothing in common with the teachings of Jesus." According to Qirqisani, the Christianity of his day originated with Paul the Apostle, who ascribed divinity to Jesus and prophetic inspiration to himself. It was Paul that denied the necessity of carrying out the 613 commandments and taught that religion consisted in humility; and the First Council of Nicaea adopted precepts which do not occur in the Law, Gospels, or Acts of the Apostles.

== Philosophy and theology ==
Qirqisani devotes a great portion of the first treatise to attacks upon Rabbinic Judaism. In the last chapter, he also draws a sad picture of the spiritual condition of Karaism in his time. "You can scarcely find two Karaites of one and the same opinion on all matters; upon almost any point each has an opinion different from those of all the rest." He deplores the neglect by the Karaites of the study of rabbinical literature, which, according to him, would furnish them with weapons for their controversies with the Rabbanites. Here, Qirqisani is referring to the discrepancies frequent in haggadic and hekhalot literature such as the Shi'ur Qomah, which, indeed, he often uses in his attacks against the Rabbanites.

The second treatise, of twenty-eight chapters, discusses the duty of applying critical methods to study religious matters. Qirqisani is the first Karaite known to have firmly believed in the study of the sciences. He criticizes those who, although accepting the fundamental principle of independent inquiry and research, are against the demonstrative sciences of dialectics and philosophy. Reason is the foundation upon which every article of faith is based and all knowledge flows.

The third treatise, of twenty-three chapters, is a critical review of adverse religious sects and Christianity. In the seventeenth and eighteenth chapters, Qirqisani refutes the doctrine of gilgul (metempsychosis), though among its exponents was Anan ben David, who wrote a work on the subject. For Qirqisani, the solution to the question much debated by the Muʿtazili mutakallimūn concerning the punishments inflicted upon children is not to be found in transmigration but in the belief that compensation will be given to children in the future world for their sufferings in this.

In the fourth treatise, Qirqisani expounds, in sixty-eight chapters, the fundamental principles leading to the comprehension of the particular religious prescriptions. The remaining treatises are devoted to the precepts, arranged in systematic order. Qirqisani quotes the views of the earliest Karaite authorities such as Anan ben David, Benjamin Nahawandi, and Daniel al-Qumisi, which he often refutes. Belonging to the Ba'ale haRikkub or Karaite expounders of the Law, he is particularly severe in his views on the laws of incest. He combats the opinion of his contemporary Rabbanite Jacob ben Ephraim al-Shami, who permitted marriage to the daughter of one's brother or sister.

Qirisani claims that natural knowledge and Greek philosophy originated with Solomon.

== Extant manuscripts ==
Most of the Kitab al-Anwar and the beginning of the Al-Riyad wal-Hada'iq are still extant in manuscript, in the Abraham Firkovich collection in the National Library of Russia (Nos. 1142-1444). The first treatise of the Kitab al-Anwar, dealing with the Jewish sects, was published by Abraham Harkavy in the memoirs of the Oriental section of the Archeological Society (viii. 1849). Various fragments of seven treatises (ii.-vi., viii., ix.-xii.) are found in the British Museum (Oriental MSS. Nos. 2,524, 2,526, 2,578-2,582). They were analyzed by Samuel Abraham Poznański, who published the text of chapters xvii. and xviii. of the third treatise, dealing with the doctrine of metempsychosis, and chapter xxxv. of the fifth treatise, in which Qirqisani discusses the question whether it is permitted to read on Shabbat books written in other than the Hebrew alphabet (Kohut Memorial Volume, pp. 435–462; Steinschneider Festschrift, pp. 195 et seq.).

The text of the sixteenth chapter of the third treatise, dealing with the criticism of Christianity, was published by Hartwig Hirschfeld in his chrestomathy (Arabic Chrestomathy in Hebrew Characters (1892)). A dissertation on the Ten Commandments by Qirqisani, which Steinschneider supposes to be the first chapter of the sixth treatise beginning with proofs of the existence of God, is found in the Bibliothèque Nationale (No. 755).

Both the Kitab al-Anwar and the Al-Riyad wal-Hada'iq were abridged, the former by a certain Moses ben Solomon haLevi. Harkavy deduces from quotations that Qirqisani translated the Bible into Arabic, wrote commentaries on the Book of Job and on Ecclesiastes, and wrote a work on the tawhid "unity of God", Kitab al-Tawhid.
