= David ben Solomon Altaras =

Italian rabbi and editor

David ben Solomon Altaras (Hebrew: דוד בן שלומה אלטאראס) was an Italian rabbi and editor who flourished at Venice, 1675–1714. He wrote the short Hebrew grammar in the quarto Bible (Venice, 1675–78). He edited a daily prayer-book (Venice, 1696) and a vocalized edition of the Mishnah with short notes (Venice, 1756–60). His will is printed under the title Sefer Tsuf Devash (Venice, 1714).

== See also ==
- Altaras family
