= Meir ibn Aldabi =

Meir ibn Aldabi (Hebrew: מאיר אבן אלדבי) was a 14th-century Jewish writer. He was the son of Isaac Aldabi, grandson of Asher ben Jehiel, and a descendant of the exiles from Jerusalem. His name (erroneously spelled Albadi, Albalidi, Alrabi, and Altabi) is ascertained from his chief work, Shebile Emunah, wherein a poem is found in which every line begins with a letter of his name, and there it reads "Aldabi."

== Biography ==
In the preface to his book occurs the expression, "of the exiles of Jerusalem." This, together with Aldabi's statement that he was exiled from his country (Andalusia), caused Graetz to assume that Meir ibn Aldabi was banished to Jerusalem. Graetz failed to take into account Aldabi's words, "He [God] led me into a waste land," which he would not have used in reference to Jerusalem.

Aldabi belonged to the class of popular writers who, possessing extensive theological and scientific knowledge, commented upon the assertions of their predecessors with a clear understanding, expressing here and there their own opinions, and presenting some subjects from the standpoint of the Kabbala. Aldabi was also one of those Talmudists whose conception of religion was wholly spiritual and who revered the Cabala: he can not, however, be called a true cabalist. In 1360 he wrote Shebile Emunah (The Paths of Faith), an exhaustive treatise on philosophical, scientific, and theological subjects. To judge from the many editions that appeared from time to time, it was for centuries a favorite book with the educated.

== Shebile Emunah ==
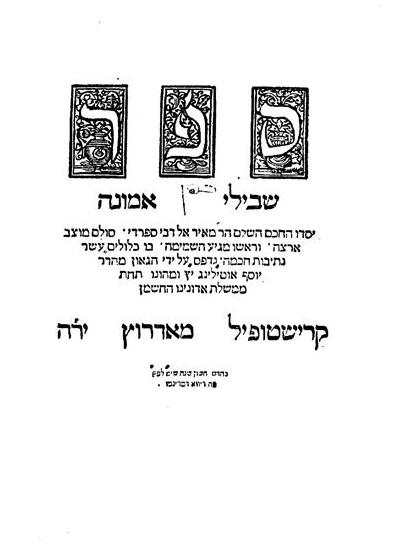
Shvilei Emunah

Shevilei Emunah was completed in 1360. It is divided into ten chapters, which treat respectively of:

1. The existence of God, His attributes, His immateriality, unity, and immutability, which is not affected by prayer or even by miracles – introducing in each case a cabalistic discussion of the names of the Deity.
2. The creation of the world, which does not necessitate any change in God or any plurality in His nature; an explanation of the Biblical account being given, followed by a dissertation on the seven climates or zones of the earth as then conceived, the spheres, the stars, the sun and moon and their eclipses, and on meteorology.
3. Human embryology and the generative functions.
4. Human anatomy, physiology, and pathology.
5. Rules for health and long life.
6. The soul and its functions.
7. The exaltation of the soul, which, through the fulfilment of the Law, becomes one with the Creator – the chapter being devoted chiefly to an explanation of the ethical value of the Mosaic commandments.
8. Explanatory notes on the truth of the Law and of oral tradition, elucidating some of the Haggadot on the same lines as Solomon ben Adret.
9. Reward and punishment, paradise and hell, immortality of the soul and its transmigration in man.
10. The redemption of Israel, the resurrection, and the world to come after resurrection; a general résumé of the book, followed by a poem.

Steinschneider (Hebr. Uebers. pp. 9–27) has shown Aldabi's Shebile Emunah to be a compilation from various older sources, chiefly from Gerson ben Solomon of Arles's encyclopedic work, Sha'ar ha-Shamayim, of the 13th century. From Gerson's work the chapter on the members of the human body (§2, chap. iii) is taken, and in part verbally. So are Aldabi's "Ten Questions on the Soul" (§6), interspersed with passages borrowed literally from Joseph ibn Zaddik and Hillel ben Samuel, only a modified form of the "Ten Discussions on the Soul," which Gerson himself adapted from a book on the soul, probably written by Ibn Gabirol. Against the charges of plagiarism raised in Brüll's Jahrb. ii.166-168, see Steinschneider, Hebr. Bibl. 1876, p. 90.

Aldabi criticizes those who study Greek philosophy, arguing for a Jewish origin of secular philosophy and science, and that the Greeks amalgamated and introduced errors into what they ultimately learned from Jewish figures such as King Yekhanya and members of the Sanhedrin exiled from Judea. Aldabi also claims that Aristotle obtained and copied Solomon's works, introducing changes and errors.

== Jewish Encyclopedia bibliography ==
- Moritz Steinschneider, Cat. Bodl. col. 1690;
- Heinrich Grätz, Gesch. d. Juden, vii.328;
- Gustav Karpeles, Gesch. d. Jüd. Lit. p. 764;
- Isaac Benjacob, Oẓar ha-Sefarim, p. 265.
- Many extracts from the Shebile Emunah may be found in Kaufmann, Die Sinne, see index.
