= Sidi ibn Ibrahim al-Taras =

Sidi ibn Ibrahim ibn Hasdai al-Tarās (Judeo-Arabic: סידי בן אברהם בן חסדאי אלתראס, Arabic: سيدي بن ابراهيم بن حدادي التاراس), also known as Sidi ibn al-Tarās, was an 11th-century Sephardic Karaite scholar.

Born to the al-Tarās family in Kingdom of Castile around 1065. Several sources written by Joseph ben Tzaddik and Abraham ibn Daud state that in his early years, al-Taras became a disciple of the Karaite scholar Jeshua ben Judah. He eventually returned to the Iberian Peninsula, settling in al-Andalus, where he attempted to gain Karaite followers amongst the Rabbanites. This made al-Taras a highly controversial figure, leading to the expulsion of the Karaites in Castile by Alfonso VI, who was pressured by local Rabbinite communities to do so.
