= Mizrachi =

Mizrachi or Mizrahi (Hebrew: מזרחי, romanized: mizrakhí, lit. 'Middle Eastern, eastern') has two meanings.

In the literal Hebrew meaning eastern, it may refer to:

- Mizrahi Jews, Jews from the Middle East and North Africa
- Mizrahi (surname), a Sephardic surname, given to Jews who got to the Iberian Peninsula from the east, or Jews who lived on the eastern side of the peninsula
- Mizrahi Hebrew, a blanket term for dialects of Mizrahi Jews
- Mizrahi music, an Israeli musical genre

Mizrachi (מִזְרָחִי) may also be a notarikon (Hebrew abbreviation) of מרכז רוחני, merkaz ruhani – "spiritual centre", introduced by rabbi Samuel Mohilever. In this meaning it may refer to:

- Bank Mizrahi, a precursor of Bank Mizrahi-Tefahot, Israel
- Mizrachi (religious Zionism), a religious Zionist movement
- Mizrachi (political party) and Hapoel HaMizrachi, defunct Israeli political parties
- Zionist Organization Mizrachi, Latvia
