= Daniel al-Kumisi =

Karaite rabbi (died 946)

Daniel al-Kumisi (Arabic: دانيال ابن موسى القومسي; ? in Damagan, Tabaristan – 946, in Jerusalem) was one of the most prominent early scholars of Karaite Judaism. He flourished at the end of the ninth or the beginning of the tenth century. He was a native of Damagan, capital of the province of Qumis in the former state of Tabaristan (now in Semnan province of Iran), as is shown by his two surnames, the latter of which is found only in Jacob Qirqisani's works.

Al-Kumisi's attitude to Anan ben David and his violent opposition to the Ananites (i.e., the first Karaites, Anan's followers and immediate successors) are characteristic of his place in Karaism. At first, he esteemed Anan highly, calling him rosh hamaskilim "chief of the scholars". However, he later despised him and called him rosh hakesilim "chief of the fools". Nevertheless, Daniel's opinions were respected by the Karaites.

Daniel later immigrated to Jerusalem, and founded the order of the "Mourners of Zion." He may have built the oldest Karaite synagogue, which is located in Jerusalem. Espousing proto-Zionist views, he urged his fellow Karaites to return to Israel, and called those who opposed doing so "fools who draw the Lord's wrath" in his Epistle to the Diaspora.

As regards Daniel's theories, he denied that speculation could be regarded as a source of knowledge, and, probably following this tenet, he maintained, in opposition to Anan, the principle that the Biblical laws must not be interpreted allegorically nor explained contrary to the simple text (see below). He evinces little regard for science; for instance, he asserted it is forbidden to determine the new moon by calculation after the manner of the Rabbanites because such calculations are condemned like astrology. This practise is threatened with severe punishment in Isaiah 47, 13–14. Nonetheless, Daniel in his commentary to Leviticus 26, indulges in long reflections on the theodicy and the suffering of the pious. His conception of the angels, also, is most extraordinary. He says that wherever mal'akhim "angels" are mentioned in the Bible, the designation does not refer to living, speaking beings who act as messengers, but to forces of nature, as fire, fog, winds, etc. through which God performs His works (compare Maimonides, "Moreh," ii. 6). This may be due to the influence of the Sadducees, who also denied the existence of angels; compare Acts of the Apostles 23, 8, as in works circulated among the earlier Karaites named after Zadok and containing Sadducee opinions.

== Legal Decisions ==
Daniel favored a rigorous interpretation of the Torah. The following decisions of his have been preserved: It is forbidden to do any work whatever on Shabbat—even to clean the hands with powder—or to have any work done on the Sabbath by a non-Jew, whether gratuitously, or for wages or any other compensation. The burning of lights is forbidden not only on Friday evenings, but also on the evenings of the festivals. In the description in Lev. xxiii. 40 of the trees which, according to Daniel, were used in erecting the sukkah, the phrase "periez hadar" (the fruit of goodly trees) is more definitely explained by "kappot temarim" (branches of palms), the palm being distinguished for its beauty (Cant. vii. 8).

Like Anan, Benjamin Nahawandi and Ismāʿīl al-ʿUkbarī, Daniel forbade eating animals used for sacrifice in the Temple of Jerusalem in the Diaspora, adding to the proofs of his predecessors others drawn from Hosea 9, 4 and Isa. lxvi. 3. The prohibition contained in Exodus 23, 19 ("You shall not boil a kid in its mother’s milk") must not be interpreted allegorically, as Anan interpreted it, but literally. The priest carried out the injunction to "pinch off its head" of the bird (Book of Leviticus 1, 15: Hebrew: מָלַק֙, romanized: mālaq) by cutting the head off entirely, after the slaughtering. The clean birds are not recognizable by certain signs, as Rabbanites assert, but the names of the birds as found in the Torah are decisive; since these can not always be identified, Karaites made the class of forbidden birds very large.

Among locusts, only the four species expressly named in Lev. xi. 22 are permitted as food. It is forbidden to eat eggs because they must be considered as living things that can not be slaughtered according to the Book of Deuteronomy 22, 6–7, where it is permitted to take the young but not the eggs. Of fish, only the eggs are permitted; blood is forbidden.

The leper must still be considered unclean; this was directed against Anan, who had held that the laws regarding the clean and the unclean were not applicable in the Diaspora. The carcass of an animal, however, ceases to be unclean after use has been made of it in any way, as is proved by Leviticus 7, 24.

== Influence of Islam and Talmud ==
Concerning levirate marriage, Daniel agrees with Anan that "ahim" in Deuteronomy 25, 5 does not mean "brothers", which would violate the prohibition contained in Lev. xviii. 16, but "relations." The story of Judah and his sons (Genesis 38, 8) proves nothing, because at that time the prohibition against marrying a brother's wife did not exist. The prohibition contained in Lev. 18, 18 can not be taken literally as the Rabbanites do, for the wife's sister is forbidden under any circumstance, just as is the husband's brother (there is here an example of the method of analogy, "heqqesh"); it is rather the stepsister of the wife that is meant in the passage in question, e.g., the daughter of the father-in-law's wife whom the last named had by her first husband. In this case, the prohibition ends with the wife's death.

The daughter is not excluded from the heritage, as the Rabbanites say, although her portion is less than that of the son, being only one-third; for in the law of valuation in connection with vows (Leviticus 27), women were valued less than men. In conformity with this law, the mother also receives one-third. Daniel was possibly influenced here by Muslim fiqh; cf. Quran, an-Nisa 12.

In other respects, Daniel follows the Talmud in holding that the descendants of one entitled to a portion succeed to his entire rights; the children of the son—i.e., grandchildren—taking precedence over the daughter, their aunt. Finally, Daniel holds that responsibility for the observance of the commandments must begin not with the thirteenth, but with the twentieth year; that Rosh Hashanah begins on Yom Kippur on the tenth of Tishri, as follows from Ezek. 40 1, " at the beginning of the year, the tenth day of the month"; and that Muslims also may act as witnesses of the new moon's appearance.

Daniel wrote several works in the Hebrew language, all of which, save for a few quotations and fragments, have been lost. There is undeniable evidence that he compiled a legal code (Sefer ha-Mitzvot or "Book of Commandments"), and a work on the rights of inheritance. The latter, against which Saadia Gaon directed his polemics, was perhaps merely a part of the code just mentioned. He also wrote commentaries to the Torah, Joshua, and the Book of Judges, and probably to other Biblical books. They were not running commentaries, but explanations to certain passages, and contained also digressions. Words were often explained in Arabic. These commentaries, especially that of the Torah, probably contained many of the decisions enumerated above.

== Resources ==
- Kohler, Kaufmann and Samuel Poznansky. "Daniel ben Moses al-Ḳumisi". Jewish Encyclopedia. Funk and Wagnalls, 1901–1906; which contains the following bibliography:
  - The principal source regarding Daniel and his opinions is Ḳirḳisani, sec. i., ch. i.-ii. xviii. (ed. Harkavy, p. 280, lines 8-19; 285, 19–20; 316, 14-29); sec. iii., ch. xxi.-xxiii., sec. xi., ch. xxvi.; sec. xii., ch. vii., xxxiii. (MSS. Br. Mus. Or. 2524, fols. 63–68; 2578, fols. 10-15 and 143–144;
  - compare Steinschneider Festschrift, pp. 199 et seq.). For the other opinions of Daniel: Hadassi, **Eshkol, 126נ, 233נ, 236ח, 240ר, 256נ, 287נ, 308ע, 316ה;
  - Aaron ben Elijah, Gan 'Eden, 65b, below, and 169d, below;
  - Bashyaẓi, Aderet, ch. ii., iii. Extracts from the, after quotations from Karaitic authors, are found in: Pinsker, Liḳḳuṭe Ḳadmoniyyot, ii. 188;
  - Abraham Harkavy, in Berliner's Magazin, xx. 228;
  - Samuel Poznanski, in Jew. Quart. Rev. viii. 683. A fragment of the commentary to Lev. i. 1-15, vi. 21-vii. 21, from the Cairo Genizah, has been published by Schechter, Saadyana, pp. 144–146 (Jew. Quart. Rev. xiv. 512; compare ib. 41,79);
  - another fragment, to Lev. xxv. 9-xxvi. 25, has been edited by Harkavy, in Fuchs', i. 169–173, who ascribes it to Benjamin al-Nahawandi. Daniel, however, is the author, compare Harkavy, Studien u. **Mittheil. viii. 192, and note 2; 187.
  - Compare also Pinsker, l.c. i. 45;
  - Fürst, Geschichte des Karäerthums, i. 78;
  - Gottlober, p. 164;
  - Harkavy, Ḳirḳisani, p. 271;
  - Poznanski in Jew. Quart. Rev. viii. 681 et seq.;
  - Margoliouth, ib. ix. 436, note 2.
