= Jewish views on incest =

Jewish views on incest deal with the sexual relationships which are prohibited by Judaism and rabbinic authorities on account of a close family relationship that exists between persons. Such prohibited relationships are commonly referred to as incest or incestuous, though that term does not appear in the biblical and rabbinic sources. The term mostly used by rabbinic sources is "forbidden relationships in Judaism".

== Relationships forbidden in the Hebrew Bible ==
The Hebrew Bible sets out several lists of relationships sexual relations between which are forbidden. Two lists appear in the Book of Leviticus and one list appears in the Book of Deuteronomy. The lists mention relationships with female relatives only; excluding lesbianism, this implies that the list is addressed to men. In the Hebrew Bible, sexual relationships between siblings are forbidden to Jews but permissible to Gentiles (non-Jews). Since the lists would then describe women with whom it is forbidden for a man to have a relationship, they also indirectly imply a list of men with whom it is forbidden for a woman to have a relationship.

The lists are as follows:

Forbidden for men only
Forbidden for women only
Forbidden for men and women

(The table below displays no color blocks when viewed in the Wikipedia app, and must be viewed in a web browser for accuracy.)

			Holiness Code		Deuteronomic Code
			Leviticus 18	Leviticus 20	Deuteronomic Code
Grandparent's spouse (including other grandparent)					
Parent's spouse		Parent			
Parent's spouse		Stepparent			
Parent-in-law					
Uncle/aunt	Parent's sibling				
Uncle/aunt	Uncle's/aunt's spouse	Father's sibling's spouse			
Uncle/aunt	Uncle's/aunt's spouse	Mother's sibling's spouse			
Parent's child	Half-Sibling (mother's side)				
Parent's child	Father's child	Sibling			
Parent's child	Father's child	Half-sibling (father's side)			
Step sibling					
Sibling-in-law (if the spouse was still alive)					
Nephew/niece	Sibling's child				
Nephew/niece	Nephew/niece-in-law	Spouse's brother's child			
Nephew/niece	Nephew/niece-in-law	Spouse's sister's child			
Spouse's child		Child			
Spouse's child		Stepchild			
Child-in-law					
Spouse's grandchild (including grandchild)					

One of the most notable features of each list is that sexual relations between a man and his own daughter are not explicitly forbidden, although the first relation mentioned after the Levitical prohibition of sex with "near kin" is that of "thy father". (This assumes that the Torah is speaking to men only. If it is speaking to everyone, then a woman is not allowed to have sex with her father. It also explicitly prohibits having sex with a woman and her daughter. A man's daughter is obviously also the daughter of a woman with whom he had sexual relations.) The Talmud argues that this absence is because the prohibition was obvious, especially given the proscription against a relationship with a granddaughter. As with the case of a man's own daughter, the shortness of the list in Leviticus 20, and especially of that in Deuteronomy, are explained by classical Jewish scholarship as being due to the obviousness of the missing prohibitions.

Apart from the case of a man marrying his daughter, the list in Leviticus 18 roughly produces the same rules as were followed in early (pre-Islamic) Arabic culture. However, most tribal nations also disliked exogamous marriage – marriage to completely unrelated people.

Judaism's view is that before the giving of the Torah at Mount Sinai, some of the prohibitions applied voluntarily only. Thus in several prominent cases in the Torah, the incest rules are ignored in favour of marriage to a close relative; Jacob is described as having married his first wife's sister.

=== Secular views ===
Some secular Biblical scholars have instead proposed that forbidding incest with a daughter was originally in the list, but was then accidentally left out from the copy on which modern versions of the text ultimately depend, due to a mistake by the scribe.

== Rabbinic views ==
In the 4th century BCE, the Soferim (scribes) declared that there were relationships within which marriage is prohibited, in addition to those forbidden by the Bible. These additional relationships were termed seconds (Hebrew: sheniyyot), and included the wives of a man's:

- father's half-brother on their mother's side
- mother's half-brother on their father's side
- grandfather
- grandson.

The classical rabbis prohibited marriage between a man and any of his seconds, on the basis that doing so would act as a safeguard against infringing the Biblical prohibitions; one Talmudic opinion even arguing that the inclusion of the grandfather's wife and of the grandson's wife, among the seconds, is based on the Biblical rule against a wife's granddaughter. There was however some debate as to which relationships, other than the four listed above, counted as seconds; the Talmudic scholars and Rabbinic scholars of the middle age, the Rishonim, variously included or excluded the following relationships from the seconds of a man:

- grandmother's sister
- paternal grandfather's sister
- paternal grandfather's brother's wife
- grandfather's mother
- wife's great-grandmother
- wife's great-granddaughter (including great-granddaughter)
- an uncle's grandson's wife

The extent to which the forbidden relationships extend beyond the seconds is a matter of dispute, but all the Talmudic scholars agree that marriage to the wife of any male descendant, in the direct male line, was forbidden; some classical rabbis also included the wife of any male ancestor, in the direct male line, in this prohibition, as did all of the Jewish scholars of the Middle Ages. In the Jerusalem Talmud, some of the opinions even include all blood descendants and ancestors of the seconds in the prohibition.

In relation to seconds related only by marriage, some proposed the general principle that it would be acceptable to marry anyone only related to a "second" by a further marriage; for example, a wife of a father-in-law (apart from the mother-in-law), or the stepson's daughter-in-law. However, Israel Lipschitz interpreted this as forbidding even marriage to a wife's former husband's wife.

At least all Talmudic opinions agree that it was theoretically permitted to marry a stepfather's wife (excepting the mother), and to marry a stepsibling (a man marrying his stepsister, etc.). Nevertheless, some of the opinions expressed in the Jerusalem Talmud argue that to avoid observers jumping to the wrong conclusions, marriage between stepsiblings, or between a man and his wife's stepmother, should be forbidden, or at least carried out somewhere that observers would not already know that the participants are step-relations.

What is clear, is that no opinion in the Talmud forbids marriage to a cousin or a sister's daughter (a class of niece), and it even commends marriage to the latter – the closer relation of the two. Historically, there are a few examples of marriage between cousins; in 19th century England, the proportion of Jewish marriages occurring between cousins was 3.5 times higher than for the marriages of other religions; in the 19th century Lorraine the proportion was twice as high as that for Roman Catholics, and 12 times higher than that for Protestants.

=== In practice ===
Marriages forbidden in the Bible were regarded by the rabbis of the Middle Ages, the Rishonim as invalid – as if they had never occurred; any children born to such a couple were regarded as mamzerrim "bastards", and the relatives of the spouse were not regarded as forbidden relations for a further marriage. On the other hand, those relationships which were prohibited due to qualifying as seconds, and so forth, were regarded as wicked, but still valid; while they might have pressured such a couple to divorce, any children of the union were still seen as legitimate.

In general, the Jerusalem Talmud is more restrictive in regard to incest than the Babylonian Talmud; Ashkenazi Jews, following Joseph Karo, generally follow the incest regulations of the Jerusalem Talmud, while Sephardi Jews, exemplified by Maimonides, tend to follow the Babylonian Talmud. Thus Jacob ben Meir deliberately wrecked a wedding, stopping the marriage and spoiling the banquet and celebrations, because the man would have married his father-in-law's wife.

The classical rabbis regarded the incest regulations as being too important and too open to misinterpretation to be taught in public, instead requiring that, when it is taught, it must be taught to each student individually. They also argued that on occasions when the Bible was read in public, and the reading happened to involve some of the Biblical rules against incest, then the reading must be stopped, if the reader interprets the regulations in a different way to the Talmudic opinions.

== Karaite views ==
The Karaites, who reject the authority of Talmudic opinions, interpret the biblical prohibitions differently.

The early Karaites adopted the principle that marriage was a true and full union – each spouse was to be considered legally as the same person, and hence someone related to one spouse was seen as having exactly the same relation to the other. Applied to the Biblical regulations, this produced drastically simple rules, prohibiting marriage between almost all relations and spousal relations, except that a man could still marry his niece (or step-niece) and his grandmother (or grandfather's wife, or spouse's grandmother, or spouse's grandfather's wife). However, it also prohibited marriage to the relatives of every subsequent husband of a divorced wife.

In the 11th century, two Karaite reformists Joseph ben Abraham and Jeshua ben Judah rejected the principle that a marriage was a true and full union, instead arguing that the only relationships that should be forbidden were those analogous to those in the biblical prohibitions. Dividing the principle relatives into two groups:

- First-degree relatives – parent, stepparent, sibling, sibling-in-law, child, and child-in-law
- Second-degree relatives – aunt (including uncle's wife), uncle (including aunt's husband), grandchild, grandchild's wife

They organised the forbidden relationships into five or six categories:

- First-degree relatives, their direct ancestors, and their direct descendants
- Second-degree relatives, their direct ancestors, and their direct descendants
- First-degree relatives of the spouse (e.g. a man marrying two sisters, or a woman and her daughter), and their rivals (the wives of their husbands)
- Second-degree relatives of the spouse (e.g. a man marrying a woman and her granddaughter)
- The relative (by blood or marriage) of a relative's spouse, if such a marriage would create a parallel relation (e.g. a man marrying his brother's wife's sister, his grandfather's wife's granddaughter, or his uncle's niece); near-parallels are regarded as parallel relations (e.g. a man marrying his father's wife's sister, or his brother's wife's mother) for this purpose; stepsiblings are regarded as siblings for this purpose
- Second-degree relative's spouse's first-degree relatives (e.g. a sister-in-law's aunt); stepsiblings are regarded as first-degree relatives for this purpose. This last category is included by only one of the two reformists.

This reformed list of prohibited relations was subsequently adopted by almost all Karaites.

== See also ==
- Arayot
- Incest in the Bible
