= Joseph ben Abraham =

Joseph ben Abraham (Hebrew: יוסף בן אברהם הכהן, also known by the Arabic name Yusuf al-Basir) was a Karaite Jewish philosopher and theologian who flourished in Lower Mesopotamia or Persia in the first half of the eleventh century. He was the teacher of, among others, Jeshua ben Judah, also known as Abu al-Faraj. By way of euphemism, he was surnamed ha-Ro'eh "the seer" on account of his blindness.

His blindness did not prevent him from undertaking long journeys, likely as a missionary. During his travels, he frequented the religio-philosophical schools of the Mu'tazili, whose teachings he defended in his works. Of these the most important is the Muhtawi, translated from the Arabic into Hebrew, perhaps by Tobiah ben Moses, under the title Sefer ha-Ne'imot or Zikron ha-Datot. It is divided into forty chapters, in which all the main principles of Mu'tazili kalam are applied to Karaite dogmas, the five principles the monotheism: the necessity of admitting atoms and accidents; the existence of a Creator; the necessity of admitting certain attributes and rejecting others; God's justice and its relation to free will; reward and punishment; etc. He often argues against the Christians, Dualists, Zoroastrians, Epicureans, and various other sects, with whose tenets he shows himself well acquainted. He cites the founders of the Mu'tazili sects of al-Jabaiyah and al-Bahshamiyyah, Abu Ali Muhammad ibn Abd al-Wahhab al-Jabai, and his son Hashim Abd al-Salam, whose teachings he closely follows. The Muhtawi is still extant in manuscript, both in the original and in its Hebrew translation; the former in the David Kaufmann Library, the latter in the libraries of Leiden, Paris, and Saint Petersburg.

== His Al-Tamyiz ==
Another extant work of his is Al-Tamyiz, called also Al-Mansuri (Brit. Mus. Or. No. 2568). It was translated into Hebrew, with some additions, by Tobiah ben Moses under the title Mahkimat Peti (Oxford, Leiden, Paris, St. Petersburg). It is divided into thirty-three chapters and treats in abridged form all the non-polemical subjects contained in the Muhtawi. In the fourteenth chapter the author criticizes the Shi'ur Qomah, and refutes the theory of Benjamin ben Moses Nahawandi, who, holding God too sublime to concern Himself directly with the material world, believed that it was created by an angel acting as God's representative. From the similarity between some passages of the Mahkimat Peti and of the Emunot we-De'ot, it may be inferred that Joseph knew Saadia's work and often used it. The Mahkimat Peti (xxiii) is quoted, under its Arabic title Al-Mansuri, by Joseph ibn Tzaddik about God's sufficiency; ibn Tzaddik also criticizes the Mu'tazili theory adopted by Joseph ben Abraham (xxvii) concerning the reward reserved in the next world for animals and children in return for the sufferings inflicted upon them in this world ( 'Olam Katan, ed. Adolf Jellinek, pp. 46, 70).

Joseph quotes in the Muhtawi and Al-Tamyiz the following works of his, which are no longer in existence: Sihat al-Istidlal bi-al-Shahd (Shahr) 'ala al-Ghaib, probably on the proofs of the existence of a Creator; Ahwal al-Fa'il; Al-Muhit, in Hebrew, Shefot ha-Shofeṭim; a writing on, perhaps against, Abu Ghalib Thabit; Melitzat Iqre al-Lubad (?); Al-Isti'anah; Al-Istibsar, on the precepts (Sefer ha-Mitzvot), a fragment of which, comprising the laws of inheritance and purity, is still extant (Brit. Mus. Or. 2567). The laws concerning the festivals were translated into Hebrew by Tobiah ben Moses, under the title Sefer ha-Mo'adim. They are divided into eight chapters, in which Joseph discusses the arguments used by Samuel ben Ḥofni against the Karaites regarding the neomenia and the celebration of the Feast of the Bikkurim (first fruits). Abraham Harkavy supposes these arguments were also discussed in another work of Joseph's entitled Kitab al-Hidayah. Joseph is supposed to have been the author also of: Tzidduk ha-Din, on eschatology; She'elot u-Teshubot (Arabic, Mas'ail wa-Jawa'ib), containing thirteen philosophical questions addressed to Jewish and non-Jewish scholars; and Peri Tzaddiḳ, a chapter on theodicy.

== Influence on Karaism ==
Joseph was considered one of the greatest authorities among the Karaites. He reformed the Jewish views on incest, having protested against exaggerations of the scope of the hermeneutic rule of analogy by which the successors of the amora Anan had prohibited intermarriage between the most distant relatives. All his Karaite successors adopted his philosophical system down to Aaron ben Elijah, who, in his 'Etz Ḥayyim, cites him often. However, Joseph has no claim to originality in this field, for he only reproduced Mu'tazili kalam and his main work.

Joseph discussed only the general questions of monotheism, which are the common ground of both Jews and Muslims, and carefully avoided those on which Jews and Muslims are divided, as, for instance, the question whether the 613 Commandments has been abrogated. The value of his works lies only in the information they furnish concerning the Kalam of the Mu'tazili. It is probable that in representing the Karaite theologians (mutakallimin, in Moreh, lxxi), Maimonides alluded to Joseph.
