= Jeshua ben Judah =

11th century Karaite scholar, exegete and philosopher

Jeshua ben Judah (ישועה בן יהודה), also known as Abu al-Faraj Furqan ibn Asad (أبو الفرج فرقان بن أسد), was a Karaite Jewish scholar, exegete, and philosopher who lived in the eleventh-century in the Abbasid Caliphate, in Lower Mesopotamia or in Jerusalem.

He was a pupil of Joseph ben Abraham. Jeshua was considered one of the highest authorities among the Karaites, and he was called "the great teacher" (al-muʿallim).

Like all the Karaite leaders, he was very active propagandist; his public lectures on Karaism attracted many inquirers. Among these was a Rabbinite from Castile named Sidi ibn Ibrahim al-Taras, who, after having accepted the Karaite teachings, returned to his native country, where he organized a powerful propaganda by circulating Jeshua's writings. The greatest service, however, rendered by Jeshua to Karaism was his accomplishment of reforming the laws concerning Jewish views on incest, a reform his teacher had advocated.

== Biblical exegete ==
Jeshua's activity in the domain of Bible exegesis was very extensive. He translated the Hebrew Bible into Arabic and wrote an exhaustive commentary on it, of which he made in 1054 an abridged version. In this commentary, Jeshua used all the exegetical works of his Karaite predecessors and that of Saadia Gaon, often attacking the latter most vigorously. Several passages of Jeshua's commentary are quoted by Abraham ibn Ezra. Fragments of his translation and the exhaustive commentary on the part of Leviticus, with almost the whole of the abridged version, are extant in manuscript in the British Museum (MSS. Or. 2491; 2494, ii; 2544-46). Both commentaries were early translated into Hebrew, and parts of them are in the Firkovich collection at St. Petersburg.

Jeshua wrote two other Biblical works, an Arabic commentary on the Ten Commandments, which he reproduced in an abridged form, and a philosophical midrash entitled Bereshit Rabbah, in which he discusses, in the spirit of the Mutazilite kalam, creation, the existence and unity of God, the divine attributes, etc. A fragment of a Hebrew translation of the abridged commentary on the Ten Commandments made by Tobiah ben Moses under the title Pitron 'Aseret ha-Debarim is still extant in manuscript. The Bereshit Rabbah is no longer in existence. Passages from it are frequently quoted by Aaron ben Elijah in his Etz Hayyim, and by Abraham ibn Daud, who in his Sefer ha-Qabbalah calls it a blasphemous work.

== Rules of Relationship ==
Jeshua was also the author of a work on the precepts entitled Sefer ha-Yashar, which has not been preserved. From it was probably extracted his treatise on the degrees of relationship within which marriage is forbidden, quoted by him under the title Al-Jawabat wal-Masa'il fi al-'Arayot, and known in the Hebrew translation made by Jacob ben Simon under the title Sefer ha-'Arayot. Fragments of both the Arabic text and the Hebrew translation still exist in manuscript, the former in the British Museum (H. Or. No. 2497, iii.), and the latter in the libraries of Leyden and St. Petersburg (MS. No. 1614). In this treatise Jeshua discusses the hermeneutic rules which are to be used in the interpretation of these laws, gives a critical view of the principles upon which the various prohibitions are based, quotes Karaite authorities such as Anan ben David and Jacob Qirqisani on the subject, and produces the views of the Rabbinites Saadia and Simon Kahira, author of the Halakot Gedolot. Another treatise by Jeshua on the same subject was the Teshubat ha-ʿIqqar, published at Yevpatoria in 1834 under the title Iggeret ha-Teshubah.

Jeshua was also the author of the following philosophical treatises, probably translated from the Arabic: Marpe la-'Etzem, in twenty-five short chapters, containing proofs of the creation of the world, of the existence of God, and of His unity, omniscience, and providence (MS. Paris No. 670; MS. St. Petersburg No. 686); "Meshibot Nefesh," on revelation, prophecy, and the veracity of the Law; and three supplementary chapters to Joseph ben Abraham ha-Ro'eh's "Sefer Ne'imot", in which Jeshua treats of reward and punishment and of penitence. The Arabic original manuscript of the last of these three chapters is in the British Museum. It bears the title Mas'ala Mufarrida, and the author shows therein that the repetition of a prohibition must necessarily have a bearing on the punishment in case of transgression.

== Resources ==
- It contains the following bibliography:

- Pinsker, Liḳḳuṭe Ḳadmoniyyot, p. 71 and Index;
- Julius Fürst, Geschichte des Karäerthums. 1862, ii. 162 et seq.
- Avrom Ber Gotlober, Bikoret le-Toledot ha-Kara'im ביקורת לתולדות הקראים, Vilna, 1865, p. 195;
- G. Margoliouth, in J. Q. R. xi. 187 et seq.;
- Moritz Steinschneider Die Hebräischen Übersetzungen des Mittelalters und die Juden als Dolmetscher. Berlin, 1893, pp. 459, 942;
- Moritz Steinschneider Die Arabische Literatur der Juden. Frankfurt am Main, 1902, § 51;
- Schreiner, in Bericht der Lehranstalt, 1900;
- Adolf Neubauer. Aus der Petersburger Bibliothek: Beiträge und Documente zur Geschichte des Karäerthums und der karäischen Literatur. Oskar Leiner, 1866. pp. 19 et seq.
