= Joseph ibn Tzaddik =

Spanish rabbi, poet and philosopher

Rabbi Joseph ben Jacob ibn Tzaddik (Hebrew: יוסף אבן צדיק; died 1149) was a Spanish rabbi, poet, and philosopher. A Talmudist of high repute, he was appointed in 1138 dayyan at Cordova, which office he held conjointly with Maimon, father of Maimonides, until his death. Joseph was also a highly gifted poet, as is attested by Alharizi. Several of Joseph's religious poems are found in the Sephardic and African machzorim; and a poem addressed to Judah ha-Levi, on his visit to Cordova en route to Palestine, is included in the latter's diwan.

== Microcosmus ==
Joseph's reputation rests, however, not on his rabbinical knowledge or his poetical abilities, but on his activity in the field of religious philosophy. In a short treatise written in Arabic (the title being probably Al-'Alam al-Saghir) and, according to Moritz Steinschneider, translated by Nahum ha-Ma'arabi into Hebrew under the title Olam Katan, he expounds his views on the most important problems of theology. Though not an original thinker (at every point of his system he borrows very largely from Solomon Ibn Gabirol's Fons Vitæ), he shows himself to be thoroughly familiar with the philosophical and scientific literature of the Arabs, and imposes the stamp of his own individuality on the subjects treated. The Olam Katan comprises four main divisions, subdivided into sections. After stating the elementary and primary principles of the knowledge of God, the acquisition of which is the highest duty of man, and explaining how the human soul builds up its conception of things, Joseph treats, in the manner of the Arabic Aristotelians, of matter and form, of substance and accident, and of the composition of the various parts of the world. He concludes the first division with the central idea from which the book is evolved, namely, the comparison between the outer world (macrocosm) and man (microcosm), already hinted at by Plato ("Timæus," 47b), and greatly developed by the Arabian encyclopedists known as "the Brethren of Sincerity," by whom Joseph was greatly influenced.

Conceptions of the higher verities are to be attained by man through the study of himself, who sums up in his own being the outer world. Joseph therefore devotes the second division of his work to the study of physical and psychological man. There is nothing in the world, he holds, that does not find a parallel in man. In him are found the four elements and their characteristics; for he passes from heat to cold, from moisture to dryness. He participates in the nature of minerals, vegetables, and animals: he comes into being and passes out of being like the minerals; nourishes and reproduces himself like the plants; has feeling and life like the animals. Further, he presents analogies to the characteristics of things: his erect figure resembles that of the terebinth; his hair, grass and vegetation; his veins and arteries, rivers and canals; and his bones, the mountains. Indeed, he possesses the characteristics of the animals: he is brave like a lion, timid like a hare, patient like a lamb, and cunning like a fox.

From the physical, Joseph passes on to deal with the psychical man. Man, he says, is made up of three souls, vegetative, animal, and rational. Of these the rational soul is the highest in quality: it is of a spiritual substance; and its accidents are equally spiritual, as, for instance, conception, justice, benevolence, etc. Imbecility, injustice, malice, etc., are not accidents, but are negations of the accidents of conception, justice, and benevolence. Thus from the knowledge of his physical being man derives his conception of the material world; from that of his soul he acquires his conception of the spiritual world; and both of them lead to the cognizance of the Creator.

== Theological views ==
The third division deals with the doctrine of God, the divine attributes, and similar theological problems. Like Saadia Gaon and Bahya ibn Paquda, though more precisely and more systematically, Joseph proves the creation of the world (and consequently the existence of a Creator) from its finiteness. He criticizes the theory of the Motekallamin (as expounded in the Machkimat Peti of Joseph ha-Ro'eh), who assert that the world was produced by the created will of God. For him the will of God has existed from all eternity, and can not be separated from the essence of God. He claims that creation is timeless, and that before the production of the spheres time did not exist.

From the notion of the existence of God results the conception of the uniqueness of God; for the supposition of a plurality in His essence would nullify the notion of His existence. What the unit is to other numbers—forming and embracing them, yet still differing from them in essence—God is to the created beings. With the doctrine of the unity of God is connected the doctrine of the divine attributes. Here Joseph is in advance of his predecessors Saadia Gaon and Bahya ibn Paquda; and, like Maimonides, he concludes that no positive attributes, whether essential or unessential, can be posited of God, who is indefinable.

== Ethics ==
The fourth division deals with the duties of man, reward and punishment, and resurrection. Man must serve God with all his heart, and carry out all His precepts, though, owing to the weakness of his intellect, he may not grasp the reason for some of them. With Plato, Joseph says that man ought to know three things: (1) that there is a Creator who protects all and disposes of everything; (2) that nothing can be hidden from God; (3) that man can not win the favor of God by sacrifices, but must gain it by good deeds. Joseph asserts man's free will, without which there could be no reward or punishment (see Free Will); and he follows Saadia Gaon in the solution of the problem of God's prescience. The inequality in the distribution of worldly goods, the transitoriness of the world, the relativeness of the happiness procured by worldly goods, are for Joseph so many proofs that reward and punishment can take place only in the next world. He argues against the doctrine of bodily resurrection in the Messianic time. Though not himself a Motazilite, Joseph accepted a number of Motazilite theories and views (Schreiner, Der Kalam, p. 27).

The Olam Katan was little studied in the Middle Ages, and is very rarely quoted. Although paying a high tribute to Joseph's learning, Maimonides, in his letter addressed to Samuel ibn Tibbon (Pe'er ha-Dor, p. 28b), acknowledges that he has never seen the work, in which, he believes, are expounded the teachings of the Brethren of Sincerity. The Olam Katan is cited by David Kimchi, Jedaiah Bedersi, Meir ibn Aldabi, Isaac ibn Latif, and by the author of Ma'amar Haskel. It was edited for the first time by Adolf Jellinek at Leipsic in 1854. A critical edition was published by S. Horovitz in the Jahresbericht des Jüd.-Theol. Seminars, Breslau, 1903. Joseph was the author also of an Arabic work on logic, entitled Al-'Uyun wal-Mudhakarat, quoted in the Olam Katan.
