= Mourners of Zion (Karaite Movement) =

Karaite immigrants to Jerusalem

The Mourners of Zion (Hebrew: אֲבֵלֵי צִיּוֹן) were a group of Karaite Jews who resettled in Jerusalem beginning in the late ninth century, most departing from modern day Iraq and Iran. There, they established a congregation known as the "Community of Lilies" (ha-Shoshanim) in the "sela' ha-elef" quarter of the city, located either on the eastern slope of the Ophel or within the city walls of the City of David. The community was led by leaders called "nesi'im", who included David ben Bo'az and his descendants. The city became a center of Karaite writings in theology, biblical commentary, and other literature.

Relations with the ruling Islamic authorities were generally amicable; by the eleventh century, the community had gained official recognition and protection from the Fatimid Caliphate in Cairo. However, they were still prohibited from visiting the Temple Mount, with Jews approaching the site facing "great danger". The community came to an end in the late eleventh century, beginning with the Seljuk Turk conquest of the city in the 1070s, and continuing with the First Crusade in 1099. Many Jews were either taken captive or burned alive in a synagogue by the Crusaders. Most Jerusalemite Karaites subsequently moved to Byzantium and elsewhere, with some returning to Jerusalem to study in the next century.

== Origin and ideology ==
The establishment of the community was motivated by attempts to hasten the Redemption. The first Karaite to move to Jerusalem was Daniel al-Qumisi, in around 875 CE, departing from the Qumis district of Tabaristan, Iran. He and other Karaite sages known as the maskilim called for Jews to move to Jerusalem, even absent explicit divine Messianic intervention, and appealed to those who stayed behind to fund their resettlement. In the belief that it would help bring the Messiah, the community adopted ascetic practices such as not consuming meat and wine, living in isolation, and wearing sackcloth.

== Controversy with Rabbinic Jews ==
The Karaites were followed by the Rabbinic Palestinian Gaonate about a century later. Relations were tense, with the Rabbinic Jews routinely excommunicating the Karaites during the annual Hoshana Rabbah ceremony on the Mount of Olives. The Karaite movement also distinguished itself from the Rabbinic "galutiyim" ("men of the Exile") who preferred to remain in Babylonia. The groups differed in ideology. Among other things, Rabbinic ascetic practices focused on personal improvement, while Karaite asceticism tended to focus on achieving a Messianic end. Despite early hostility, cooperation increased in the eleventh century.
