= Isaac ibn Latif =

Jewish philosopher

Isaac ibn Latif (c. 1210–1280) was a Jewish philosopher, who lived most of his life in Toledo. In 1238 he published his first work, a treatise named sha'ar ha-shama'yim ("heaven's gate"), a commentary on Koheles (Ecclesiastes). Artscroll's Koheles cites from his work.

== Other works ==
Other works by ibn Latif include

- Iggeret ha-Teshuvah and
- Tsurat ha-Olam (published 1260; printed 1860 in Vienna).

The earliest printing of his Sefer Rov Po'a'lim ספר פעלים, was in 1885.

== Family ==
His father's name was Abraham (אברהם); he had a son named Moses (משה).
