= Abraham Harkavy =

Russian historian and orientalist (1835–1919)

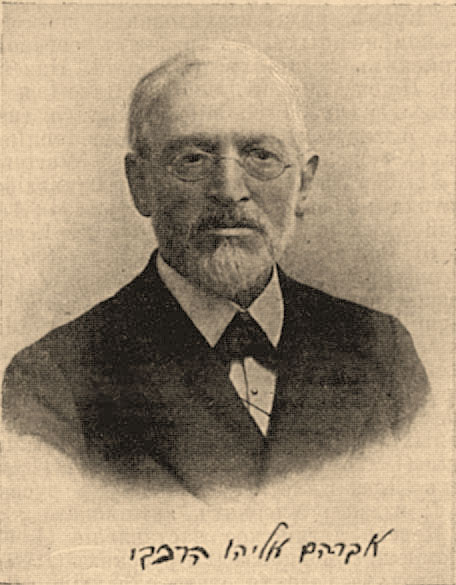
- Born: 17 October 1835; Novogrudok, Minsk Governorate, Russian Empire
- Died: 15 March 1919 (aged 83); Petrograd, Russia
- Occupation: Historian

Abraham (Albert) Harkavy (also known as Abraham Eliahu Harkavy or Abraham Eliyahu Harkavy; Hebrew: אברהם אליהו בן יעקב הרכבי, romanized: Avraham Eliyahu ben Yaakov Harkavy; Russian: Авраам Яковлевич Гаркави, romanized: Avraam Yakovlevich Garkavi; 17 October 1835 – 15 March 1919) was a Russian historian and orientalist.

== Biography ==
Harkavy was born in 1835 to a Lithuanian Jewish family in Novogrudok in Minsk Governorate of the Russian Empire (present-day Belarus). He studied initially in the Volozhin yeshiva and graduated from the Teacher's Institute in Vilna. In 1863, he enrolled at the University of St Petersburg, where he studied Oriental Languages and graduated with the degree of master of history in 1868. He continued his studies in Berlin and Paris, receiving a doctorate in history in 1872.

Harkavy become involved in Jewish communal life in Russia, and was extremely active in various capacities. From 1864 Harkavy was secretary of the Society for the Promotion of Culture Among the Jews of Russia, and from 1873, he was one of the directors of the Jewish community of St. Petersburg.

In 1876, he was appointed head of the Oriental Division in the Imperial Public Library, an astonishing achievement for a Jew under the tsarist society's antisemitic policies. He remained in this position for the rest of his life. He died in Petrograd.

== Works ==
Harkavy was a prolific author, both as an individual and in collaboration with other Russian-Jewish scholars. He wrote in Russian, German, and most notably in Hebrew, which had only recently been revived as a language of common discourse. Among his theories, he speculated that certain groups of Eastern European Jews, such as the Krymchaks, Karaims and even many Ashkenazim, might be descended from the Khazars. This theory, largely debunked by modern genetic testing, inspired Arthur Koestler's The Thirteenth Tribe, which took Harkavy's hypothesis to an extreme. In the course of his Khazar research, Harkavy refuted many of Avraham Firkovich's theories and exposed some of his forgeries.

Among his numerous works in Russian, Hebrew, German, and French, there should be mentioned his Ha-Yehudim u-Sefat ha-Slawim, studies in the early history of the Jews of Russia, first published in Russian by the Imperial Russian Archeological Society under the title Ob Yazykye Yevreyev, etc. (St. Petersburg, 1865). Harkavy's aim here was to prove that the first Jews who settled in South Russia did not come from Germany, as was supposed by Grätz and other historians, but from Greece through the Black Sea region and the Crimea, and from the Orient by way of the Caucasus. He furthermore showed that Slavonic was the language spoken by the Jews in the Slavonic countries until the arrival of German Jews in great numbers during the Crusades. He proved that the Jewish writers in Russia and other Slavonic countries used Slavonic words and phrases in their Biblical and Talmudic commentaries. The Slavonic names among the Slavonic Jews, the Slavonic inscriptions in Hebrew characters on Polish coins, the tradition among the Russian Jews that their ancestors spoke Slavonic, and the testimony of early writers, are effectively cited by him in support of his contention.

Harkavy contributed many valuable articles on the early history of the Jews in Russia to Meassef Niddaḥim (supplement to Ha-Meliẓ, parts i. and ii.), Ha-Karmel (1862 et seq.), Monatsschrift (1883 et seq.), Russko-Yevreiski Arkhiv (1883), Brüll's "Jahrbücher (1876), Voskhod (1881–84), Ben 'Ammi (part i., St. Petersburg, 1887), Ḥadashim gam Yeshanim (in Ha-Miẓpah, vol. i.), Ha-Asif (vol. i.), Keneset Yisrael (i. and iii.), Ha-Karmel (1865), and other publications.

In 1910, the scientific world celebrated Harkavy's 75th birthday by issuing a memorial book. The contributors were the world's best known scientists in Judaica and orientology. Attached to the book was a list of 399 works by Harkavy.

== Bibliography ==
Besides the above works he published:

- Skazaniya Yevreiskikh Pisatelei, o Chazarskom Tzarstvye St. Petersburg, 1874.
- Chazarskiya Pisma (in Yevreiskaya Biblioteka, 1881–82).
- Rus i Russkiye v Srednevyekovoi Yevreiskoi Literaturye (in Voskhod, 1881–82).
- Istoricheski Ocherk Sinoda Chetyriokh Stran (in Voskhod, 1884).
- Les Mots Egyptiens de la Bible (reprint from Journal Asiatique, Paris, 1870).
- Zikkaron la-Rishonim we-gam la-Aḥaronim. Studien und Mittheilungen aus der St. Petersburg Kaiserlichen Bibliothek 5 vols. St. Petersburg, 1879–82. Contains biographies and works of Samuel ha-Nagid, Samuel ben Hophni, Saadia Gaon, Hai Gaon, and other geonim, from manuscripts in the St. Petersburg library, annotated by Harkavy.
- Neuaufgefundene Hebräische Bibelhandschriften (paper read before the Imperial Academy of Sciences of St. Petersburg, April, 1884; published in Zapiski . . . Akademii, series vii., vol. 32, No. 8).
- O Yazykye Yevreyev Zhivshikh v Drevneye Vremya na Russi. St. Petersburg. 1886.
- Notes to the Russian translation of Heinrich Graetz's Geschichte. 2 vols., 1889–1902.
- Notes to the Russian translation of Gustav Karpeles's History of Jewish Literature. St. Petersburg, 1889–90.
- Notes and additions to P. Rabinovich's Hebrew translation of Grätz's Geschichte, vols. iii.-viii. Warsaw. 1893–99.

== Sources ==
- "Гаркави, Авраам Яковлевич" . Brockhaus and Efron Encyclopedic Dictionary (in Russian). 1906.
