= Jewish University =

Jewish University may refer to:

- American Jewish University, Los Angeles, formerly University of Judaism and Brandeis-Bardin Institute
- Karaite Jewish University

== See also ==
- List of Jewish universities and colleges in the United States
