= Symbra (Babylonia) =

Ancient town in Babylonia, now in Iraq

Symbra (Ancient Greek: Σύμβρα) was a small town in Babylonia mentioned by Zosimus as lying between two towns named Nisbara and Nischanaba, which are separated from each other by the Tigris River. William Smith identifies Symbra with Hucumbra, cited by Ammianus, which identification is accepted by the editors of the Barrington Atlas of the Greek and Roman World.

Its site is unlocated, although Ukbara has been suggested as a probable location.
