= Meir Rekhavi =

British Karaite hakham and author

Meir Yosef Rekhavi (born 1962) is a British born Karaite Hakham and author.

== Biography ==
He was born Martin Furman in Leeds, England. Rekhavi came from an Orthodox Jewish family which had migrated to northern England from Tukums, Latvia via Germany in the early 1900s. Rekhavi was raised as a Rabbinical Jew and received his formative religious education at an Ultra-Orthodox Ḥeder. He studied at various yeshivoth in Jerusalem before embracing Karaite Judaism. In 1981 Rekhavi began to question the authority of the Oral Torah. From 1984 Rekhavi was mentored by the Karaite Hakham Mordechai Alfandari in Jerusalem.

Rekhavi is the Chancellor of the Karaite Jewish University based in Switzerland and a founding member of the University, which was created in November 2005. In July 2007 Rekhavi served on the Beth Din (Jewish religious court) of the Karaite Jews of America that performed the first conversions of non-Jews to Karaite Judaism since 1465. He is also the Hakham of the Karaite Jews of Europe, sits on the Karaite Religious Council in Israel, and acts as an advisor to the Karaite Council of Sages. Rekhavi currently lives in Beer Sheva, Israel with his family and worships at the local Karaite synagogue.

== Books ==
Rekhavi is the co-author of As It Is Written: A Brief Case for Karaism (ISBN 0-9762637-1-8).

He also produced and self-published a Karaite translation from Biblical Hebrew to English of the scriptural text read at Passover, the Haggadah.

Me՚a Shaՙarim: An English Targum of the Tora according to the Plain Meaning Hardcover – October 1, 2015 (ISBN 979-8394093548)
