= Ukbara =

Medieval city on the Tigris River, Iraq

Coordinates: 33.783333°N 44.316667°E

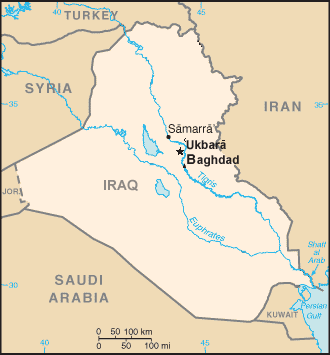

Ukbara (Arabic: عكبرا) was a medieval city in Iraq. It was located on the left bank of the Tigris between Samarra and Baghdad. The Tigris has changed course since, and its ruins now lie some distance from the river.

== History ==
It was refounded by the Sasanian shah Shapur I under the name of Vuzurg-Shapur (3rd century CE) and settled with Roman captives. According to adh-Dhahabi, the Buwayhid Sultan Jalal ad-Dawla fled there in 1031 to escape a slave revolt.

Famous native sons include:

- the great Islamic grammarian, philologist, and religious scholar Abul-Baqa Al-Ukbari (ca. 1143-1219), author of some 60 works, many of them recently reprinted;
- Ibn Makula, author of an early dictionary of names, born Sha'ban 5, 421 AH
- Sheikh al-Mufid
- two notable early Jewish/Karaite "heresiarchs", leaders of Karaite movements opposed to Anan ben David, Ishmael al-Ukbari and Meshwi al-Ukbari.

It is described in many Arabic geographical works, beginning with the famous 9th-century geography of Ibn Khordadhbeh, which mentions it four times, stating that:

- it was on the postal road from Samarra to Baghdad, nine stages from Samarra and six from Baghdad;
- it was on the road from Baghdad to Mosul, 9 parasangs from Baghdad (5 from the previous stop, al-Bardan, and 3 from the next, Bahimsha);
- it was on the westward road from Baghdad, 4 stages from al-Bardan (6 from Baghdad) and 7 from the next stop, Samarra.

(The seeming contradiction between points 1 and 3 is found in the text, as provided by http://www.alwaraq.com/ .)

However, the tenth-century al-Muqaddasi goes into a little more detail, saying that:

وفي وجه سامرا مدينة عكبرا وهي كبيرة عامرة، كثيرة الفواكه جيدة الاعناب سرية
And in front of Samarra is the town of Ukbara, which is large and populous, with abundant fruit and good grapes. (p. 42, al-Waraq online edition)

The twelfth-century geographer al-Idrisi is briefer, mentioning it twice.

The Jewish traveller Benjamin of Tudela (twelfth century) also mentions it, calling it "Okbara, the city which Jeconiah the King built, where there are about 10,000 Jews, and at their head are R. Chanan, R. Jabin and R. Ishmael."

The later Yaqut al-Hamawi (thirteenth century) goes into yet more detail, noting two alternate names, the "Arabized" form `Akburah and Buzurj-Sabur بزرج سابور, after the Persian name Vuzurg-Shapur mentioned above, calling it:

بليدة من نواحي دُجيل قرب صريفين وأوَانا بينها وبين بغداد عشرة فراسخ، والنسبة إليها عكبري وعكبراوي، منها شيخنا إمام عصره محب الدين أبو البقاء عبد اللهَ بن الحسين النحوي العكبري مات في ربيع الأول سنة 616، وقرىء على سارية بجامع عكبرا:

a little town in the area of Dujayl near Sarifin and Awana, 10 parasangs from Baghdad; its natives are called Ukbari or Ukbarawi, and include our Sheikh the Imam of his time, Muhibb ud-Din Abul-Baqa Abdallah ibn al-Husayn an-Nahwi al-Ukbari, who died in Rabi I, 616 AH.

and quotes two brief epigrams about the town.

The biographical dictionary of Ibn Khallikan (thirteenth century) calls it:

وهي بليدة على دجلة فوق بغداد بعشرة فراسخ خرج منها جماعة من العلماء وغيرهم
a little town on the Tigris, 10 parasangs above Baghdad, from which a group of learned men and their like have emerged.

== See also ==
- Uqbar

== Sources ==
- adh-Dhahabi, al-Ibar fi Khabar min al-Ghabar, al-Waraq edition, p. 193.
- al-Muqaddasi, Ahsan ut-Taqasim fi Ma`rifati l-'Aqalim, Al-Waraq edition, p. 42.
- Benjamin of Tudela, The Itinerary of Benjamin of Tudela, translated by Macus Nathan Adler, London 1907, p. 35.
- Ibn Khallikan, Wafayat ul-'A`yan, Al-Waraq edition, p. 351.
- Ibn Khordadhbeh, al-Masalik wal-Mamalik, Al-Waraq edition, pp. 14, 21, 56, 61.
- Kohler, Kaufmann and Samuel Poznanski, Jewish Encyclopedia article on Ishmael of Akbara
- W. Schott, "Ocbara" and "Ocbari", in ed. Johann Samuel Ersch, Johann Gottfried Gruber, Allgemeine Encyclopädie der Wissenschaften und Künste, Leipzig 1818.
- Singer, Isidore and Broydé, Isaac, Jewish Encyclopedia article on "Meshwi al-‘Ukbari"
- — the Jewish Encyclopedia article "Okbara and Okbarites" is simply a cross reference to their article "Meshwi al-‘Ukbari".
- Yaqut al-Hamawi, Mu'jam al-Buldan, Al-Waraq edition, p. 1243
- ed. Ehsan Yarshater, The Cambridge History of Iran, vol. 3(2): The Seleucid, Parthian, and Sasanian Periods, NY: Cambridge UP, 1983, pp. 757–760.
