= Ibn Shihab al-Ukbari =

Iraqi Islamic scholar and poet

- Born: August 946; Ukbara, Iraq
- Died: May 3, 1037; Ukbara, Iraq
- Occupations: Poet, Scribe, Hanbali Jurist
- Era: 10th century CE / 4th century AH
- Known for: Poetry, Islami jurisprudence, Arabic grammar
- Notable work: Poetry, works on jurisprudence and grammar

Abu Ali Hasan ibn Shihab ibn Hasan al-Ukbari (Arabic: ابو علي حسن بن شهاب بن حسن العكبري) (August 946 – May 3, 1037) was a prominent Iraqi poet, scribe, and Hanbali jurist who lived during the 10th century. Born and raised in the town of Ukbara, where he also died, al-Ukbari left behind a body of poetry as well as scholarly works on Islamic jurisprudence and Arabic grammar.

== Biography ==
Abu Ali Hasan ibn Shihab ibn al-Hasan ibn Ali ibn Shihab al-Ukbari was born in Ukbara in the month of Muharram 335 AH / August 946. He studied Hadith under notable scholars such as Abu Ali ibn al-Sawaf, Ahmad ibn Yusuf ibn Khlad, Abu Ali al-Tumari, Habib ibn al-Hasan al-Qazzaz, and Ibn Malik al-Qutii, among others. His teachings and knowledge were also sought by scholars like Abu Bakr al-Khatib and Isa ibn Ahmad al-Hamdhani.

Al-Ukbari was renowned for his beautiful handwriting, which became a point of admiration. He was well-versed in Islamic jurisprudence, particularly within the Hanbali school of thought, and was celebrated for his contributions to Arabic grammar and poetry. He was regarded as a prominent figure in his era, excelling in both religious and literary fields.

The historian al-Khatib al-Baghdadi mentioned al-Ukbari in his Tarikh (History), describing him as a pious and scholarly individual. He stated, “He was a virtuous scholar, a student of the teachings of Ahmad ibn Hanbal, a Quranic reciter, well-versed in literature, and a poet. I wrote about him in Ukbara. I heard Abu Bakr al-Barqani mention him, and he said: ‘A trustworthy and reliable man.’”

Al-Ukbari died on the night of May 3, 1037, in his hometown of Ukbara.

== Works ==
- Risalah fi Usul al-Fiqh (A Treatise on the Fundamentals of Jurisprudence)
- Jamaʿ Diwan al-Ahnaf al-Ukbari (The Collected Diwan of Ahnaf al-Ukbari).
