= Okbarites =

Jewish sect founded by Meshwi al-Ukbari

The Okbarites (Arabic: Al-‘Ukbariyyah), also known as the Mishwaites, (Note: Also Ukbarites, Meshawites.) were a Jewish sect founded by the 9th-century heresiarch Meshwi al-Ukbari (Hebrew: מישויה אלעכברי). (Note: Also transliterated into English as Meswi, Mishawayh, Mâseweihi, and other variants.) The sect derived its name from the city of Ukbara, near Baghdad, said to have been Meshwi's place of residence.

== History ==
According to Jacob Qirqisani, Meshwi al-Ukbari lived after Ishmael al-Ukbari; his original name was Moses, but it was converted by his adversaries into "Meshwi" ('one whose ideas are confused'). Judah Hadassi, on the authority of David ibn Merwan al-Muḳammaṣ, gives the name of the founder of the sect as Moses of Baalbek, who is probably identical with Meshwi al-Ukbari.

From a passage in the Oẓar Neḥmad of the Karaite Tobias ben Moses, Delitzsch concluded that Meshwi embraced Christianity in the later part of his life. Isaac Broydé disputed this, arguing that the sect likely would not have survived the apostasy of its founder, yet Meshwi still had followers at the time of Qirqisani. There is evidence that a Mishwaite community existed in Byzantium as late as the mid-12th century.

== Beliefs ==
While no written texts attributed to Meshwi have been discovered, the writings of the group's detractors provide insight into his opinions and teachings.

Meshwi differed in many points from both the Karaite and Rabbinic Judaism, especially in the area of calendation. He apparently fixed a solar thirty-day solar month, and ruled that days were to be counted from morning to morning as opposed to sunset to sunset. Presumably because Yom Kippur is termed "Sabbath of Sabbaths" in the Tanakh, he affirmed that that holiday must always occur on a Shabbat, which would make the Passover fall on Thursday.

He also ordered his followers to turn to the West in praying, instead of in the direction of the Temple. According to Meshwi, it was not allowable to offer sacrifices in the Temple on Shabbat. Contrary to normative halakha, Meshwi is said to have allowed his followers to eat traditionally prohibited animal fats.
