= Tinok shenishba =

Jew raised outside Judaism

Tinok shenishba (Hebrew: תִּינוֹק שֶׁנִשְׁבָּה, romanized: tinoq šenišbā, lit. 'captured infant') is a term that refers to Jews who sin as a result of having been raised without sufficient knowledge and understanding of Judaism. The term originates from a theoretical discussion in the Talmud regarding a Jew who was kidnapped by gentiles as an infant and therefore sinned inadvertently for lack of halakhic knowledge and exposure to Judaism. In contemporary Orthodox Judaism, the term is often used to describe unaffiliated or non-observant Jews, as well as those raised in and who continue to practice modern forms of non-Orthodox Judaism, including Conservative, Reform, Reconstructionist, and non-denominational Judaism.

== Terminology ==
Tinok shenishba is an abbreviation form of tinok shenishba bein hanochrim, which translates to "An infant captured [and consequently raised] among gentiles," according to Reform rabbi Solomon Freehof in a 1960 responsum for the Central Conference of American Rabbis. This is a case where the individual in question is not responsible for their actions or sins preceding their return to Judaism due to their having been raised in a place or situation wherein Halakha—and, by extension, normative Judaism—is not followed, if not wholly unknown. An individual does not have to have been "captured" as an infant to fall within the definition of a tinok shenishba but rather, even if the child were raised without religious guidance, it would be considered tinok shenishba.

== Application in Jewish law ==
Because a tinok shenishba was not raised with proper guidance towards appreciation of Jewish life, law, and ritual, they are not accountable for not following the Torah. If this Jew would encounter and re-find his Jewish brothers and their Torah, he must be welcomed back and taught the correct way to live life as a Jew.

== Codification in the Talmud ==
The concept of tinok shenishba is first mentioned in the Talmud. In Shevu'ot 5a, the Gemara states that responsibility for inadvertent transgression is only placed upon an individual who knew the correct law at two points in time (before the transgression and the remembrance after the transgression) and forgot the law sometime in between. If that individual knew the law, subsequently forgot it, and never again remembered or received a reminder, they would be an unwitting transgressor. Similarly, if an individual never knew the law in the first place, and subsequently learned the law, they would also be an unwitting transgressor. This latter example would fall under the category of a tinok shenishba.

In Shabbat 68b, there is a dispute between Abba Arikha and Samuel of Nehardea on one side, and Yochanan bar Nafcha and Shimon ben Lakish on the other, regarding in what type of situations a tinok shenishba (or a convert who was similarly raised among gentiles) is responsible for punishment and/or repentance along with the offering of animal sacrifices in the Holy Temple upon transgression of the laws of Shabbat and their subsequent return to Judaism. The halacha follows that a tinok shenishba would only be required to do one act of repentance for their multiple violations of the law, because all the violations stemmed from a single instance of not knowing the proper laws to obey:

כלל גדול אמרו בשבת: כל השוכח עיקר שבת ועשה מלאכות הרבה בשבתות הרבה אינו חייב אלא חטאת אחת. כיצד? תינוק שנשבה לבין הגויים, וגר שנתגייר בין הגויים ועשה מלאכות הרבה בשבתות הרבה – אינו חייב אלא חטאת אחת.

They stated a significant principle with regard to the halakhot of Shabbat: One who forgets the essence of Shabbat, i.e., one who does not know that there is a mitzva of Shabbat in the Torah, and performs many prohibited labors on multiple Shabbatot is liable to bring only one sin-offering. How so? With regard to a child who was taken captive among the gentiles and a convert who converted among the gentiles and does not know the essence of Shabbat; and if he performed many prohibited labors on multiple Shabbatot, he is only liable to bring one sin-offering for all his unwitting transgressions.

Shabbat 68b

== Practical relevance in the modern era ==
Maimonides speaks out strongly against those who deny the validity of the Oral Torah, including the Mishnah and the Talmud, labeling them as heretics. However, he expresses concern for the offspring of such individuals, and excludes them from those who deserve such punishment because they participated unwittingly in their denial of the Oral Law. While they are indeed sinners, he declares them unintentional participants in their lack of adherence to Jewish law and belief, similar to the case of a tinok shenishba. Rather than be pushed away, such individuals are to be drawn into the Jewish community and taught the proper way so they can become observant Jews.

The notion that unaffiliated and unobservant Jews are unwitting sinners who should be taught the Jewish laws and customs and welcomed into the Torah community is the basis for the many Orthodox Judaism outreach organisations (Kiruv) that exist in the modern era, including Chabad, Aish Hatorah, Ohr Somayach and Gateways.

== Hasidic mysticism ==
The Baal Shem Tov (1698–1760), founder of the revivalist Hasidic movement, brought a mystical soul-dimension to the traditional Talmudic notions of the tinok shenishba, and the am ha'aretz (uneducated-boorish-rustic Jews). While the former terms derive from the pre-eminent status of Torah study in Rabbinic Jewish culture, their downside was that in the 17–18th century Eastern Europe in which Hasidism emerged, their elitist notions contributed to the physical and spiritual hardship and disenfranchisement of the common Jewish folk from deeper Jewish affiliation.

Adjusting the former hierarchy of values, the Baal Shem Tov taught that the simple, sincere common Jewish folk could be closer to God than the scholars, for whom pride may affect their scholarly achievements, and the elite scholars could envy and learn lessons in devotion from the uneducated community. The Baal Shem Tov and later Hasidic masters made deveikut the central principle in Jewish spirituality, teaching that the sincere divine soul essence of the artless Jew reflects the essential divine simplicity. In contemporary Hasidic views of outreach to unobservant Jews, this mystical emphasis implies that the value of a small deed of observance by unaffiliated Jews would be able to set aside one's own spiritual development, as the Baal Shem Tov taught, "a soul may come into the World for 70 years in order to do a single deed of kindness to another person".

== See also ==
- Baal teshuva
- Jewish assimilation
- Jewish fundamentalism
- Jewish orphans controversy
- Jewish schisms
- List of Jewish atheists and agnostics
- Off the derech
- Orphans' Decree
- Zera Yisrael
