= Karaite Jewish University =

- Other names: KJU
- Type: Non-profit
- Established: 2005
- Religious affiliation: Karaite Judaism
- Location: California, U.S.A., United States

The Karaite Jewish University is a non-profit corporation incorporated in California, U.S.A., in November 2005 for the purposes of disseminating the study of Karaite Judaism.

== History ==
The university's first “Introduction to Judaism” class began in February 2006 and ended in May 2007. Fourteen of the graduates from the course converted to Judaism together with their children under the auspices of Congregation Bnai Israel of the Karaite Jews of America in Daly City, California, on July 30, 2007. The conversions were carried out under the auspices of the Ḳaraite Jews of America and with the approval of the Council of Sages. These were the first official sanctioned conversions to Judaism according to the Karaite rite since 1465.

On September 2, 2007, the university awarded an Honorary Doctorate degree in Education to Mourad El-Kodsi, historian and author of The Karaite Jews of Egypt and The Karaites of Poland, Lithuania, Russia & Ukraine. El-Kodsi was named Dean Emeritus of the university whose function will be to mentor the university's graduate students.

The current Chancellor of the university is Hakham Meir Rekhavi.

== Accreditation ==
Karaite Jewish University is not accredited as an academic institution. However, it has been authorized by the Council of Sages of Universal Karaite Judaism to teach an Introduction to Karaite Judaism course, both for Rabbinic Jews wishing to affiliate formally with Karaite Judaism, as well as potential converts to Judaism according to Karaite practice. Universal Karaite Judaism is the official body recognized by the State of Israel as representing Karaite Jews in matters of personal status.

== See also ==
- List of Jewish universities and colleges in the United States
